= List of Palestinian artists =

The following list of notable Palestinian artists (in alphabetical order by last name) includes artists of various genres, who are notable and are either born in Palestine, of Palestinian descent or who produce works that are primarily about Palestine.

== A ==
- Jussuf Abbo (1890–1953), printmaker, sculptor
- Jumana Emil Abboud (born 1971), contemporary artist
- Ruanne Abou-Rahme (born 1983), of the art duo Basel Abbas and Ruanne Abou-Rahme
- Karimeh Abbud (1893–1955), photographer
- Hannan Abu-Hussein (born 1972), installation artist and video artist
- Maliheh Afnan (1935–2016), painter
- Laila Ajjawi (active since 2015), graffiti artist
- Tamam Al-Akhal (born 1935), painter
- Zulfa al-Sa'di (1905–1988), painter
- Iman Al Sayed (born 1984), contemporary artist
- Sama Raena Alshaibi (born 1973), conceptual artist
- Shadi Alzaqzouq (born 1981), Libyan-born Palestinian painter; lives in France
- Nabil Anani (born 1943), painter, ceramicist and sculptor
- Dana Awartani (born 1987), Saudi-born Palestinian painter, video artist, and sand mosaicist

== B ==
- Issam Bader (1948–2003), painter, ceramicist, and art educator; co-founder of the Association of Palestinian Artists
- Nidaa Badwan (born 1987), Emirati-born Palestinian visual artist, living in Italy
- Tayseer Barakat (born 1959), painter, installation artist, curator
- Taysir Batniji (born 1966) Palestinian multidisciplinary artist, photographer, living in Paris
- Nahil Bishara (1919–1997), Palestinian Impressionist artist
- Kamal Boullata (1942 - 2019), painter, writer, art historian
- Mohammed Bushnaq (1934–2017), painter and sculptor, Palestinian-born of Bosniak heritage

== C ==
- Rajie Cook (1930–2021), American graphic designer, sculptor, peace activist and photographer; of Palestinian ancestry

== D ==
- Mohamed Dalo (born 1994), painter with Duchenne muscular dystrophy
- Shirien Damra, American-born Palestinian illustrator, designer

== E ==
- Nasr Abdel Aziz Eleyan (born 1941), painter, professor, television production designer, and television producer
- Ashraf Fayadh (born 1980), Saudi-born Palestinian visual artist and poet; sentenced to apostasy by the Saudi courts

== F ==
- Hanna Farah-Kufer Bir'im (born 1960), installation artist and architect

== G ==
- Fathi Ghaben (1947–2024), painter
- Asma Ghanem (born 1991) Syrian-born Palestinian photographer, visual artist, experimental musician
- Ibrahim Ghannam (1930–1984), Palestinian painter, who lived in Lebanon

== H ==
- Samia Halaby (born 1936), Palestinian-born American painter, digital artist, activist, and educator
- Sophie Halaby (1906–1997), watercolorist
- John Halaka (born 1957), Egyptian-born American visual artist, documentary filmmaker, and professor; of Lebanese and Palestinian ethnicity
- Rula Halawani (born 1964), photographic artist
- Mustafa al-Hallaj (1938–2002), graphic designer, painter, printmaker, sculptor
- Alexandra Handal (born 1975), Haitian-born contemporary artist and filmmaker
- Hazem Harb (born 1980), Palestinian-born collagist, photographer, and installation artist, based in Rome and Dubai
- Mona Hatoum (born 1952), Lebanese-born video and installation artist
- Ibrahim Hazimeh (born 1933), Palestinian-born German painter, designer, sculptor
- Jumana El Husseini (1932–2018), painter, sculptor, based in Paris

== J ==
- Emily Jacir (born 1972), contemporary artist, filmmaker
- Khaled Jarrar (born 1976), photographer, video artist, sculptor, installation artist, and performance artist

== K ==
- Sahar Khoury (born 1973), American mixed media sculptor, of Iranian and Jordanian–Palestinian descent

== M ==
- Jumana Manna (born 1987), American-born Palestinian installation artist and filmmaker
- Sliman Mansour (born 1947), painter, sculptor, author, and cartoonist
- Malak Mattar, painter, illustrator, and author of children's books; from Gaza
- Abdul Hay Mosallam Zarara (1933–2020), Palestinian-born Jordanian self-taught painter

== N ==
- Jordan Nassar (born 1985), American contemporary textile artist, of Palestinian and Polish descent

== Q ==
- Zohdy Qadry (born 1972), painter

== R ==
- Khalil Rabah (born 1961) multidisciplinary, installation artist

== S ==
- Raeda Saadeh (born 1977), visual artist
- Steve Sabella (born 1975), born in Jerusalem, photographer
- Rana Samara (born 1985), painter
- Larissa Sansour (born 1973), Palestinian-born English photographer, filmmaker, sculptor, and installation artist
- Vivien Sansour (born 1978) installation artist, and founder of the Palestine Heirloom Seed Library
- Shareef Sarhan (born 1976) visual artist, photographer, designer; founder of Shababeek for Contemporary Art (Windows From Gaza)
- Juliana Seraphim (born 1934), Palestinian-born Lebanese painter
- Ismail Shammout (1930–2006), Palestinian-born Jordanian painter and art historian
- Laila Shawa (born 1940), visual artist
- Ahlam Shibli (born 1970), photographer
- Nida Sinnokrot (born 1971) American installation artist, filmmaker, of Palestinian descent

== T ==
- Vera Tamari (born 1945), painter, ceramicist, sculptor, museum founder, educator, art historian

== W ==
- Sharif Waked (born 1964), painter

== Z ==
- Heba Zagout (1984–2023)
- Hisham Zreiq (born 1968), film director
- Hani Zurob (born 1976), Palestinian–born French painter, based in Paris

== See also ==
- Hurufiyya movement, art movement of calligraphy-based visual artists
- List of Palestinian Americans
- List of Palestinian painters
- List of Palestinian women artists
- Palestinian art
