= List of Palestinian women artists =

This is a list of women artists who were born in Palestine or whose artworks are closely associated with that country.

== A ==
- Jumana Emil Abboud (born 1971), contemporary artist working in video art, installation art, performance art, and sculpture
- Karimeh Abbud (1893–1955), photographer
- Ruanne Abou-Rahme (born 1983), of the art duo Basel Abbas and Ruanne Abou-Rahme
- Maliheh Afnan (1935–2016), painter, sculptor
- Laila Ajjawi (active since 2015), graffiti artist
- Tamam Al-Akhal (born 1935), painter
- Zulfa al-Sa'di (1910–1988), painter
- Iman Al Sayed (born 1984), contemporary artist
- Sama Raena Alshaibi (born 1973), conceptual artist

== H ==
- Samia Halaby (born 1936), painter, artist, activist, educator, and scholar; lives in the United States
- Rula Halawani (born 1964), photographic artist
- Alexandra Handal (born 1975), Haitian-born contemporary artist and filmmaker
- Mona Hatoum (born 1952), Lebanese-born video and installation artist
- Jumana El Husseini (1932–2018), painter, sculptor, based in Paris

== J ==
- Emily Jacir (born 1972), contemporary artist, filmmaker

== M ==
- Malak Mattar, painter, illustrator, and author of children's books; from Gaza

== S ==
- Raeda Saadeh (born 1977), photography, installation art, and performance art
- Larissa Sansour (born 1973), photography, film, sculpture, and installation art
- Vivien Sansour (born 1978) visual artist, founder of the Palestine Heirloom Seed Library
- Juliana Seraphim (born 1934), Palestinian-born Lebanese painter
- Laila Shawa (born 1940), painter, sculptor, printmaker
- Ahlam Shibli (born 1970), photographer

== T ==
- Vera Tamari (born 1945), painter, ceramicist, sculptor, museum founder, educator, art historian

== Z ==
- Heba Zagout (1984–2023)

== See also ==
- Palestinian art
- List of Palestinian artists
- List of Palestinian painters
