= List of Palestinian painters =

The following is a list of Palestinian painters.

== A ==
- Shadi Alzaqzouq (born 1981), Libyan-born Palestinian painter; lives in France

== B ==
- Tayseer Barakat (born 1959), painter, installation artist, curator

== D ==
- Mohamed Dalo (born 1994), painter with Duchenne muscular dystrophy

== E ==
- Nasr Abdel Aziz Eleyan (born 1941), painter, professor, television production designer, and television producer; lives in Jordan

== G ==
- Fathi Ghaben (1947–2024), painter
- Ibrahim Ghannam (1930–1984), painter; lives in Lebanon

== H ==
- Samia Halaby (born 1936), painter, activist, educator, and scholar; lives in the United States
- Hazem Harb (born 1980), Palestinian-born painter, collagist, photographer, and installation artist; who has lived in Rome and Dubai
- Ibrahim Hazimeh (born 1933), painter, designer, and educator; refugee that lived in Lebanon and Syria, before moving to Germany
- Jumana El Husseini (1932–2018), painter and sculptor; who lived in Paris

== M ==
- Sliman Mansour (born 1947), painter, sculptor, author and cartoonist
- Malak Mattar, painter, illustrator, and author of children's books; from Gaza
- Abdul Hay Mosallam Zarara (1933–2020), self-taught painter who archived the recent histories of the Palestinian people

== Q ==
- Zohdy Qadry (born 1972), painter

== S ==
- Samir Salameh (1944–2018), Palestinian-born French painter
- Juliana Seraphim (born 1934), Palestinian-born Lebanese painter
- Ismail Shammout (1930–2006), Palestinian-born Jordanian painter and art historian
- Laila Shawa (1940–2022), painter, sculptor, printmaker

== T ==
- Vera Tamari (born 1945), painter, ceramicist, sculptor, museum founder, educator, art historian

== W ==
- Sharif Waked (born 1964), painter and mixed media artist

== Z ==
- Hani Zurob (born 1976), Palestinian painter based in Paris

== See also ==
- List of Palestinian artists
- List of Palestinian women artists
