= The Big Picture Art Platform =

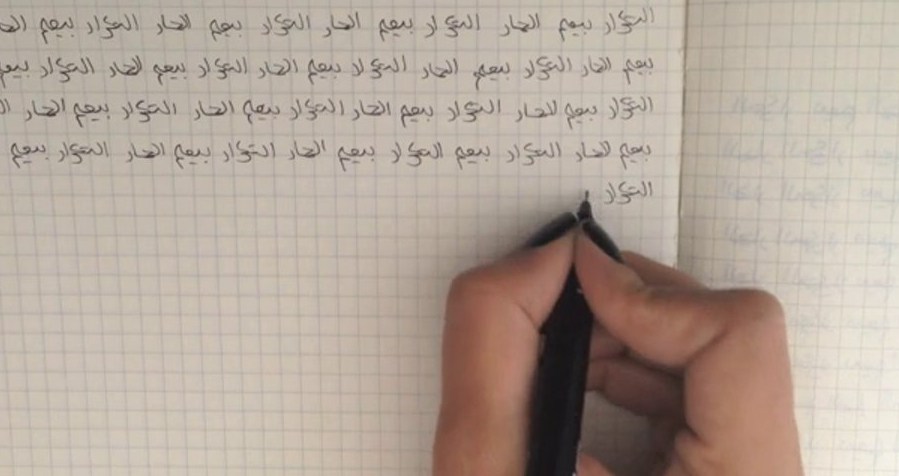
Re-Repeat By Iman Al Sayed - The Big Picture Art Exhibition 2014

A non-profit art organization consists of an annual art exhibition as well as an expanded program of talks and collateral events in The United Arab Emirates. Participating artists and curators for the juried exhibition are selected via an open call announced every December.

== Annual exhibition ==
- 2015: Hosted in Pro Art Gallery and Street Art Gallery Dubai in the month of May and curated by Xenia Gazi.
- 2014: Hosted in Pro Art Gallery Dubai and which included original works artists such as Picasso, Andy Warhol, Salvador Dalí, Roy Lichtenstein, Jean-Michel Basquiat and Banksy curated along 40 emerging artists from the UAE curated by Ram Nath.
- 2013: Hosted in June 2013 at Dubai Community Theatre and Arts Centre.

== Collateral exhibitions ==
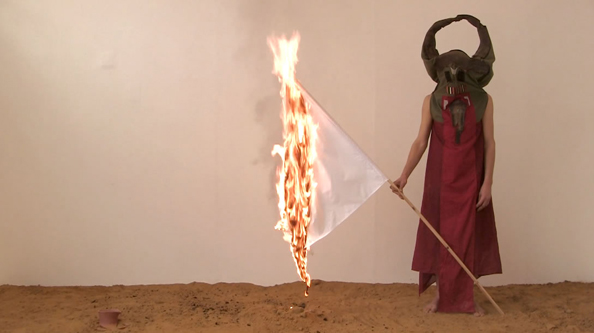
- Sulaiman Majali - Hunger Exhibition 2013
  Hunger: An art exhibition themed behind Halloween, co-curated by Simon Coates and Ram Nath and held at The Gallery of Light in Oct 2013.
- 22 Ways to Kill Your Boss: Organized with the collaboration of The Henosis Events, the exhibition opened in June 2014 and showcased 22 original artworks by artists from 12 countries living in UAE, each demonstrating a way to kill their bosses at work.
- Pitch Black: A conceptual sound art experiment with Sanhata to create a holistic atmosphere emerged from complete darkness and noise to practice sound-based meditation.
- A Funny Kind of Exhibition: curated by Mel Pickup and featured works by five artists who draw their inspiration from cartoons and comic books at Cartoon Art Gallery in Nov 2013, Dubai.
- Mind Your Hashtags: Curated in collaboration with The Henosis Events, The exhibition was held at The Space, Abu Dhabi in Oct 2014.
- Tse Tse Fly: The first experimental noise club night in the Middle East co-curated by Ram Nath and Simon Coates.

== See also ==
Official Website
