= Zekharia =

Zekharia: זכריה (Hebrew)
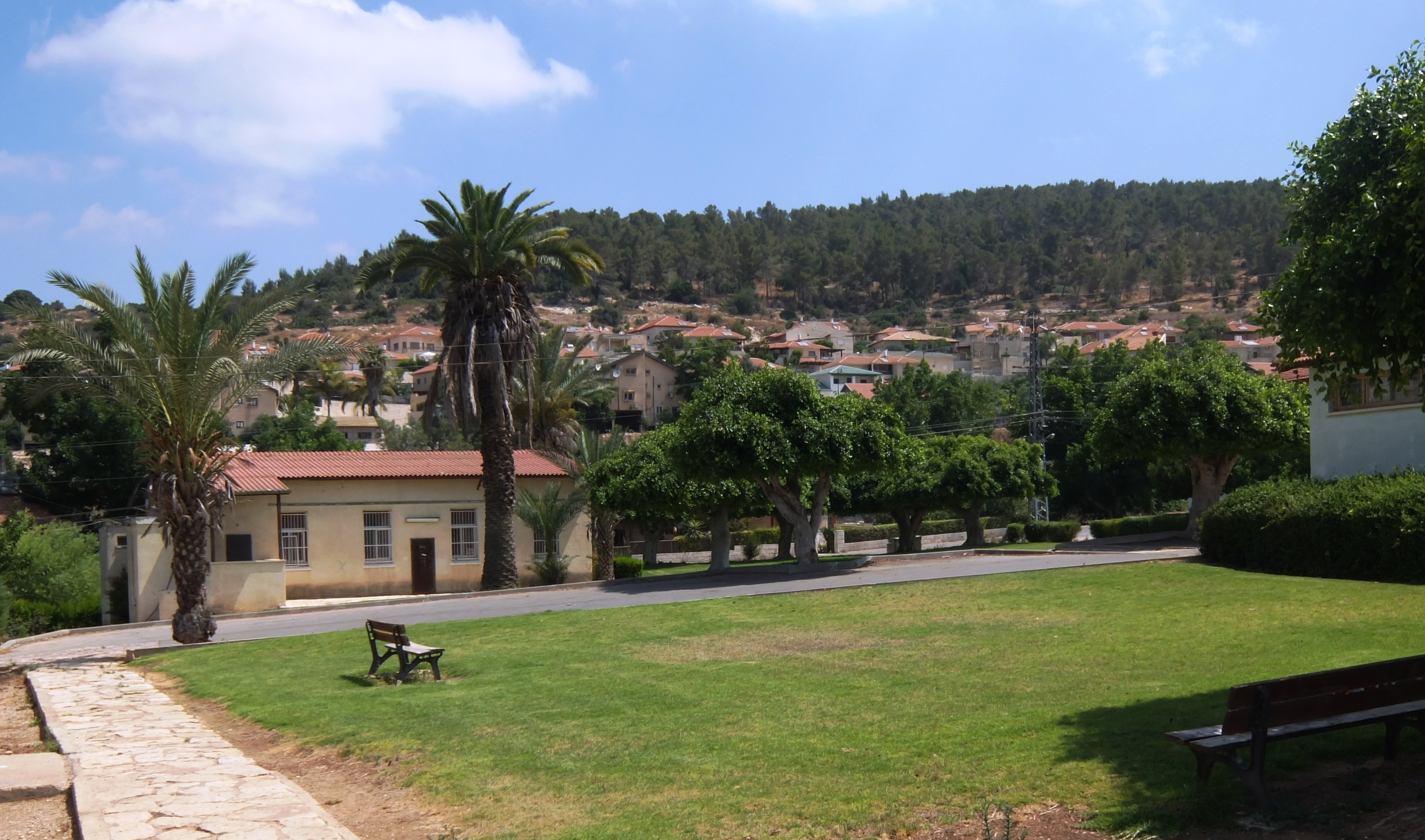

- Location within Jerusalem District
- Coordinates: 31°42′35″N 34°56′42″E
- Country: Israel
- District: Jerusalem
- Council: Mateh Yehuda
- Affiliation: Moshavim Movement
- Population (2024): 1,392

Zekharia (Hebrew: זְכַרְיָה, lit. 'Zechariah') is a moshav in central Israel. It sits on the site of the previous Palestinian village of Zakariyya (Arabic: زكريا), whose inhabitants were expelled in 1949 in the wake of the 1948 Arab-Israeli War. Located near Beit Shemesh, it falls under the jurisdiction of Mateh Yehuda Regional Council. In 2024 it had a population of 1,392.

Settlement in the area dates back to the Iron Age. During the Roman era a town named Beit Zacharia was located on the hill, which according to legend was the burial place of the prophet Zechariah. By the Mamluk era, it had become a Muslim village, and was known by various names, including Zakariyya al-Battih, Kefr Zakaria, Az-Zakariyya or simply Zakariyya. Although the village had been allotted to the Arab state in the 1947 United Nations proposed partition plan, the area was occupied by Israeli forces during the 1948 Arab–Israeli War and the remaining Arab population was expelled in 1950, after which a new Jewish moshav, now Hebraized as Zekharia, was founded on the site.

== Geography ==
Zakariyya زكرية Zakariya
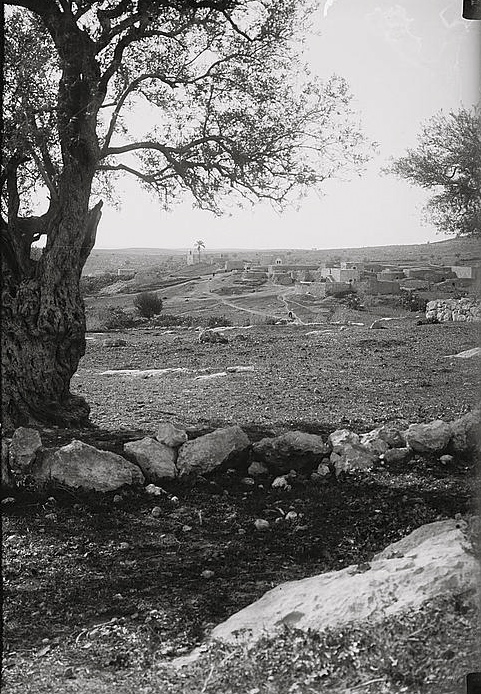
- Az-Zakariyya, pre-1926
- Etymology: "Zachariah"
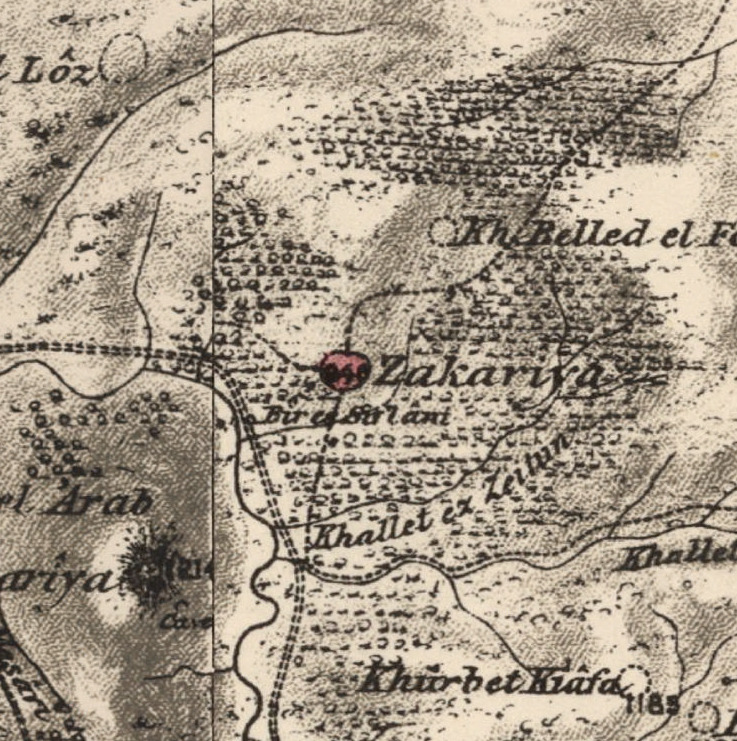
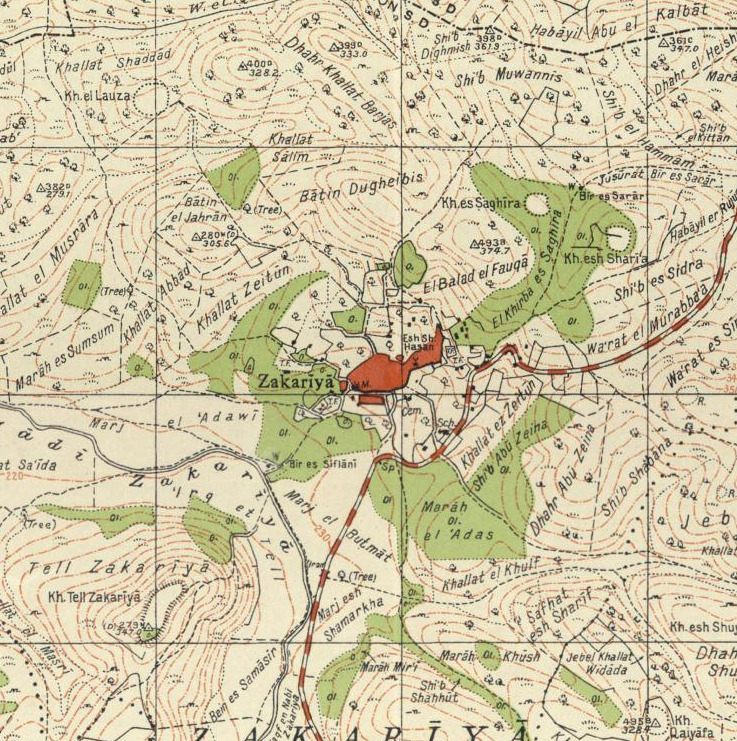
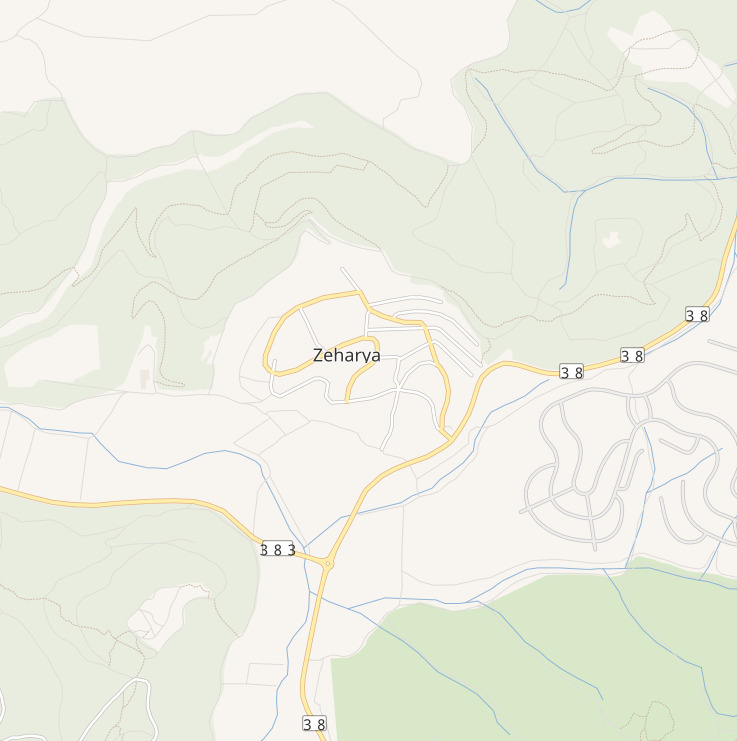
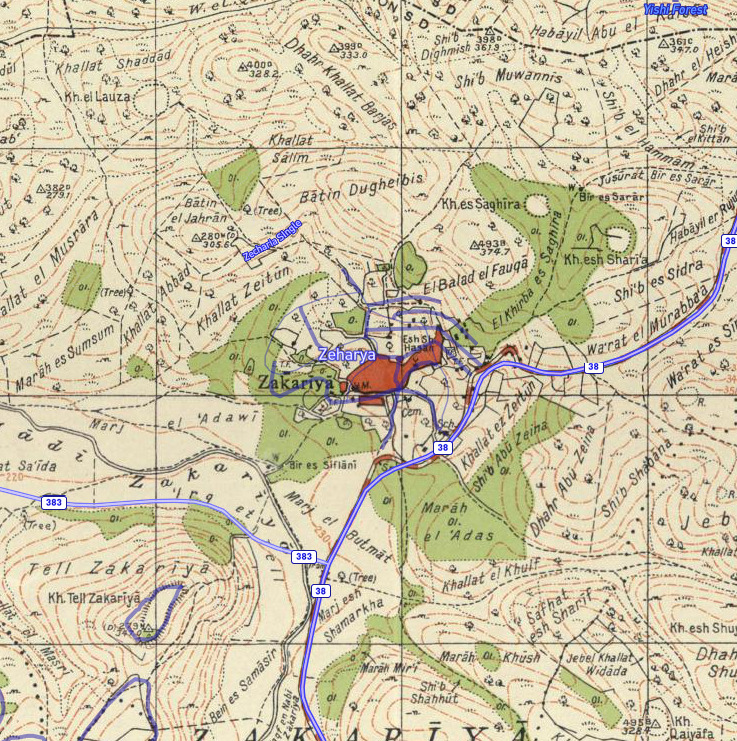
- 1870s map 1940s map modern map 1940s with modern overlay map A series of historical maps of the area around Az-Zakariyya (click the buttons)

- Location within Mandatory Palestine
- Palestine grid: 145/124
- Geopolitical entity: Mandatory Palestine
- Subdistrict: Hebron
- Date of depopulation: June, 1950

Area
  - Total: 15,320 dunams (15.32 km^{2}; 5.92 sq mi)

Population (1945)
  - Total: 1,180
- Cause(s) of depopulation: Expulsion by Yishuv forces
- Current Localities: Zekharia

Zekharia is located next to the road between Beit Guvrin (close to the former Bayt Jibrin) and the Jerusalem-Tel Aviv highway. It is bordered on the southeast by the Elah Valley, about 5 kilometres (3.1 mi) southwest of Beit Shemesh.

The hill of Tel Azekah (Tell Zakariya) can be seen to the southwest of the village, and rests upon a high hilltop, whereas the village lies on a slightly elevated part of the valley below. The hill rises to a maximum elevation of 348 meters above sea level, while the village itself has a mean elevation of 275 meters above sea level. The streams of Wadi Ajjur and al-Sarara are located a few kilometers north of the village.

== History ==
=== Antiquity ===
Beth Zacharia (on a nearby hill) is said to have existed in Roman times. According to legend, the body of the prophet Zechariah was found here in 415 CE and a church and monastery were established in the lower village by the same name. The Madaba Map displays the lower town as the burial site of the prophet Zechariah. The village lay beside the Tell, also called Az-Zakariyya.

A tomb, dating from the early Iron Age, has been excavated here. Among the pottery found in the grave was a figurine, representing Astarte.

A town called Beit Zacharia (var. Kefar Zacharia) existed on the hill in Roman times.

According to Sozomen, the body of the prophet Zachariah was found here in 415 C.E. and a church and monastery were established. The village was under the administrative jurisdiction of Bayt Jibrin.

=== Mamluk period ===
On April 29, 1309 (=Dhu al-Qa’da 18, in the Hijri year 708), in the early Mamluk era, two representatives from Az-Zakariyya; Farraj bin Sa‘d bin Furayj and Nassar bin ‘Amara bin Sa‘id; promised that the revenues of Az-Zakariyya should go to the Dome of the Rock and the Al-Aqsa Mosque.

However, by the end of Mamluk era, the village was a dependency of Hebron, and formed part of the waqf supporting the Ibrahimi Mosque. The villagers obtained their drinking water from two communal wells:- al-Saflani well which was drilled next to Wadi 'Ajjur, and al-Sarara well located north of the village.

In the 1480s C.E. Felix Fabri described how he stayed in a "roomy inn", next to a "fair mosque" in the village.

=== Ottoman period ===
In 1517, Az-Zakariyya was incorporated into the Ottoman Empire with the rest of Palestine, and in 1596 the village appeared in the Ottoman tax registers listed as Zakariyya al-Battih under the administration of the nahiya ("subdistrict") of Quds (Jerusalem), part of the Sanjak of Quds. It had a population of 47 Muslim households (an estimated 259 persons) and paid a fixed tax rate of 33,3% on wheat, barley, olives, beehives, and goats; a total of 11,000 akçe. All of the revenue went to a waqf.

Records from the Jerusalem Sharīʿa court describe recurrent hostilities in the seventeenth century between the villages of Zakariyya and ʿAjjūr, including attacks, destruction of crops, and killings. These conflicts illustrate the fragile security conditions of the Judean Foothills during the Early Ottoman period, which contributed to the decline and seasonalization of smaller rural settlements.

A Maqam (shrine) in the village dedicated to the prophet Zechariah was noticed by Edward Robinson in 1838, while van de Velde, recorded its name as Kefr Zakaria in the 1850s.

In 1863 Victor Guérin found the place to have five hundred inhabitants, while an Ottoman village list of about 1870 showed that Az-Zakariyya had 41 houses and a population of 128, though the population count included men only.

In 1883, the PEF's Survey of Western Palestine described Zakariyya as sitting on a slope above a broad valley surrounded by olive groves.

In 1896 the population of (Tell) Zakarja was estimated to be about 636 persons.

=== British Mandate era ===
In the 1922 census of Palestine conducted by the British Mandate authorities, Zakaria had a population of 683, all Muslim, increasing in the 1931 census to 742, still all Muslims, in 189 occupied houses.

In the 1945 statistics the population was 1,180, all Muslims, with a total of 15,320 dunams of land. In 1944/45 a total of 6,523 dunums of village land was allocated to cereals, 961 dunums were irrigated or used for orchards, of which 440 dunums were planted with olive trees, while 70 dunams were built-up (urban) areas. In the 1946 Tax Form of Mandatory Palestine, there were 357 "assessable inhabitants" living in Zakariyya, of which 232 were landowners.

=== 1948 and aftermath ===
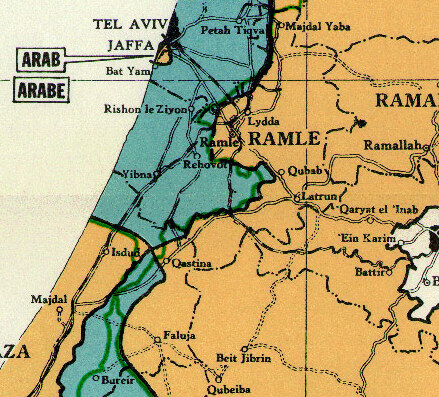
UN Partition Plan – Az-Zakariyya was located on the main road north of Beit Jibrin, at the northern edge of the Hebron Subdistrict, Mandatory Palestine.

The village was located inside the territory allotted to a future Arab state in the UN's 1947 partition plan.

In the 1948 Arab–Israeli War, Az-Zakariyya was the longest lasting Arab community in the southern Jerusalem Corridor. The village was captured in October 1948 during Operation Ha-Har, when the Israeli military used artillery to shell Az-Zakariyya and stormed the village at night. In the course of Operation Yoav, the 54th Battalion of the Givati Brigade, found the village "almost empty", as most of the residents had temporarily fled to the nearby hills. Two residents were executed by Israeli soldiers. Many of the villagers returned to their homes after the cessation of hostilities. In December 1948 the army evicted about 40 "old men and women" to the West Bank.

In March 1949 the Interior Ministry requested the eviction of "145 or so" remaining villagers: the official in charge of the Jerusalem District said there were many good houses in the village which could be used to accommodate several hundred new Jewish immigrants. In January 1950 David Ben-Gurion, Moshe Sharett and Yosef Weitz decided to evict the villagers, "but without coercion."

On March 19, 1950, the transfer of the Arabs of Zakariya was approved and the last eviction was carried out on June 9, 1950, on the orders of David Ben-Gurion, Moshe Sharett and Yosef Weitz, and most ended up on the-then Jordanian-occupied West Bank refugee camps of al-Arroub and Dheisheh Refugee Camp, where the village's war refugees had settled. The manner of expulsion of the villagers is not mentioned.

Many evictions were on 17 May 1950 by the military. Fifteen families comprising 65 people, were transferred to the town of Ramla, while the rest of the community, some 130 people, were taken to a location near the Jordanian border where they were ordered to walk over. To hasten the process, "soldiers shot in the air several times".

=== State of Israel ===
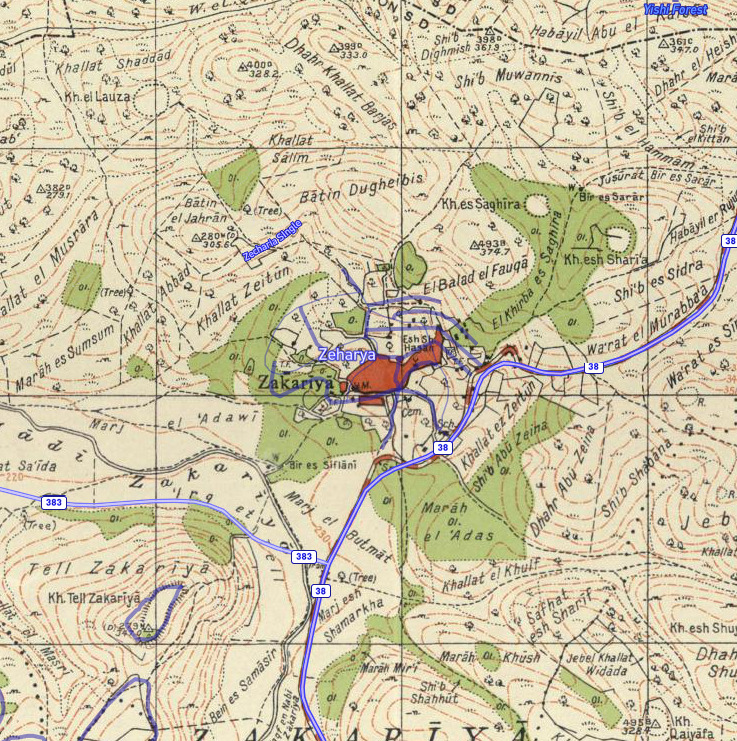
1940s Survey of Palestine map of az-Zakariyya, overlaid with the modern street layout of Zekharia

Two weeks after the village was emptied, the Jewish Agency resettled families of Jewish-Kurdish settlers near the village, later moving them inside the former Palestinian village to become residents of a new moshav, now Hebraized as Zekharia. Most of the resettled families were Kurdish Jewish immigrants.

During the 1960s, most of the older buildings in the village were decrepit and unsafe and had to be demolished to make room for new, safer housing. Some view this as part of a national program to "level" depopulated villages.

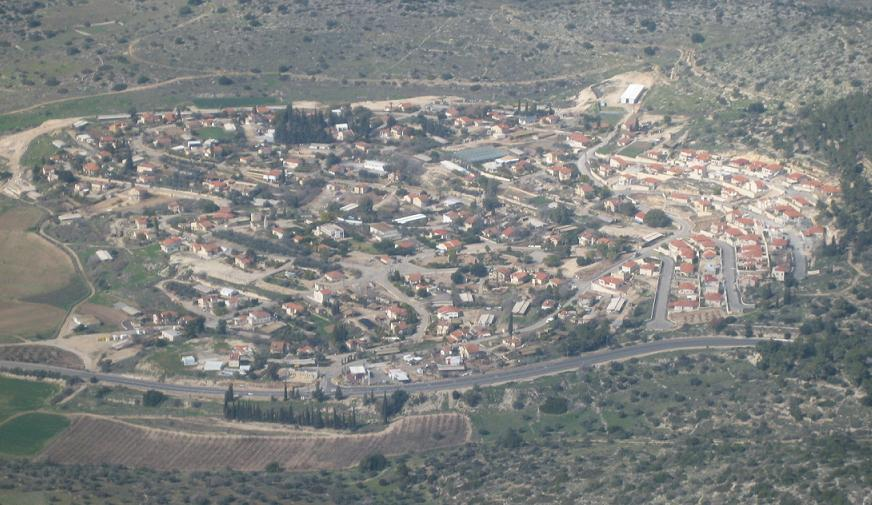
Zekharia

In 1992, Walid Khalidi described the remaining structures of the Arab village: "The mosque and a number of houses, some occupied by Jewish residents and others deserted, remain on the site. Large sections of the site itself are covered with wild vegetation. The mosque is in a state of neglect and an Israeli flag is planted on top of the minaret. [..] One of the occupied houses is a two-storey stone structure with a flat roof. Its second story windows have round arches and grillwork. Parts of the surrounding lands are cultivated by Israeli farmers."

== Landmarks ==
The tomb of Zecharia, which has been attributed to both the Hebrew prophet Zecharia and Zechariah, father of John the Baptist, is located on the moshav, within the mosque. The site is mentioned in sources as early as the fourth century, in the writings of Sozomenos, and it appears on the Madaba map.

In the 1970s, there was a resurgence of Jewish interest in the site, which became a pilgrimage destination for Jews from Kurdistan, Iraq, Iran, Cochin and elsewhere in India, and elsewhere, who prayed there and lit candles.

== Culture ==
The previous village was known for its Palestinian costumes. A wedding dress from Zakariyya (ca. 1930) is part of the collection in Museum of International Folk Art (MOIFA) at Museum of New Mexico at Santa Fe.

== Notable residents ==
British mandate period

- Nasr Abdel Aziz Eleyan

== Gallery ==
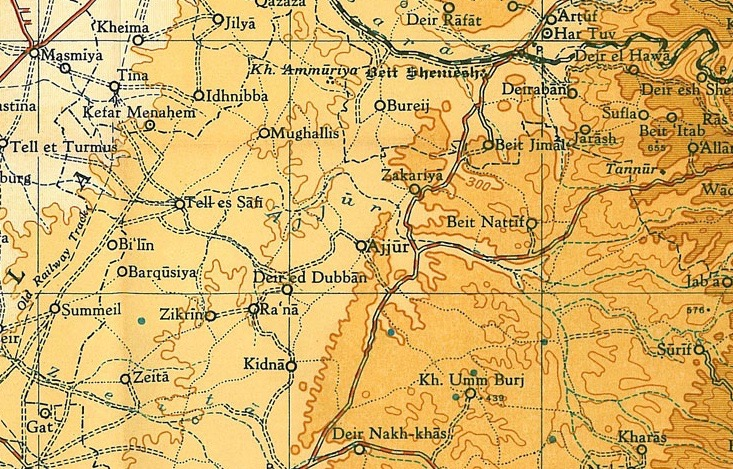
Az-Zakariyya 1945 1:250,000

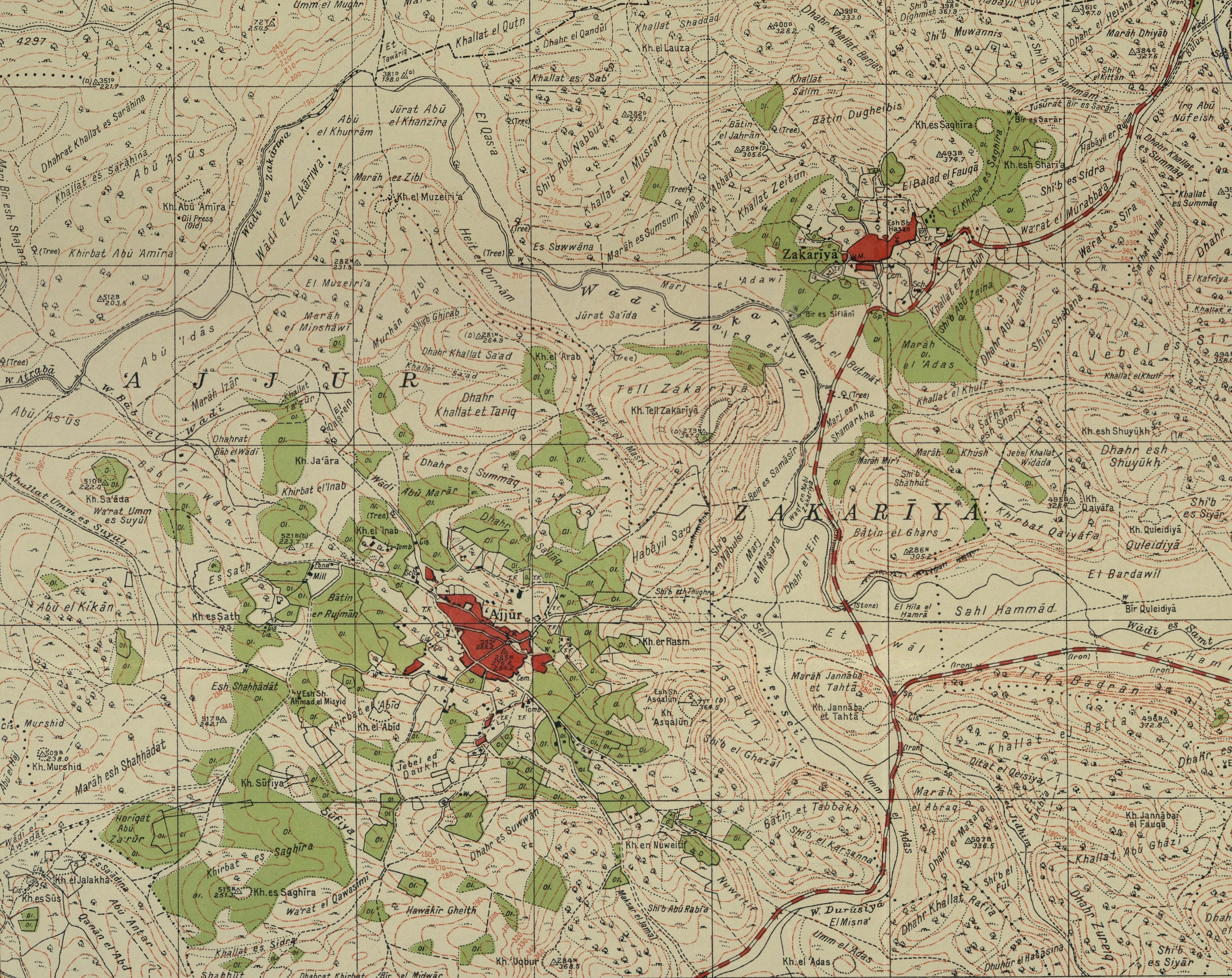
Az-Zakariyya 1947 1:20,000

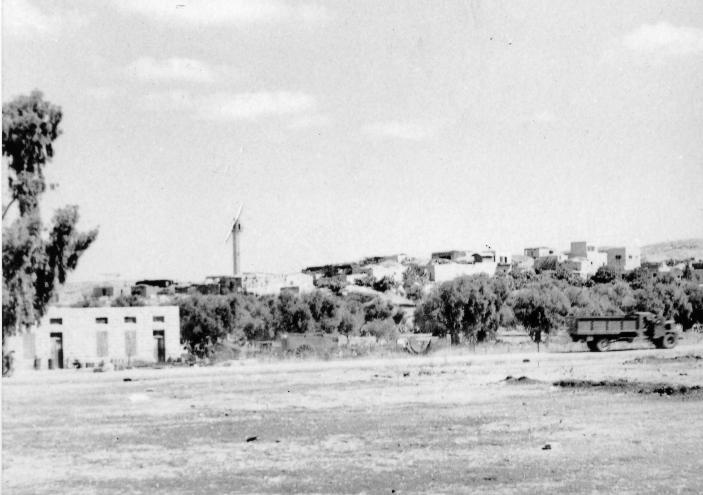
Az-Zakariyya 1948

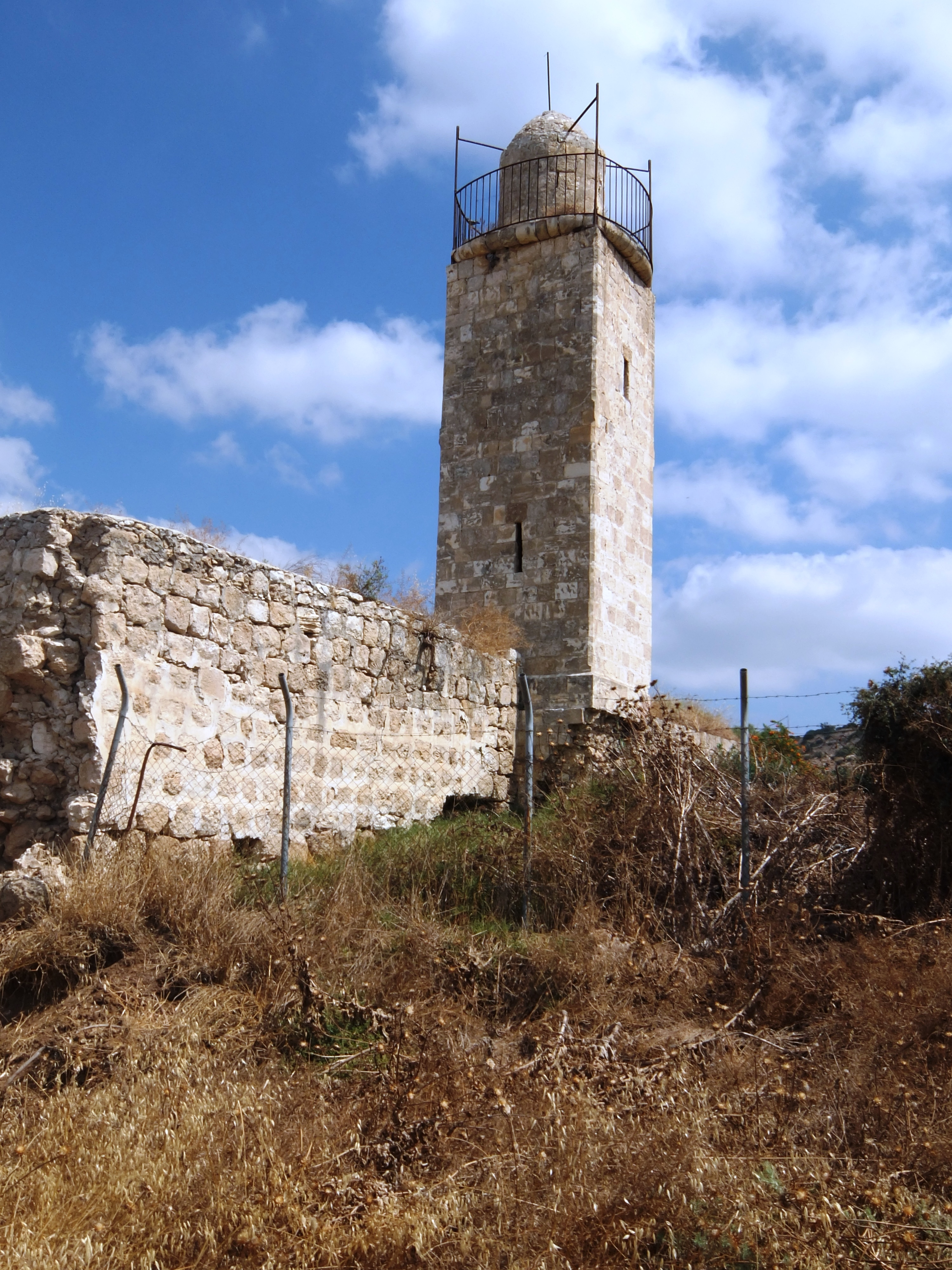
Mosque of Az-Zakariyya, 2015, containing the tomb of Zacharias

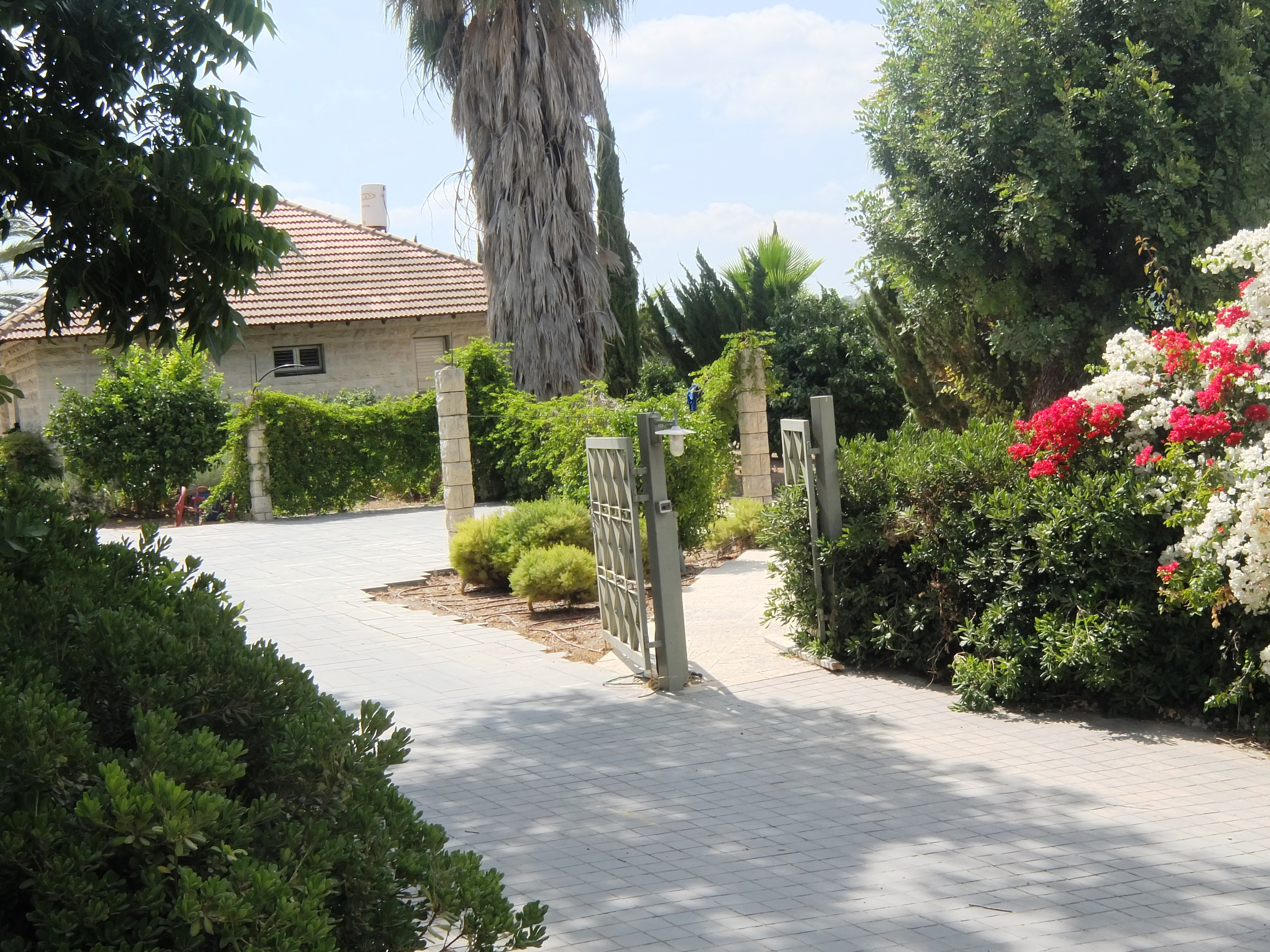
Homes in Moshav Zekharia

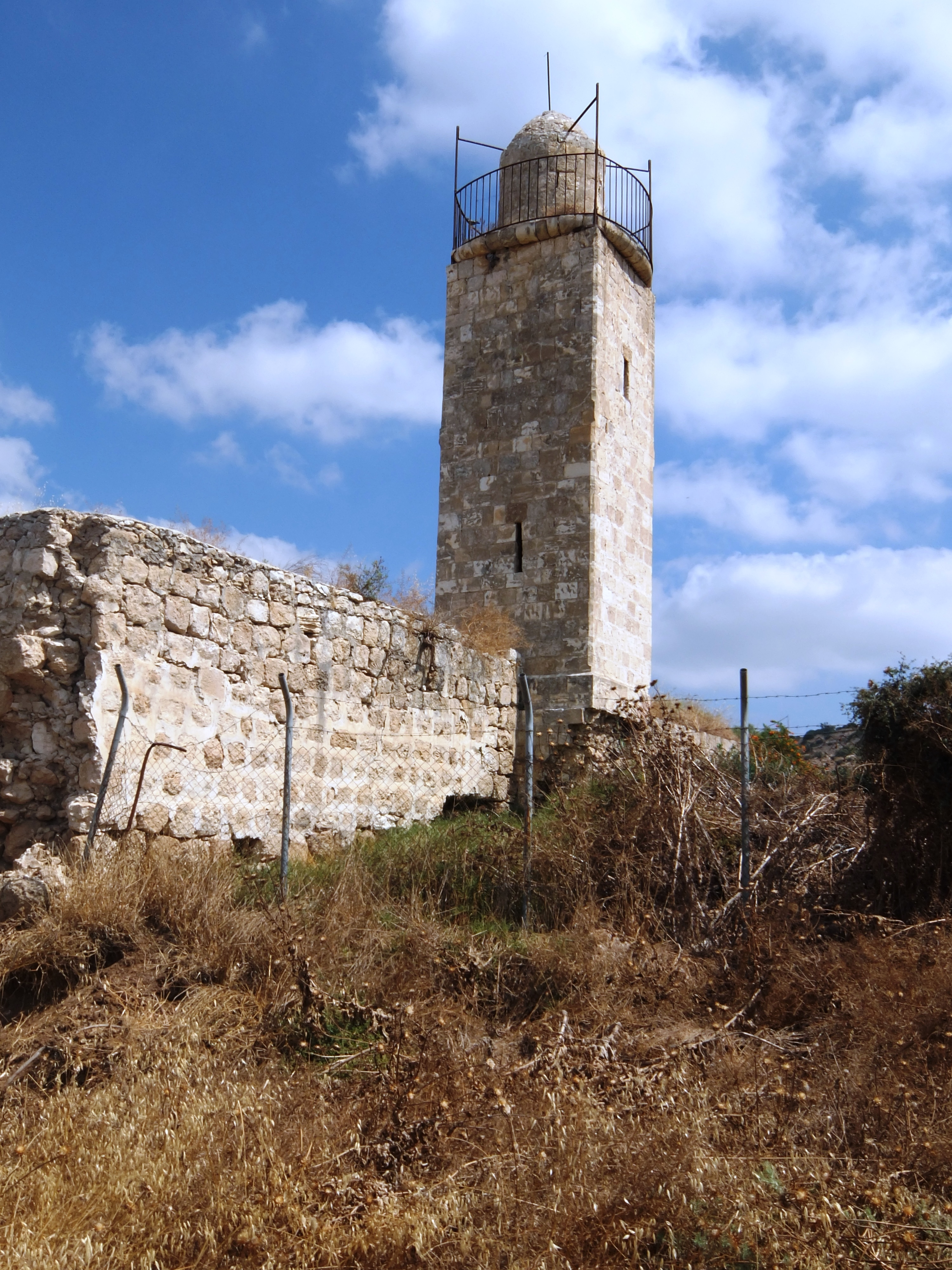
Remains of a minaret and mosque

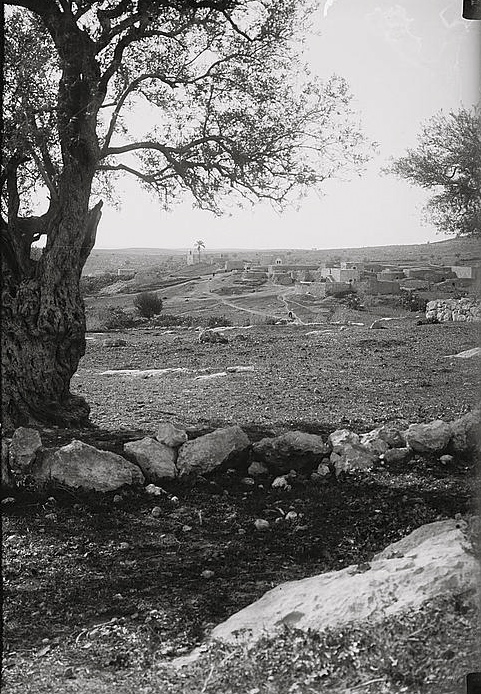
Az-Zakariyya, pre-1926

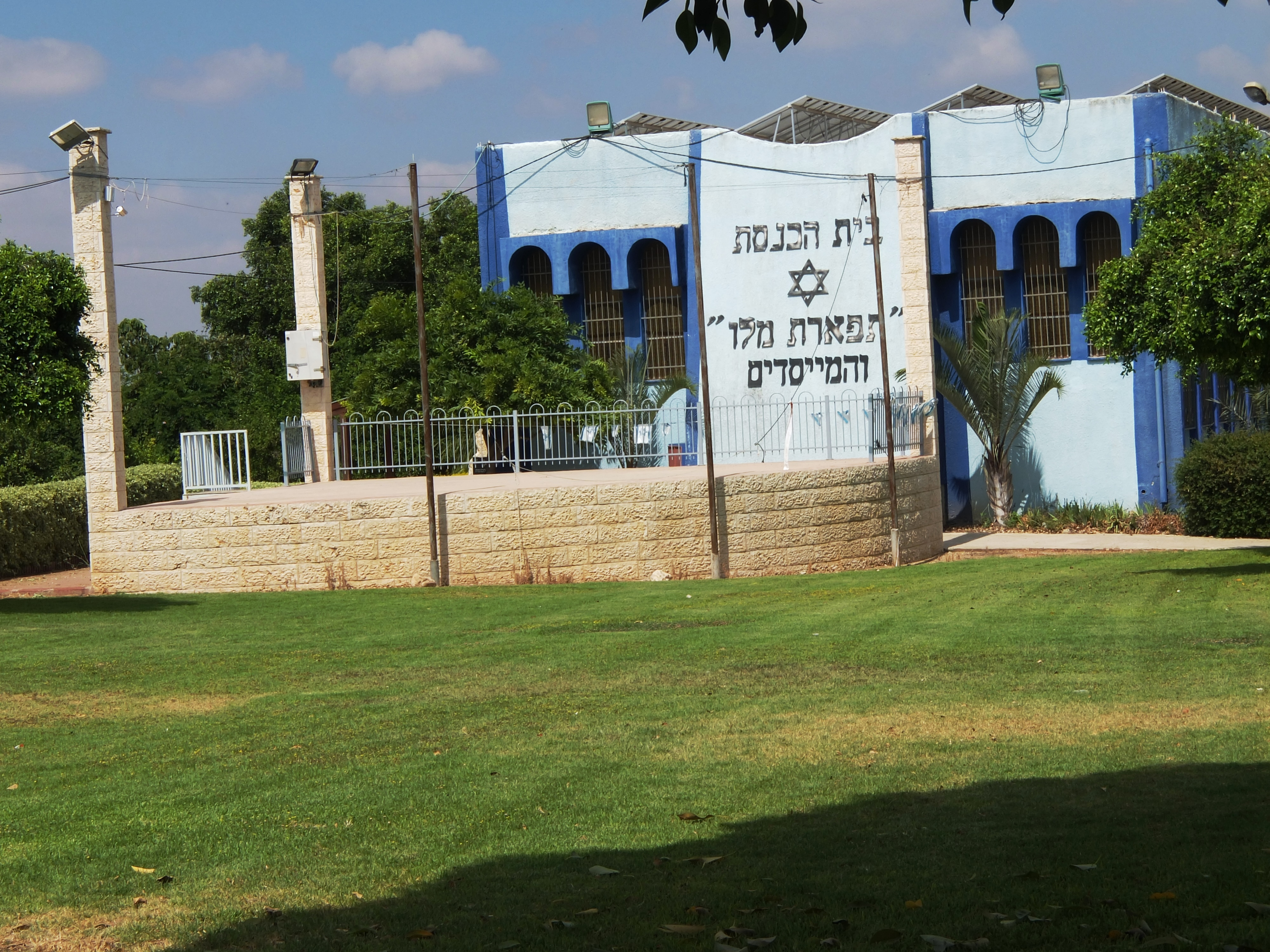
Main synagogue

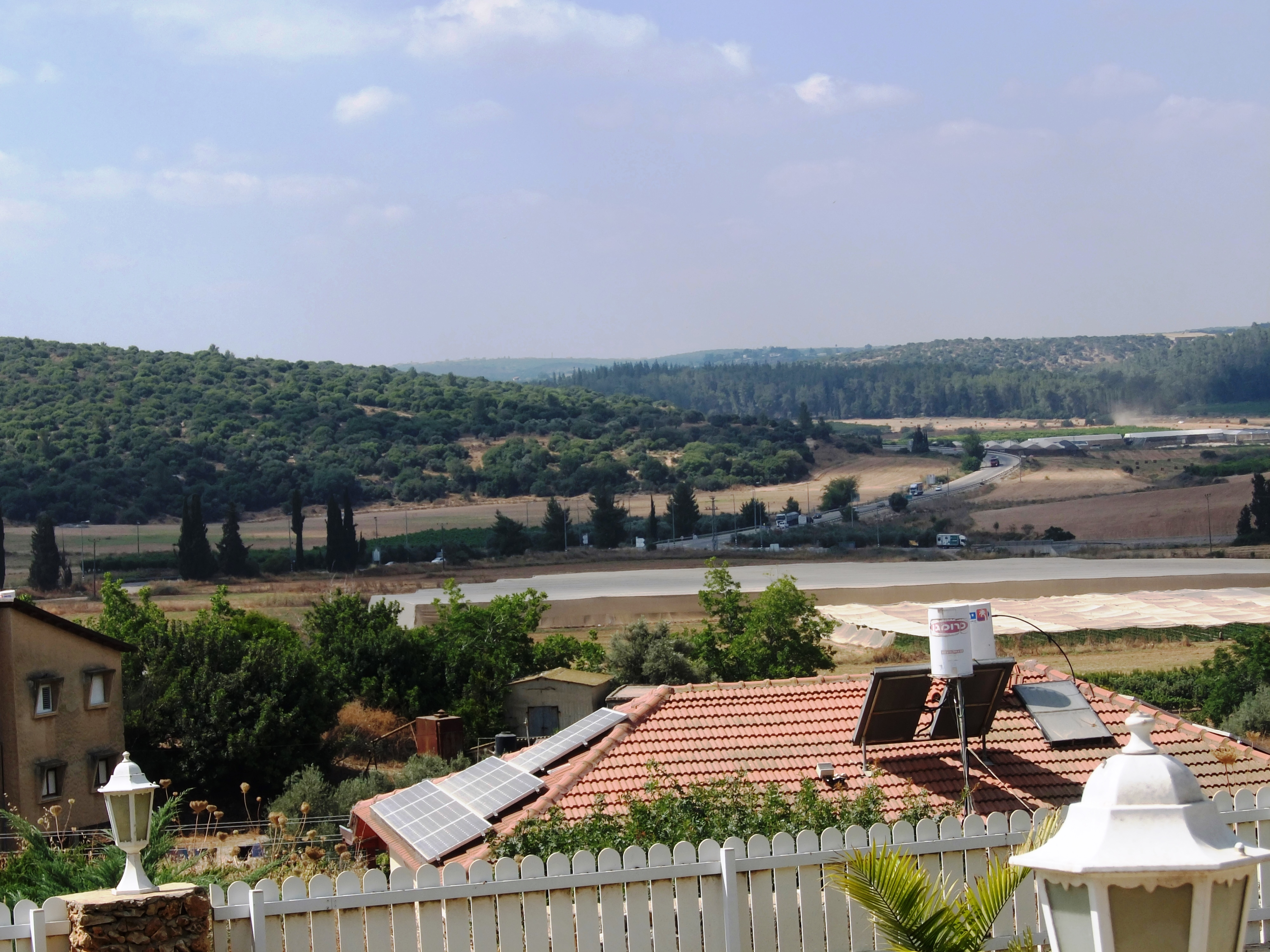
View from southeast and the Elah Valley

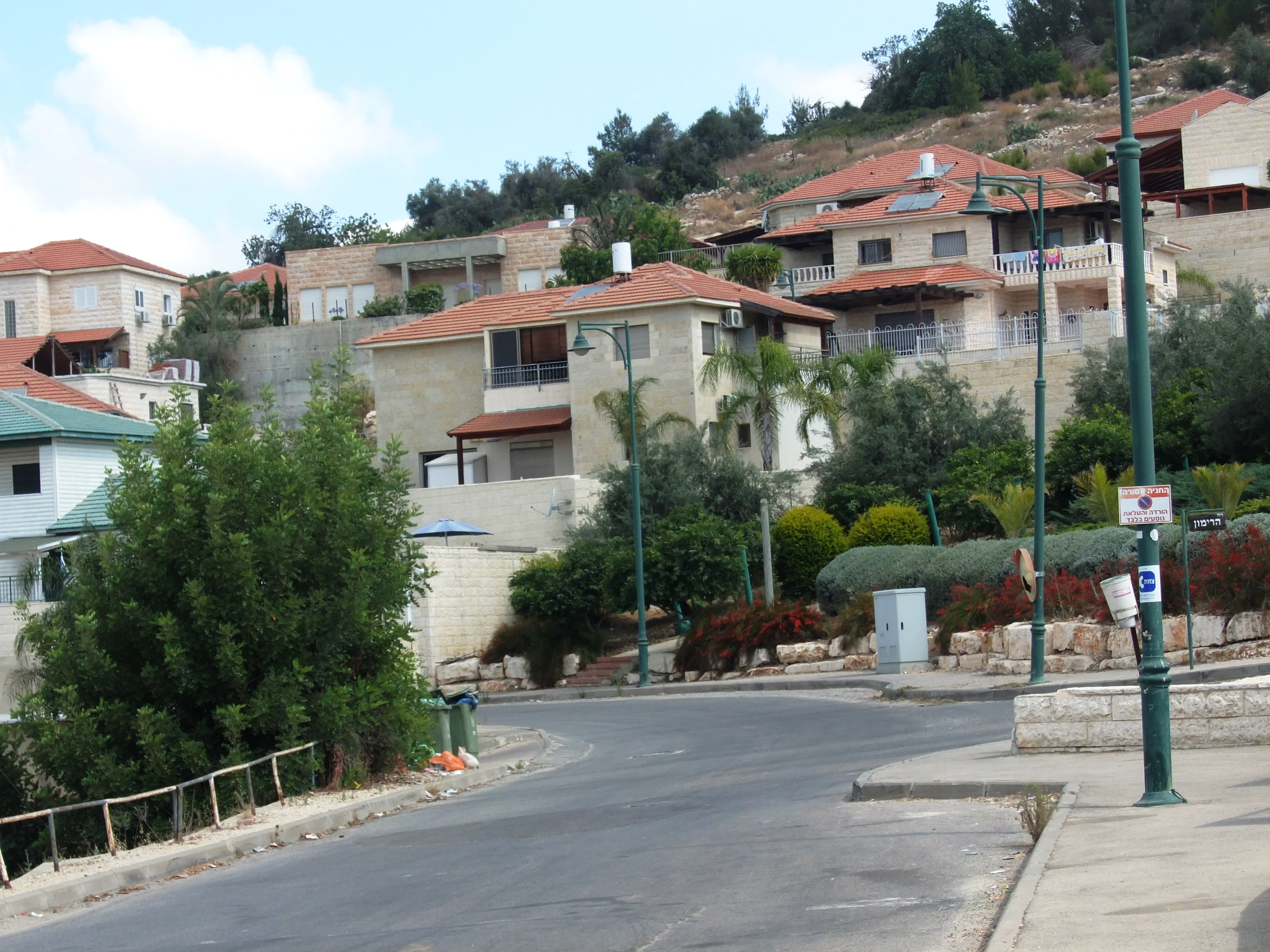
Residential neighborhood on adjacent hilltop

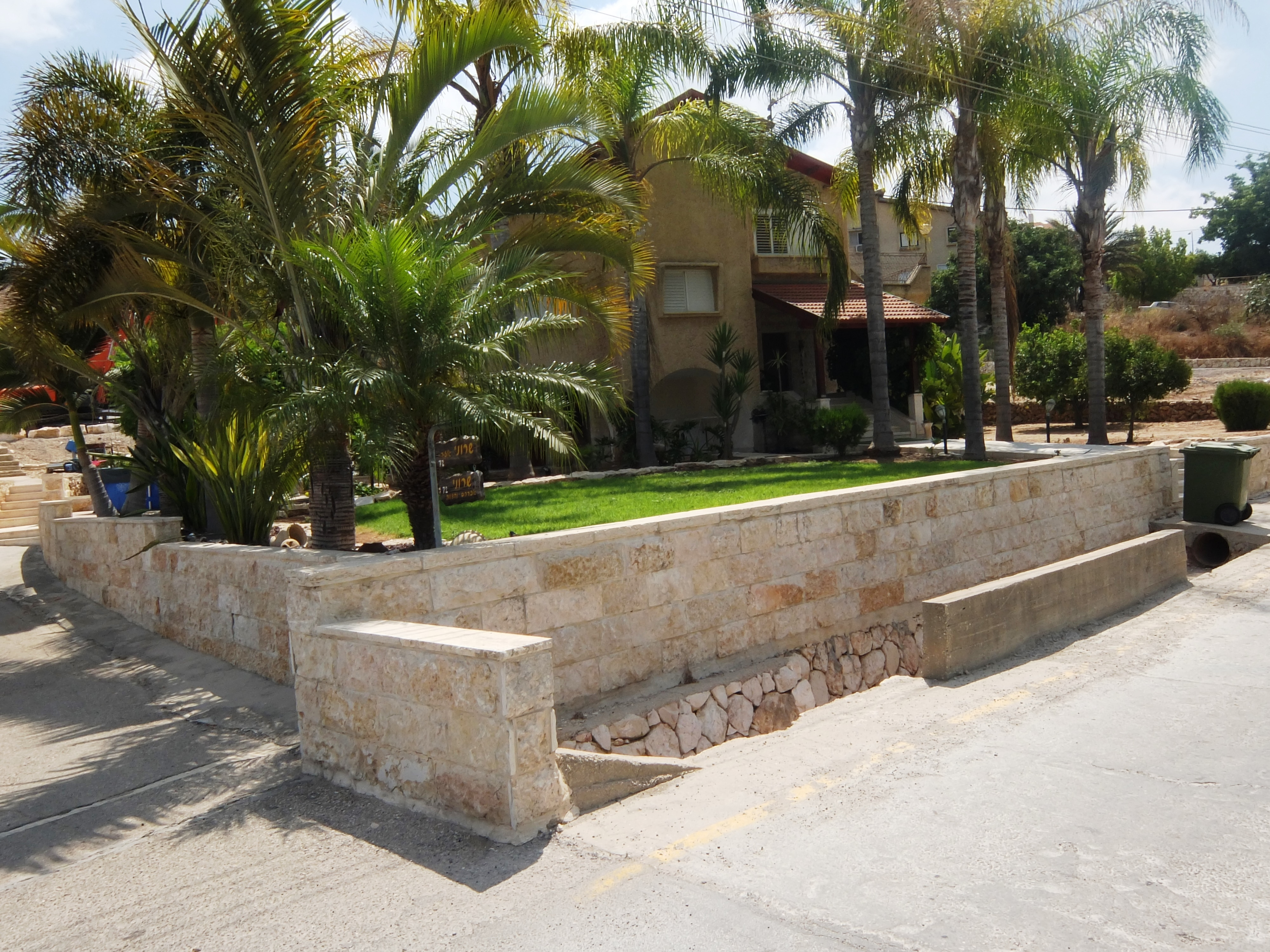
House in Zekharia

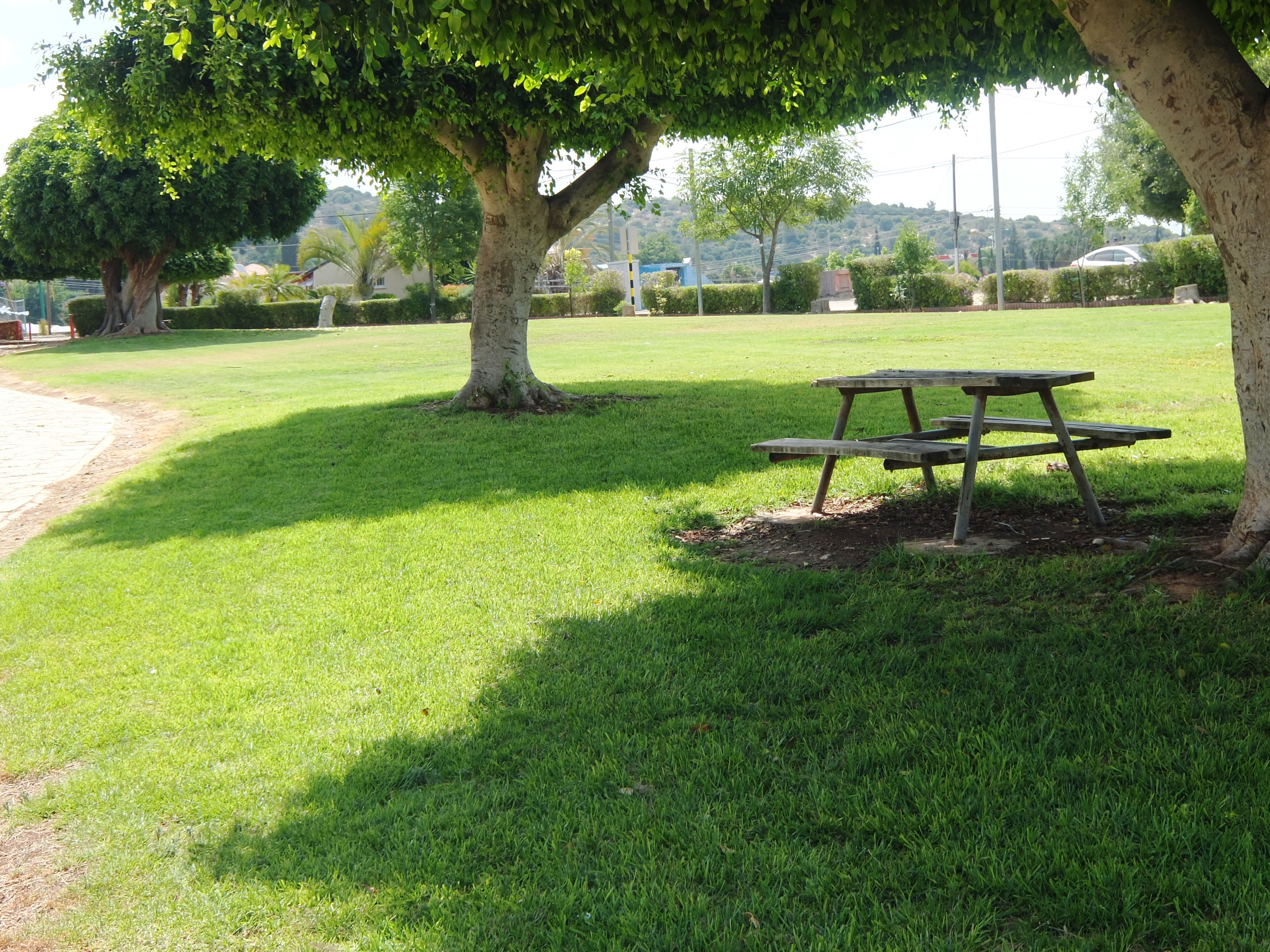
Public park

== Bibliography ==
- Morris, Benny (2004). The Birth of the Palestinian Refugee Problem Revisited. Cambridge: Cambridge University Press. ISBN 978-0-521-00967-6.
- Petersen, Andrew (2001). A Gazetteer of Buildings in Muslim Palestine (British Academy Monographs in Archaeology). Vol. 1. Oxford University Press. ISBN 978-0-19-727011-0.
- Al Jundi, S.; Marlowe, Jen (2011). Hour of Sunlight. Nation Books. ISBN 978-1-56858-631-1. Zakariyya: pp. 1–17
- Baramki, D. C. (1935). "An early Iron Age Tomb at Ez Zahiriyye". Quarterly of the Department of Antiquities in Palestine. 4: 109–110.
- Barron, J.B., ed. (1923). Palestine: Report and General Abstracts of the Census of 1922. Government of Palestine.
- Conder, C.R.; Kitchener, H.H. (1883). The Survey of Western Palestine: Memoirs of the Topography, Orography, Hydrography, and Archaeology. Vol. 3. London: Committee of the Palestine Exploration Fund.
- Fabri, F. (1893). Felix Fabri (circa 1480–1483 A.D.) vol II, part II. Palestine Pilgrims' Text Society.
- Government of Palestine, Department of Statistics (1945). Village Statistics, April, 1945.
- Guérin, V. (1869). Description Géographique Historique et Archéologique de la Palestine (in French). Vol. 1: Judee, pt. 2. Paris: L'Imprimerie Nationale.
- Hadawi, S. (1970). Village Statistics of 1945: A Classification of Land and Area ownership in Palestine. Palestine Liberation Organization Research Centre.
- Hartmann, M. (1883). "Die Ortschaftenliste des Liwa Jerusalem in dem türkischen Staatskalender für Syrien auf das Jahr 1288 der Flucht (1871)". Zeitschrift des Deutschen Palästina-Vereins. 6: 102–149.
- Hütteroth, W.-D.; Abdulfattah, K. (1977). Historical Geography of Palestine, Transjordan and Southern Syria in the Late 16th Century. Erlanger Geographische Arbeiten, Sonderband 5. Erlangen, Germany: Vorstand der Fränkischen Geographischen Gesellschaft. ISBN 3-920405-41-2.
- Khalidi, W. (1992). All That Remains: The Palestinian Villages Occupied and Depopulated by Israel in 1948. Washington D.C.: Institute for Palestine Studies. ISBN 0-88728-224-5.
- Mills, E., ed. (1932). Census of Palestine 1931. Population of Villages, Towns and Administrative Areas. Jerusalem: Government of Palestine.
- Morris, B. (2004). The Birth of the Palestinian Refugee Problem Revisited. Cambridge University Press. ISBN 978-0-521-00967-6.
- Moudjir ed-dyn al-'Ulaymi (1876). Sauvaire (ed.). Histoire de Jérusalem et d'Hébron depuis Abraham jusqu'à la fin du XVe siècle de J.-C. : fragments de la Chronique de Moudjir-ed-dyn.
- Palmer, E.H. (1881). The Survey of Western Palestine: Arabic and English Name Lists Collected During the Survey by Lieutenants Conder and Kitchener, R. E. Transliterated and Explained by E.H. Palmer. Committee of the Palestine Exploration Fund.
- Petersen, Andrew (2001). A Gazetteer of Buildings in Muslim Palestine. British Academy Monographs in Archaeology. Vol. 1. Oxford University Press. ISBN 978-0-19-727011-0.
- Pringle, D. (1993). The Churches of the Crusader Kingdom of Jerusalem: A-K (excluding Acre and Jerusalem). Vol. I. Cambridge University Press. ISBN 0-521-39036-2.
- Robinson, E.; Smith, E. (1841). Biblical Researches in Palestine, Mount Sinai and Arabia Petraea: A Journal of Travels in the year 1838. Vol. 2. Boston: Crocker & Brewster.
- Schick, C. (1896). "Zur Einwohnerzahl des Bezirks Jerusalem". Zeitschrift des Deutschen Palästina-Vereins. 19: 120–127.
- Socin, A. (1879). "Alphabetisches Verzeichniss von Ortschaften des Paschalik Jerusalem". Zeitschrift des Deutschen Palästina-Vereins. 2: 135–163.
- Sozomen (1855). The Ecclesiastical History of Sozomen: Comprising a History of the Church from A.D. 324 to A.D. 440. Henry G. Bohn.
- Stillman, Yedida Kalfon (1979). Palestinian Costume and Jewelry. Albuquerque: University of New Mexico Press. ISBN 0-8263-0490-7. (A catalog of the Museum of International Folk Art (MOIFA) at Santa Fe's collection of Palestinian clothing and jewellery.)
- van de Velde, C.W.M. (1858). Memoir to Accompany the Map of the Holy Land. Gotha: Justus Perthes.
