= Taysir Batniji =

Palestinian multidisciplinary artist (born 1966)

- تيسير البطنيجي
- Born: December 14, 1966 (age 59); Gaza, Palestine
- Citizenship: Palestinian; French (as of 2012)
- Education: An-Najah National University, École nationale supérieure d'art de Bourges
- Occupations: Photographer, video artist, installation art, sculptor, painter
- Notable work: Watchtowers (2008), To My Brother (2012–2020), Disruptions (2015–2017)
- Website: www.taysirbatniji.com

Taysir Batniji (Arabic: تيسير البطنيجي; born 1966) is a Palestinian multidisciplinary artist, living in Paris. He is known primarily as a photographer, and video artist; and in his early career he worked as an installation artist, sculptor, and painter. His work addresses issues of the psychological effects of conflict. Batniji's work has been shown widely in the United States, Europe and the Middle East, including at the Venice Biennale. He has lived in France since 1994.

== Early life, family and education ==
Taysir Batniji was born in 1966, in Gaza. He had eight siblings, and was the second to last born in the family. During the first intifada in 1987, one of his brothers died due to Israeli snipers. In November 2023, Batniji's family lost fifty-two members due to Israeli bombs during the Gaza war.

Batniji studied fine art and painting at An-Najah National University in Nablus. In 1994, he was awarded a fellowship to study at the École nationale supérieure d'art de Bourges (ENSA; English: School of Fine Arts of Bourges) in Bourges, France. He obtained French nationality in 2012.

== Career ==
Batniji's artwork is often displaying personal history, and the ongoing conflicts in Gaza. Gaza Diary (2001) is a short film by Batniji, which can be found online.

Batniji's Watchtowers (2008) series feature black and white photographs of Israeli watchtowers on the West Bank. Watchtowers (2008) was influenced by the 2004 Bernd and Hilla Becher retrospective at the Pompidou Centre in Paris, which displayed the Bechers' German industrial building photographs, displayed in an organized grid format.

To My Brother (2012 and 2020) is a series of 60 hand carvings on paper, dedicated to his brother that died in 1987. In 2012, he was awarded the Abraaj Capital Art Prize, for the To My Brother series.

His series Disruptions (April 2015 and June 2017), consist of pixelated screenshot images taken from WhatsApp video calls during a period of violence, which are a visual reminder of our instability, fragility and the need for human connection. The Disruptions series was published in 2024 as an art book, with all of the profits going to the British medical charity, Medical Aid for Palestinians.

Batniji's artwork is in museum collections, including at the Centre Pompidou in Paris; the V&A Museum in London; the Mathaf: Arab Museum of Modern Art in Doha, Qatar; and the Institut Valencià d'Art Modern (IVAM) in Valencia, Spain.

== Exhibitions ==
=== Solo exhibitions ===
- Diplopie (2016), solo exhibition, Espace d’Art Contemporain André Malraux, Colmar, France
- Home Away From Home* (2018), solo exhibition, Aperture Foundation, New York City, New York, USA
- Suspended Time (2019), solo exhibition, Prefix Institut of Contemporary Art, Toronto, Ontario, Canada
- No Condition Is Permanent (2022–2023), solo retrospective exhibition, Mathaf: Arab Museum of Modern Art, Doha, Qatar

=== Group exhibitions ===
- The Future of a Promise (2011) group exhibition, 54th Venice Biennale, Venice, Italy
- Rights of Future Generation (2019) group exhibition, 1st Sharjah Architecture Triennial, Sharjah, UAE
- 14th Fellbach Triennial (2019) group exhibition, Fellbach, Baden-Württemberg, Germany
- 7th Yokohama Triennale (2020) group exhibition, Yokohama, Japan
- 12th Berlin Biennale (2022) group exhibition, Berlin, Germany

== See also ==
- List of Palestinian artists
