= Shadi Alzaqzouq =

Libyan-born Palestinian artist (born 1981)

- شادي الزقزوق
- Born: 1981 (age 44–45); Benghazi, Libya
- Other name: Shadi Al-Zaqzouq
- Education: Palestine Technical College, Paris 8 University Vincennes-Saint-Denis (BFA)
- Occupations: Visual artist, activist, musician
- Known for: Painting
- Notable work: After the Wash

Shadi Alzaqzouq (Arabic: شادي الزقزوق; born 1981), also known as Shadi Al-Zaqzouq, is a Libyan-born Palestinian visual artist, activist, and musician. His hyperrealist paintings focus on themes of evolution and land occupation. Alzaqzouq has lived in France since 2007.

== Early life and education ==
Shadi Alzaqzouq was born in 1981, in Benghazi, Libya. His parents immigrated to Libya from Jaffa, Palestine. The family moved in 1995 to Gaza in Palestine, after the 1995 Oslo II Accord.

He studied music at the Palestine Technical College in Deir al-Balah, where he graduated. He moved to Paris in 2007 to continued his studies in painting at Paris 8 University Vincennes-Saint-Denis, where he graduated with a BFA degree in 2009.

== Career ==
He taught music for the next five years in a primary school in Gaza. In 2002, Alzaqzouq joined an artist collective known as Shababeek (Arabic: شبابيك, lit. 'windows'), in Gaza. He won the art residency award at the "International City of Arts" in Paris from the Abdul Mohsen Qattan Foundation and the French Consulate in 2006.

Alzaqzouq's work After the Wash was one of four works removed from the 2012 Art Dubai art fair for supporting the Arab Spring protests. The work in question was titled After the Wash, and is a circular canvas with an oil painting depicted a veiled girl with a bandana carrying underwear, that has a word in Arabic meaning "leave".

In 2015, Alzaqzouq was initially removed from Banksy’s Dismaland exhibition after he protested in support of the boycott of Israel and the three Israeli artists participating in the show, which included a former Israel Defense Forces (IDF) member. Afterwards he covered his artwork After Washing #3 with a bedsheet with the words "RIP Gaza: Boycott Israel" written on it, and laid down in front of the display during the Dismaland exhibition. Days later his artwork was returned to the exhibition.

== See also ==
- List of Palestinian artists
- List of Palestinian painters
- List of Libyan artists
