= Palestine Technical College =

College in Gaza Strip, Palestine

Coordinates: 31.41771°N 34.35162°E

- Type: Public
- Established: 1996
- President: Salem A. Sabbah
- Dean: Haitham Khalil Ayesh
- Chairman of Board of Trustees: Farouq Momtaz Alfranji
- Location: Deir al-Balah, Palestine
- Website: www.ptcdb.edu.ps

The Palestine Technical College (Arabic: كلية فلسطين التقنية, romanized: Kullīyat Filasṭīn al-Tiqniyah) is a college in Deir El-Balah, Gaza Strip, Palestine. The college offers bachelor degree programs and 2-year associate degrees in technical education at the post-secondary level, as well as programs for different target groups through continuing education. Its professors' research has been cited more than 10,000 times.

== History ==
It is a governmental college that was established in 1993. Currently there are more than 1800 students enrolled in the college in 20 diploma programs and 8 B.Sc. programs. The main college campus is located at the city of Deir El-Balah. The college has a branch campus in the north of Gaza City. In the academic year 2015/2016, PTC employed around 200 full time employees of which 120 were academic staff.

The university co-ran a European Union-funded, joint Erasmus+ project in 3D garment design training with Jordanian University of Science and Technology; Dr. Derar Eleyan directed Palestine Technical College's part in the project.

In early 2023, students at the university launched a faculty-backed information campaign about the dangers of illegal boat migration, which was becoming popular among young Gazans disenchanted with the economic situation under siege. Later that year, the university was used as a shelter for displaced Palestinians during the Israeli invasion of the Gaza Strip; its buildings were damaged by Israeli military strikes. In October 2024, the university announced via Facebook that it would launch remote learning for its students the following month via the platform Moodle after a year of closure during the war.

Notable alumni include Shadi Alzaqzouq.
