= List of Libyan artists =

The following list of Libyan artists (in alphabetical order by last name) includes artists of various genres, who are notable and are either born in Libya, of Libyan descent or who produce works that are primarily about Libya.

== A ==
- Arwa Abouon (1982–2020), Libyan-born Canadian photographer, of Amazigh descent
- Shadi Alzaqzouq (born 1981), Libyan-born Palestinian painter; lives in France

== E ==
- Ali Omar Ermes (born 1945), calligrapher, author

== J ==
- Mahmoud Jalal (1911–1975), Libyan-born Syrian modernist artist, painter, sculptor, and medalist

== U ==
- Fathi Uraybi (1942–2015), photographer, filmmaker, educator, graphic designer, author

== See also ==
- List of Libyan Americans
- Libyan culture
