= Basel Abbas and Ruanne Abou-Rahme =

Palestinian artist duo

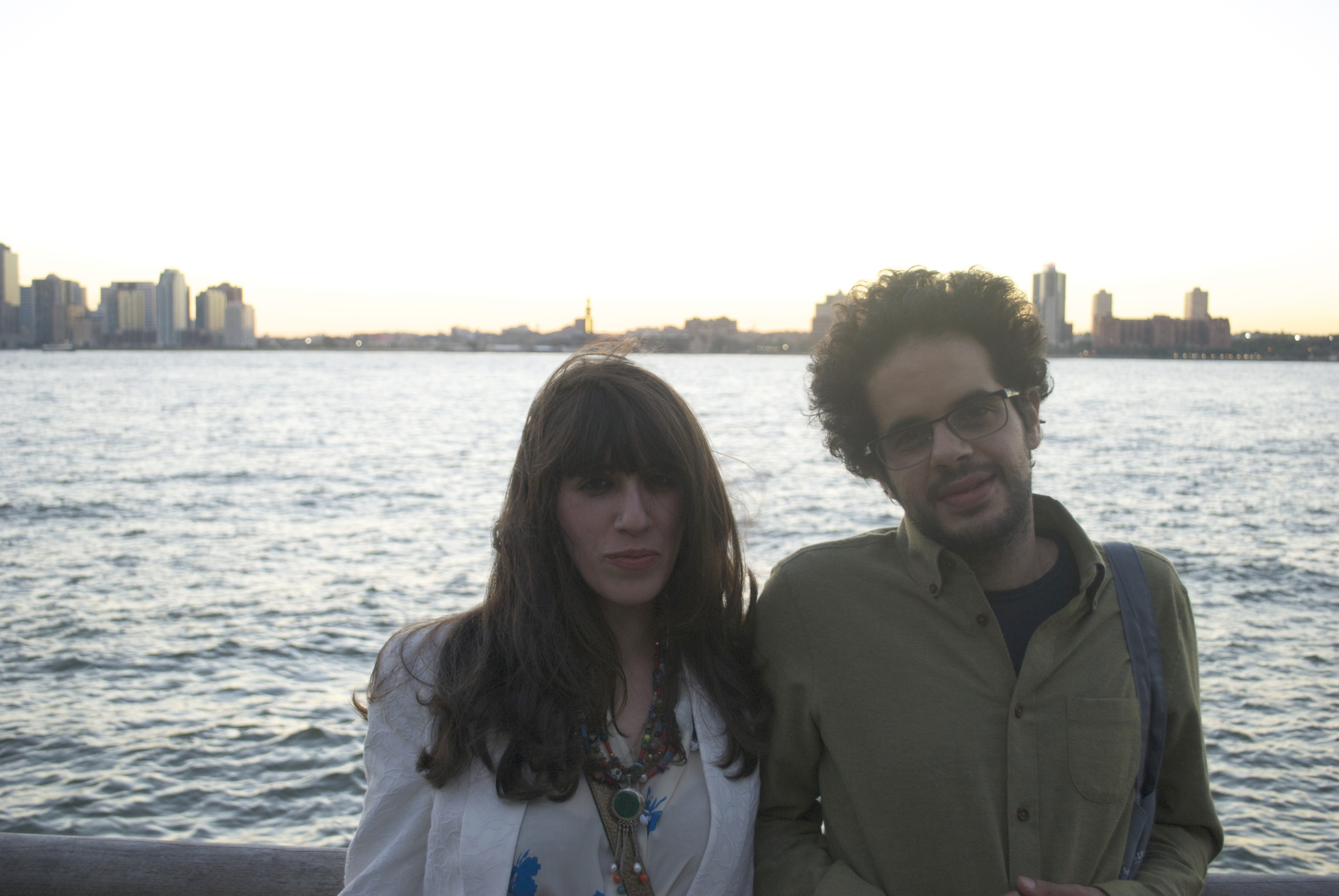
- Abou-Rahme and Abbas (2006)
- Nickname: Abbas and Abou-Rahme
- Type: Artist duo
- Fields: Video art, installation art, sound art, performance art
- Website: Official website

Basel Abbas and Ruanne Abou-Rahme (both born 1983), are an artist duo. Abbas is a Cypriot of Palestinian-descent visual artist and filmmaker; and Abou-Rahme is an American of Palestinian-descent visual artist and filmmaker. They utilize images, audio, text, installations, and performance in their work.

== About ==
Basel Abbas was born in 1983 in Nicosia, Cyprus. Abbas worked as a sound engineer for the hip hop trio, Ramallah Underground. He has also worked as an installation artist, video artist, and performance artist.

Ruanne Abou-Rahme was born in 1983 in Boston, Massachusetts, U.S.

They work between Ramallah and New York City.

== History ==
Abbas and Abou-Rahme first began collaborating in 2009. Their approach to artwork has largely involved sampling both archival material and self-authored materials, in the mediums of sounds, images, text, objects, and performance; and then creating something new. Abbas and Abou-Rahme coined the term "archival multitude," and describe the act of archiving as a performance anyone could participate in.

Their work has been featured in exhibitions at the ICA Philadelphia, Portikus, The Palestinian Museum, Kunsthalle Wien, the Museum of Modern Art, Warsaw, and the ICA London. In 2009, Abbas and Abou-Rahme performed with the hip-hop trio Ramallah Underground, as the Ramallah Syndrome project which was featured in the Palestine Exhibition at the 53rd Venice Biennale. In 2013 they were also inaugural fellows at the Akademie der Kunst der Welt in Cologne, Germany. Abou-Rahme and Abbas exhibited their work Oh Shining Star Testify (2019/2022) at Hamburger Bahnhof as part of the 12th Berlin Biennale in 2022. They exhibited May amnesia never kiss us on the mouth (2022) at the Museum of Modern Art (MoMA) in New York City; which was part of an ongoing series started in 2020 about Palestinian loss, colonial violence, displacement, and forced migration.

They were award recipients of the Sharjah Biennale Prize (2015) and the Abraaj Prize (2016).

== Artwork series ==
- The Zone (2011–ongoing), created with 15 video screens, an installation, digital c-type prints, an online platform, and a publication
- The Incidental Insurgents (2012–ongoing)
- And yet my mask is powerful, Part I (2016)
- May amnesia never kiss us on the mouth (2020–ongoing)

== Publications ==
- Abbas, Basel; Abou-Rahme, Ruanne (2012). "The Zone: Desire and Disaster in the Contemporary Palestinian Landscape". Printed Matter (19).
- Abbas, Basel; Abou-Rahme, Ruanne (2013). "The archival multitude". Journal of Visual Culture. 12 (3): 345–363. doi:10.1177/1470412913502031 – via Sage Journals.
- <Abbas, Basel; Abou-Rahme, Ruanne (2014). "May amnesia never kiss us on the mouth". In Kholeif, Omar (ed.). You Are Here: Art After the Internet. Corner House. pp. 224–229.
- Abbas, Basel; Abou-Rahme, Ruanne (2021). "If Only This Mountain Between Us Could Be Ground". Theater. 51 (1): 46–51. doi:10.1215/01610775-8824771.

== See also ==
- List of Palestinian artists
