= Hazem Harb =

Palestinian artist (born 1980)

- حازم حرب
- Born: 1980 (age 44–45); Gaza City, Palestine
- Education: Accademia di Belle Arti di Roma, Istituto Europeo di Design (MFA)
- Occupations: Painter, photographer, collagist, installation artist

Hazem Harb (Arabic: حازم حرب, romanized: Ḥāzim Ḥarb; born 1980) is a Palestinian contemporary multidisciplinary visual artist, and photographer. Much of his work is collage, with the use of archival documents related to Palestinian history and culture. He was born in Gaza City, and has resided in Rome and Dubai.

== Life and career ==
Hazem Harb was born in 1980, in Gaza City, Palestine. He began drawing as a young child. His earliest art classes were at the Young Men's Christian Association (YMCA) in Gaza.

Harb moved to Italy in 2005. He attended the Accademia di Belle Arti di Roma (Academy of Fine Arts of Rome), and received a MFA degree in 2009 from the Istituto Europeo di Design in Rome.

Much of his work is characterized by its meticulous collaging, and his use of archival documents, ranging from artifacts from Palestine to personal family photos. His works are held in museum collections including at the British Museum, and the Durham University Oriental Museum.

== Exhibitions ==
=== Solo exhibitions ===
- Is This Your First Time In Gaza? (2010), solo exhibition, The Mosaic Rooms, Al Qattan Foundation, London, UK
- Power Does Not Defeat Memory (2019), solo exhibition, Sabsay Gallery, Copenhagen, Denmark
- Contemporary Heritage (2020), solo exhibition, Tabari Artspace, Dubai, UAE
- Gauze (2024), solo exhibition, Tabari Artspace, Dubai, UAE
- Not There, Yet Felt (2025), solo exhibition, Tabari Artspace, Dubai, UAE

=== Group exhibitions ===
- Between the Tides: A Gulf Quinquennial (2024), group exhibition, NYU Abu Dhabi, Abu Dhabi, UAE; curated by Maya Allison and Duygu Demir

== See also ==
- List of Palestinian artists
