= Simon Coates (artist) =

British artist

Simon Coates (born in Sheffield) is a British mixed media artist, writer and curator.

== About ==
Coates attended Plymouth College of Art, where he completed a course in Foundation Art. He went on to complete a degree in Fashion Design at Harrow College of Art, which became part of the University of Westminster in 1990.

In Dubai in September 2015 he launched the Middle East's only sound art club night – Tse Tse Fly Middle East – with Ram Nath. Tse Tse Fly Middle East now features an artist collective, and produces and curates exhibitions and live events. Coates manages all Tse Tse Fly Middle East's artistic directions. Since January 2015 he has produced a monthly two-hour radio programme for UK station Resonance EXTRA. The programme features sound art, noise and experimental music from the Middle East, Africa and the Indian subcontinent. He also produced a five part radio series named Tse Tse Fly Further East that featured the sound art scenes in the following South East Asian countries: Philippines (episode 1), Thailand (episode 2), Malaysia and Indonesia (episode 3), Vietnam and Loas (episode 4) and South Korea (episode 5).

Between October 2013 and May 2015 Coates was General Manager of the Dubai Community Theatre and Arts Centre (DUCTAC). During his time there Coates introduced an art commissioning programme, curated the UAE’s first-ever exhibition of sound art (Peace In An Open Space) and project-managed an exhibition of work by Turner Prize winner Jeremy Deller. He art-directed DUCTAC’s 2014/15 season that commissioned theatre performances from comedian Trevor Noah, the Chicago Shakespeare Company, Indian playwright and poet Gulzar, the Moscow City Ballet, the acclaimed Hindi version of Twelfth Night, Piya Behrupiya and more.

Coates has also worked under the pseudonym A Taxi For My Uncle and as one half of the Visqueen experiments-in-noise duo. He has been a contributing writer for Harper’s Bazaar Art Arabia and Contemporary Practices magazines, among others.

== Curated Exhibitions/Productions ==
- 2013 Peace In An Open Space, The Gallery of Light, Dubai, UAE
- 2013 Praxis – An Exhibition On Drawing, The Gallery of Light, Dubai, UAE
- 2013 Luma – Art In Film, The Gallery of Light, Dubai, UAE
- 2014 Jeremy Deller – English Magic, The Gallery of Light, Dubai, UAE
- 2014 Giorgio Moroder's Pyramid, The Gallery of Light, Dubai, UAE
- 2016 Tse Tse Fly Middle East at Quoz Arts Festival, Dubai, UAE
- 2016 Tse Tse Fly Middle East at Other Worlds Festival, UK
- 2016 Tse Tse Fly Middle East on Al Noor Island, Sharjah, UAE

== Selected exhibitions ==
- 2010 Off The Shelf Exhibition, Saltburn-By-The-Sea Gallery, York, UK
- 2010 Sleeping Runners, Brick Lane Gallery, London
- 2011 Artist In Residence, Gallery of Light, Dubai, UAE
- 2011 Recession, Work Progress Collective, New York, USA
- 2011 Artist In Residence, Sikka Art Fair, Dubai, UAE
- 2012 Billboard Art Project (9 x digital artworks), Albany, NY, USA
- 2012 Museum of Virulent Experience (2 x films), Conway Hall, London
- 2013 Bodied Spaces (1 x film collaboration with Sara Al Haddad), Art Claims Impulse Gallery, Berlin
- 2013 Noise & Whispers, GV Gallery, London
- 2013 The 01 Video Art Review Tour, various venues, Poland
- 2013 The Next Resistance (film collaboration with Sara Al Haddad) FIVAC Film Festival, Camaguey, Cuba
- 2013 Hybrid Identities (film collaboration with Sara Al Haddad). Edinburgh, UK
- 2014 PNEM Sound art Festival (as A Taxi For My Uncle), Uden, the Netherlands
- 2015 Safina Radio Project (as A Taxi For My Uncle), Dubai/Venice Biennale
- 2015 Radiophrenia (as A Taxi For My Uncle), Glasgow, UK
- 2016 Paratissima 2016 Art Fair, Turin, Italy
- 2016 Radiophrenia, Glasgow, UK
- 2016 Artist Film Festival, Bomb Factory Art Foundation, London, UK
- 2016 Dronestruck sound art exhibition, Hamline University, Minnesota, USA
- 2016 Cairotronica Festival, Cairo, Egypt
- 2016 Audioblast Festival, Nantes, France
- 2016 The Listening Booth project (as A Taxi For My Uncle), London, UK
- 2017 The Sound of Memory, Whitechapel Gallery, London, UK
