= Sama Alshaibi =

Iraqi-born American artist

Sama Raena Alshaibi
- سما الشيبي
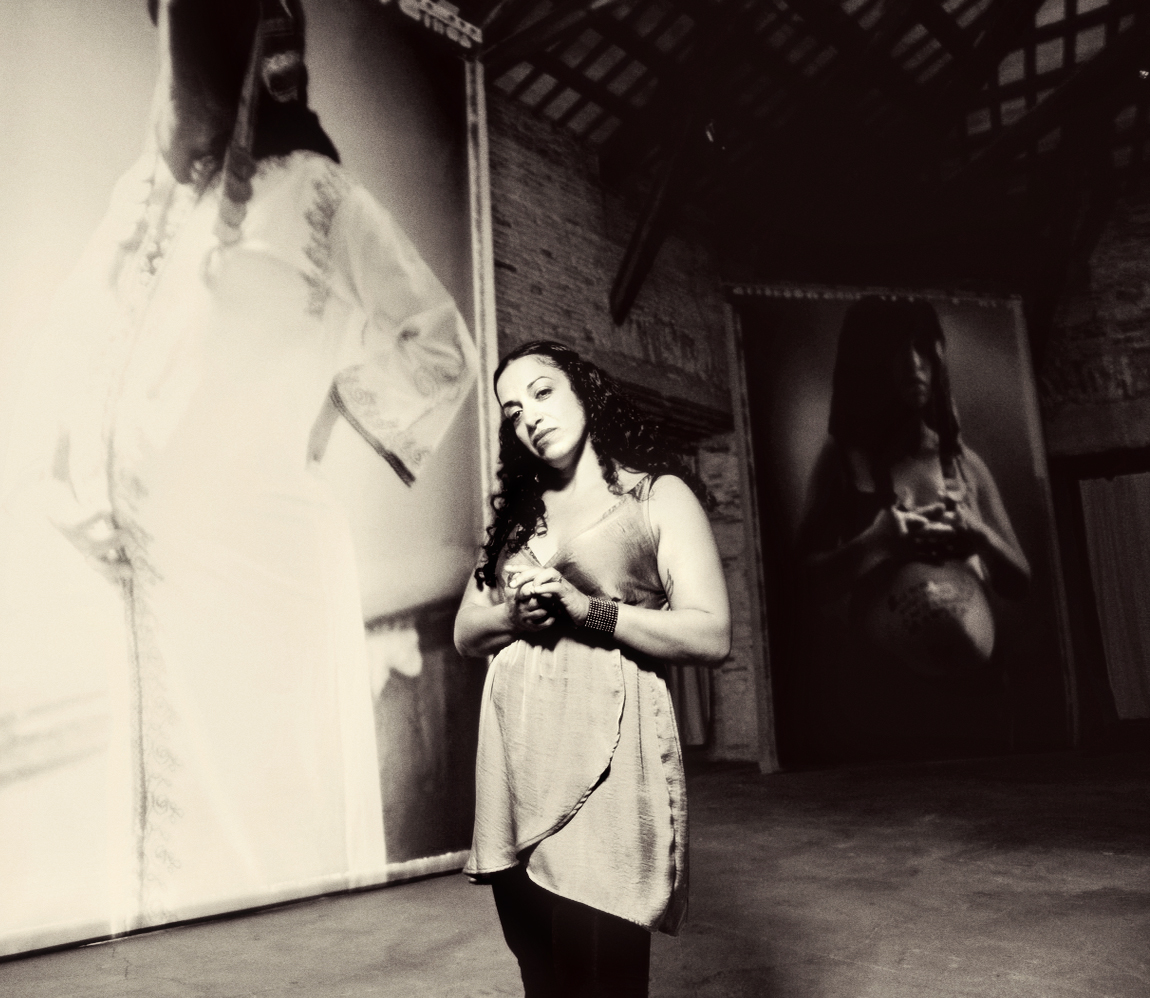
- Sama Alshaibi at her exhibition, The Arab Body, Italy, c. 2010
- Born: 1973 (age 52–53); Basra, Ba'athist Iraq
- Education: Columbia College, Chicago (photojournalism); University of Colorado Boulder (photography, video and media arts)
- Known for: Photography, video art and installation art
- Website: samaalshaibil.com

Sama Raena Alshaibi also known as Sama Alshaibi (Arabic: سما الشيبي born 1973 in Basra, Iraq) is an Iraqi–Palestinian conceptual artist (video art, performative photography, sculpture and installation), who deals with spaces of conflict as her primary subject. War, exile, power and the quest for survival are themes seen in her works. She often uses her own body in her artwork as a representation of the country or an issue she is dealing with.

Sama Alshaibi was named a 2021 Guggenheim Fellow in Photography. She has exhibited extensively throughout the Americas, Europe, the Middle East and North Africa since 2003. She has held solo exhibitions in New York, London, Dubai, Guatemala City, Jerusalem, Ramallah and Arizona. Her project Silsila was exhibited at the 55th Venice Biennale (2013), as part of the Maldives Pavilion. In 2019, she was selected as an artist in residence at Artpace San Antonio that culminated with a solo exhibition titled “Until Total Liberation.” She also represented the United States at the 13th International Cairo Biennale in 2019. Her video work Wasl (Arabic for "Union" – 2017) was included in the inaugural 2017 Honolulu Biennial. She has been selected as one of 60 artists for the State of the Art 2020 (Crystal Bridges, Arkansas) curated by Lauren Haynes.

== Life and career ==
Alshaibi was born in Basra in 1973 to an Iraqi father and a Palestinian mother. She moved to the United States with her family in 1986.

Alshaibi's mother, Maha Yaqoubi was born in Jaffa in 1946. The Yaqoubi family were relocated to Iraq around 1949, as a result of the 1948 Palestinian expulsion and flight. The family settled in Baghdad and where the artist's mother married Alshaibi's Iraqi father, Hameed, in 1968. Sama Alshaibi and her siblings, including Usama Alshaibi, and parents fled Basra, Iraq in 1981, during the Iraq-Iran War. They lived in Saudi Arabia, United Arab Emirates and Jordan before moving the United States in 1986. Her story of leaving Iraq is told in her films Goodbye to the Weapon and Where The Birds Fly.

She was raised in the Middle East and United States of America and attended high school at Iowa City High School, in Iowa City, Iowa.

Alshaibi was taught photography by her father when she was 12 years old. She received her formal art education by initially studying photography at Columbia College Chicago with a major in photojournalism, obtaining a BA in Photography; and later obtained a Master of Fine Arts (Photography, Video and New Media) at University of Colorado Boulder in 2005.

Her first ambition was to become a war photographer. In an interview, Sand Rushes in, Alshaibi credits her mentor John H. White (an African American, and Pulitzer Prize winning photojournalist for the Chicago Sun Times) for recognizing that she was a conceptual artist, even though her concerns were political in nature. She remained in the photojournalism track, but her early work showed the beginnings of what she eventually would become known for in her future practice, including her body staged as various characters.

In graduate school, Alshaibi was primarily mentored by noted Jamaican artist Albert Chong. In interviews, Alshaibi states that living in a war and later as a refugee are the driving influences of her artwork, but she also notes the particular impact that black photographers working with issues of identity and representation have had on her. Besides her two mentors, Chong and White, Alshaibi was also inspired by artists Carrie Mae Weems and Lorna Simpson when she was introduced to their work while at Columbia College.

In the first semester of graduate school, Alshaibi's university museum held an exhibition titled "Shatat: Arab Diaspora Women Artists"; Alshaibi credits this exhibition for giving her the vocabulary to contextualize her work as well as introducing her to the artists and curators, especially Dr. Salah Hassan, having a major impact on her future studies. Alshaibi finished her first year of graduate school with her first solo exhibition at La Fabrica in Guatemala City, after meeting artist Luis Gonzalez Palma at her school. He was a Visiting Artist and Alshaibi had a critique with him. He asked her for a CD of her images to take to his gallery in Guatemala. One month later, La Fabrica contacted her and she continued showing with them for several years.

Alshaibi is a Full Professor of Photography at the University of Arizona. and holds the title of ‘1885 Society Distinguished Scholar’. She served as an elected member of the National Board of Directors for Society For Photographic Education (2009–2013). She was the co-founder of the feminist collective 6+ before leaving in 2009. Alshaibi represented the United States of America as the U.S. Department of State Arts Envoy to the UAE from May 21–30, 2012.

== Monograph ==
Sama Alshaibi: Sand Rushes In, the first monograph of Sama Alshaibi, published by Aperture Foundation. It presents work from Silsila, a video and photographic project that Alshaibi worked on over five years in the deserts and threatened water sources of North Africa and West Asia. Part of that project premiered at the 2013 Venice Biennale. The book also presents other series including Thowra, Negatives Capable Hands and The Pessimists in the context of Silsila which means 'chain' or 'link' in Arabic. Alshaibi's book was published as part of the Aperture's First Book program, and she is the first artist from the Middle East to have a monograph published by Aperture."

== Awards ==
- 2021 "Guggenheim Fellowship", The John Simon Guggenheim Memorial Foundation.
- 2019 The Center Awards: Project Development Grant Winner, The Center at Santa Fe
- 2018 Artist Research and Development Grant – Arizona Commission on the Arts
- 2017 Visual Arts AFAC Grant - Arab Fund for Arts and Culture: for the project proposal "Carry Over" (photography, sculpture)
- 2014–2015 Fulbright Scholars Fellowship to the West Bank/Palestine: Alshaibi was awarded the prestigious Fulbright Scholars Fellowship and relocated to Ramallah with her family for one year. Her proposal was titled: Arts, Culture and Community Building: Developing Educational Programming for the Palestinian Museum.
- 2013 University of Arizona's 1885 Society Distinguished Scholars Award: Alshaibi was one of four recipients of the UA's 1885 Society Distinguished Scholars Award and title, supported through the UA Foundation's 1885 Society and sponsored by the UA Office of the President. The award recognizes outstanding mid-career faculty who are leading experts in their fields and highly valued contributors to the UA's teaching, research and outreach missions. The Regents' and Distinguished Professors who reviewed the nominations noted that [she is] "clearly one of the most important voices today in producing art pertaining to issues of the Middle East, women, the body, Islam and exile."
- 2010 Faculty Research Development Grant, University of Arizona
- 2008 Crystal Apple Faculty Recipient, Society for Photography Education – juried national teaching award
- 2008 Excellence in Photographic Teaching, The Center (at Santa Fe) – Honorable Mention – juried national teaching award
- 2007 Feminist Review Trust, London, United Kingdom

== Art projects ==
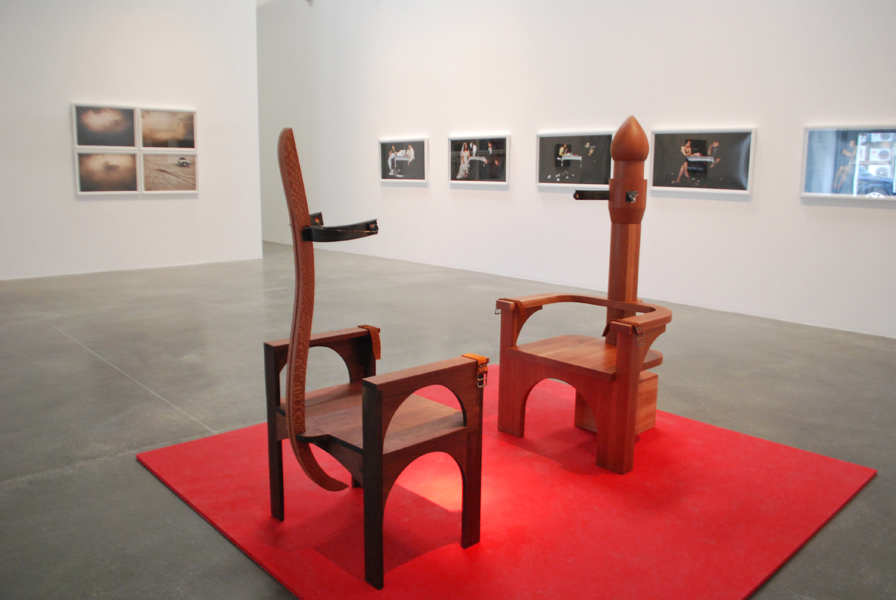
1 vs ruler installation view 2

- Adjudicating the Jezebel, 2020, mixed media
- The Cessation, 2019, installation
- Carry Over, 2019, photography
- Silsila, 2009–2017, video art, photography and installation
- The Tethered, 2012, video art
- Flight, 2012, video art
- vs Him, 2011 (solo exhibition in Dubai vs. Him multi media including
- vs. The Empire from vs. Him, 2011, projection on canvas with sound
- vs. The Ruler from vs. Him, 2011, wood throne sculptures and sound
- vs. The Father from vs. Him, 2011, video art
- vs. The Brother from vs. Him, 2011, video art
- vs. The Son from vs. Him, 2011, video art
- Thowra (Revolution), 2011 video art
- Warhead, photography, 2010
- Negative's Capable Hands, photography 2010
- Baghdadi Mem/Wars, video art in collaboration with Dena Al-Adeeb, 2010, includes three videos: Absence/Presence, Efface/Remain, and Still/Chaos
- End of September, 2010, 16 minutes, dramatic narrative short, co-written and directed with Ala' Younis.
- Chicken, 2009, experimental video art
- Sissy, 2010, experimental video art
- Sweep, 2009 experimental video art
- The Rivers, 2009, 58 minutes, documentary about Iraqi Refugees in Jordan
- The Bride Wears Orange (2009-video)
- Between Two Rivers (2008-photography)
- And Other Interruptions (2007–2008, photography)
- All I Want For Christmas (2007-video)
- In This Garden (Photography 2006)
- Birthright (2005-photography)
- Where the Birds Fly (2008-video)
- Zaman: I Remember (2002–2004)

== See also ==
- Iraqi art
- List of Iraqi artists
- List of Iraqi women artists
- List of Palestinian women artists
