= Rula Halawani =

Palestinian photographer and educator (born 1964)

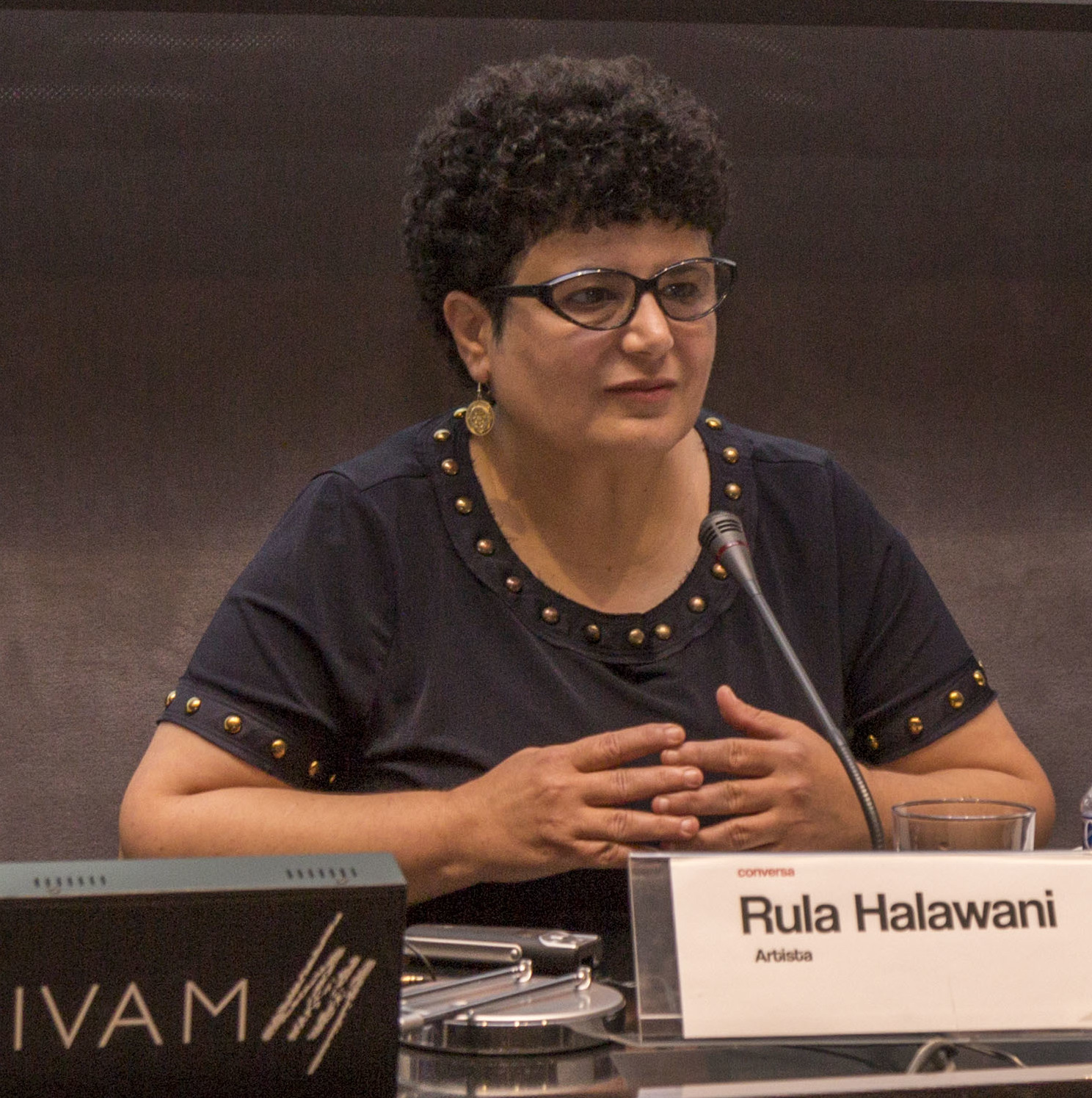
Rula Halawani in the IVAM, Valencia 2017.

Rula Halawani (born 1964) is a Palestinian photographer and educator who lives and works in Jerusalem.

== Early life and education ==
She was born in East Jerusalem and received a BA in photography from the University of Saskatchewan and an MA in photographic studies from the University of Westminster.

== Life and work ==
Before turning to visual arts, she worked as a freelance photojournalist for a number of magazines and newspapers.

Halawani's photography is focused on Palestinian life and the political conflicts of the area. Emmanuel d’Autreppe, writing for AWARE Women Artist, suggest Halawani's "first works reflect the weight of everyday life and the inequity of restrictions as well as the state of siege, its large-scale consequences and its media coverage, both local and international." She documents experiences of Palestinians with checkpoints and X-ray scanning machines through projects such as The Wall (2005) and The Bride is Beautiful, But She is Married to Another Man (2016). Halawani experiments with infrared filters and X-ray technology in her works to create effects of distortion.

Her work has appeared in exhibitions in London, in Dubai, in Beirut, at Darat al Funun - The Khalid Shoman Foundation in Amman, at the Sharjah Biennial, at the National Museum of Women in the Arts, at the Noorderlicht festival, in Rome, at Le Botanique in Brussels, at the Busan Biennale in South Korea and at the Arab World Institute in Paris. In 2016, she was given a residency fellowship at the Camargo Foundation, in Cassis.

Halawani is director of the photography department at Birzeit University.

== Collections ==
Halawani's work is held in the following permanent collections:

- Centre Georges Pompidou, Paris
- Victoria and Albert Museum, London
- British Museum, London
- Museum of Fine Arts, Houston
- Darat al Funun - The Khalid Shoman Foundation, Amman
- Nadour Collection, Germany
