= Zulfa al-Sa'di =

Palestinian painter (1905–1988)

Zulfa al-Sa'di زلفى السعدي
- Born: 1905; Jerusalem
- Died: 1988 (aged 82–83); Syria
- Occupation: Visual artist

Zulfa al-Sa'di (1905 – 1988) was a Palestinian visual artist, known for her paintings. She also went by the name Zulfa Al Saadi.

== Biography ==
Zulfa al-Sa'di was born in Jerusalem to a family of Sufis. She was a student of Nicolas Sayegh (1863–1942) from whom she must have learned how to use photographs that chronicled historical events or publicised political figures to develop her paintings. In particular, al-Sa'di was interested in an allegorical use that emphasized symbolic meanings about national Palestinian identity.

In 1933, at age 23, she participated in The Arab Exhibition in Mandate Jerusalem. There, she exhibited portraits of eminent men in the Arab world of her time, including Sharif Husayn, King Faysal I of Iraq, and Egyptian poet Ahmad Shawqi.

In 1938, she married Saif al-Din al-Dajani and lived and worked in Jerusalem until the 1948 Nakba, when she was forced to move to Damascus, Syria, where she taught art to Palestinian refugee children in schools affiliated with the United Nations Relief and Works Agency.

== Artistic production ==
Al-Sa'di is best known for her paintings of prominent historical and literary figures such as Salah al-Din al-Ayyubi, Jamal al-Din al-Afghani, Omar al-Mukhtar, and the poet Ahmed Shawqi, and she focused on the use of metaphors that emphasize symbolic meanings about Palestinian identity in her paintings.

In 1933, at the age of 23, she participated in the first Arab National Exhibition organized by the Islamic Council in Jerusalem in 1932, where she exhibited several paintings representing a number of prominent people in the Arab world, such as Sharif Hussein, King Faisal I of Iraq, and the Egyptian poet Ahmed Shawqi.

== Death ==
Al-Sa'di died in Syria in 1988 at the age of eighty-three.
