= Iman Al Sayed =

Palestinian artist (born 1984)

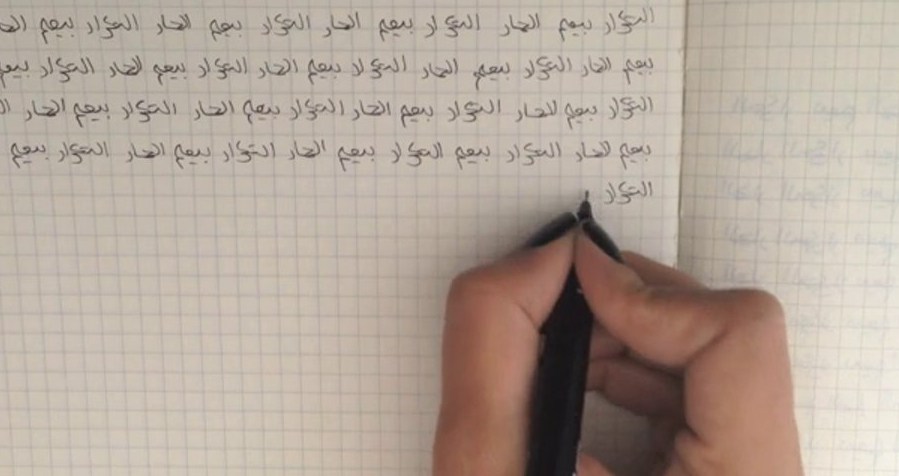
Re-Repeat by Iman Al Sayed

Iman Al Sayed (Arabic: إيمان السيد, born 1984), is a Palestinian artist whose work focuses on processes and repetition. She probes and investigates the human condition and the sociopolitical effects caused by displacement. Al Sayed uses various media in her work, varying from sculptures and installations to moving images, sound and words.

== Background ==
Al Sayed graduated with a master's degree in Fine Art at the Utrecht Graduate School of Visual Art and Design, HKU University of the Arts and holds a BFA from College of Fine Arts in Sharjah in Sculpture. She continued studying human rights, museology, VJing and metaphysics at a later stage. She participated in exhibitions and residencies in different countries and gave sculpture and printmaking workshops in the UAE. Al Sayed works on writings and research about the art and political scene in the Arab world in general and on documentation and histories in specific. She continues to collaborate with artists and curators, working on multidisciplinary projects.

== Exhibitions ==
- Prospects: Before You Ask Me To Stay, HKU, Utrecht (2015)
- Research Pavilion, Venice Biennale, Venice (2015)
- Boiler Room, Academia Gallery, Utrecht (2014)
- Suspended Accounts, Qattan Foundation, Ramallah (2014)
- A Funny Kind of Exhibition, Cartoon Art Gallery, Dubai (2013)
- Hunger, DUCTAC, Dubai (2013)
- The Big Picture, DUCTAC, Dubai (2013)
- VJ Festival, Istanbul (2011)
- In Situ, Jam Jar, Dubai (2009)
- Space-tacular, Volume Foundation, Rome (2008)
- a strong sense of the fabrication of things, Riwak, Sharjah (2008)
- Progressive Movement, Meadows, Dubai (2007)
- Minus Reality, Art Attack Gallery, Dubai (2007)
- Al Hakeeba, Alexandria Atelier, Alexandria (2007)
- Exit, Sharjah Art Museum, Sharjah (2006)
