= Mohamed Dalo =

Palestinian artist

Mohamed Dalou (in Arabic : محمد الدلو; born 1994) is a Palestinian artist who was born in Gaza Strip. Dalo has Duchenne muscular dystrophy. Dalo was the first Palestinian to open an anime exhibition.
