= Heba Zagout =

Palestinian artist and teacher (1984–2023)

- هبة زقوت
- Born: 14 February 1984; Bureij, Palestine
- Died: 13 October 2023 (aged 39); Bureij, Palestine
- Cause of death: Israeli airstrike
- Education: Al-Aqsa University
- Occupations: Artist, teacher
- Known for: Landscape art

Heba Zagout (Arabic: هبة زقوت; 14 February 1984 – 13 October 2023) was a Palestinian artist and schoolteacher who painted landscapes and cityscapes of Gaza and Jerusalem. She was killed by an Israeli airstrike early in the Gaza war.

== Early life and education ==
Heba Zagout was born on 14 February 1984 in Bureij, a refugee camp in the Gaza Strip. Her family was said to have came from the village of Isdud. Gaza Training College awarded Zagout a diploma in graphic design in 2003. Zagout then attended Al-Aqsa University in Gaza where she studied fine art and graduated in 2007.

== Career ==
Zagout worked for the United Nations Relief and Works Agency for Palestine Refugees and was a school teacher. The Art Newspaper described Zagout's art as "steeped in Palestinian culture and folklore" and using bright colours. Common themes in her paintings included landscapes, cityscapes, and the people of Gaza and Jerusalem, and she often included symbols of Palestinian identity in her work and the Al-Aqsa Mosque. She viewed her art as a way to communicate and said "I consider art a message that I deliver to the outside world through my expression of the Palestinian cause and Palestinian identity". Her last solo exhibition was focused on depicting her family during the COVID-19 pandemic, titled "My Children in Quarantine," was held at the Dar Qandeel for Arts and Culture in Tulkarem in 2021.

Zagout and two of her children, Adam and Mahmoud, were killed on 13 October by an Israeli airstrike on her home in Bureij; many of her artworks were also destroyed in the strike.

== Personal life ==
Zagout's family lived in Isdud until they were expelled in 1948 during the Nakba. She had an older sister and a younger brother. Zagout was married and had four children, two of whom were killed in the same airstrike in Gaza that killed Zagout.

== Legacy ==
The arts collective Museummuseum organised a pop-up exhibition in New York City to display prints of Zagout's work in late 2023. The event raised more than $1,400 for Zagout's surviving family and her work has appeared in subsequent exhibitions organised by Museummuseum. In early 2024, murals based on designs by Palestinian artists, including Zagout, were created in Belfast. Two of Zagout's works bought by Chris Whitman were part of an exhibition in The Palestinian Museum titled "This is Not an Exhibition" which showcased 300 pieces of art by Palestinian artists.
