= Alexandra Handal =

Palestinian artist, filmmaker and essayist (b. 1975)

Alexandra Sophia Handal (born 1975) is a Palestinian artist, filmmaker and essayist. Handal has been Based in Europe since 2004, but spends extended periods of time in Palestine. After living for ten years in London, Handal moved for a time to Amsterdam, the Netherlands, before residing in Berlin, Germany with her family, where she has established her studio.

== Biography ==
Due to her family's displacement from Palestine, Handal has spent time in many countries. Her family is Bethlehemite from Palestine. She was born in Port-au-Prince, Haiti in 1975 during the dictatorship of Jean-Claude Duvalier. Her family eventually moved to the Santo Domingo, Dominican Republic, where Handal spent her teenage years.

She went on to pursue art at Boston University, where she obtained a BFA in painting and minor in art history in 1997; followed by an MA degree in studio art from New York University in 2001. In 2004, Handal was granted a UAL Research Studentship Award to undertake a practice/theory PhD at Chelsea College of Arts in London, graduating in 2011. During her postgraduate studies, she was member of the research centre: TrAIN (Transnational Art, Identity and Nation).

== Art work ==
Handal had her first solo museum exhibition, Memory Flows Like the Tide at Dusk at the Museet for Samtidskunst, Roskilde, Denmark (September–December 2016). She showed new works alongside existing ones, drawing together her works focused on collective loss. In 2007, she began conducting oral historical fieldwork with Palestinian refugees and exiles from West Jerusalem.

In this exhibition, Handal described displacement as "a constant in [her] family" over three generations. Over time, she went from feeling like a perpetual outsider wherever she went to feeling that lacking a sense of belonging to any one country allows her to feel connected to many of them, perceiving them with both the insight of a resident and the objectivity of an outsider. She has come to identify with the term "outsider," but also to recognize the concept of insiders and outsiders as a manifestation of power structures. She says that this understanding allowed her to "access a new cultural terrain that includes all of me."

Among the works on exhibit at the museum was her ongoing mammoth project, Dream Homes Property Consultants (DHPC). It displays listings of "Arab-style houses" from which Palestinians were displaced in 1948. Each listing has biographical information about the family that once lived there a long with other animations and artifacts. This interactive web documentary art’ has been in the making since 2007. It was an Official Selection at IDFA DocLab (2013), where it had its international premiere. It was included in a number of festivals such as UXdoc Rencontres internationales du documentaire de Montreal (2014), Przemiany Interdisciplinary Festival at the Copernicus Science Center, Warsaw, Picturing Palestine: Film Screening and Panel Discussion at Modern Art Oxford for Israeli Apartheid Week (2015) and After the Last Sky Festival in Berlin (2016). Dream Homes Property Consultants (DHPC) won the 2014 Lumen People's Choice Gold Award (UK), 2015 Second Prize for the Freedom Flowers Foundation Award (Switzerland) and it was Shortlisted for the 2013 Artraker Award (UK). DHPC was noted as being the ‘first independently produced interactive web documentary by an artist-filmmaker from the MENA region’. Since 2014, DHPC has been among the 20 most viewed web documentaries on the MIT Open Documentary Lab, which is a database exploring the impact of technology on documentary.

Another work that was part of Handal's solo exhibition was her experimental short, From the Bed & Breakfast Notebooks. It was selected for New Contemporaries 2009 – an open submission juried exhibition that takes place annually since 1949 and showcases the works of emerging talents from British art schools. Studio International Magazine called her film a 'quietly powerful political engagement', while the Chair of Bloomberg New Contemporaries, Sasha Craddock described it as ‘poetic and gentle’. Handal was mentioned in The Guardian among the 'few names to watch'. The selectors for 2009 consisted of: John Stezaker, Ellen Gallagher, Saskia Olde Wolbers and Wolfgang Tillmans.

== Publications and conferences ==
Handal has presented papers at a number of conferences where art intersects with other fields, discussing themes of memory, history, power, knowledge and geographical imagination in her work. She participated in the Art and Geographical Knowledge at the Royal Geographical Society with IBG, Annual International Conference, Manchester, UK (2009), the [Record] [Create]: Oral History in Art, Craft, and Design at the Oral History Society Annual Conference in association with the Victoria and Albert Museum London (2010) and the Art and Resistance Conference organised by Dar al-Kalima University, Bethlehem, Palestine (2016). Handal contributed an essay "Chronicle from the Field" for the book, Oral History in the Visual Arts.
