= Ibrahim Hazimeh =

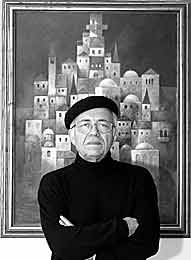
- Born: April 24, 1933; Akka, Mandatory Palestine
- Died: September 25, 2023; Berlin, Germany
- Education: Hochschule für Grafik und Buchkunst
- Occupation: Visual artist
- Known for: Painting, sculpture, designer

Ibrahim Hazimeh (24 April 1933 – 25 September 2023) was a Palestinian-born visual artist, designer, and educator. He was known for painting and sculpture. In his early life he was a refugee and lived in Lebanon and Syria.

== Career ==
In 1948, Hazimeh and his family suffered expulsion from Mandatory Palestine and they fled by boat to Latakia, Syria as refugees. In Latakia, he initially worked on the docks to support his family, before eventually becoming an art teacher and a bookkeeper. Hazimeh completed a correspondence course with the Ecole de Dessin in Paris.

In 1960, Hazimeh was awarded a scholarship to study at the Hochschule für Grafik und Buchkunst (Academy of Visual Arts) in Leipzig, Germany. In 1964, he graduated with distinction, with professor Bernhard Heisig as his mentor.

Since 1974, he has lived in Berlin. He is the President of the Palestinian National Committee at the AIAP / UNESCO as well as a board member and spokesperson of the Palestinian Artists Association in Europe.

In 2007, he designed the United Buddy Bear for Palestine, which has been presented at the exhibitions 2007 in Cairo, Jerusalem and 2008 in Warsaw, Stuttgart and Pyongyang so far. 2014 in Rio de Janeiro. 142 of these United Buddy Bears (each 2 m tall) stand together hand in hand in harmony - representing 142 countries acknowledged by the United Nations. Each Bear has been designed individually by an artist on behalf of his or her native country.

== Visual language ==
Hazimeh painted rural scenes, in an autumnal palette, with recurring figures of Palestinian peasant women carrying baskets on their heads.

== Awards ==
- 1957, Cairo Salon Prize
- 1958, Fall Exhibition Prize in [Damascus]
