= Nasr Abdel Aziz Eleyan =

Nasr Abdel Aziz Eleyan (born 1941; Arabic: نصر عبد العزيز ) is a Palestinian-born painter, professor, television production designer, and television producer. He lives in Amman, Jordan, where he teaches fine arts at the University of Jordan.

== Early life and education ==
He was born in the former village of az-Zakariyya, north of Hebron in the Mandatory Palestine. The town was captured by Israeli forces in 1948. He grew up in the Palestinian refugee camp of Ein as-Sultan near Jericho, where he began painting as a child. He studied fine arts and film in Moscow, Baghdad, Cairo and London.

His daughter is film director Hanadi Elyan.

== Style ==
Nasr is a figurative painter whose individual style is concerned with cultural traditions. His paintings depict the rural life of Palestinian farmers and the traditional Palestinian way of life. He simplifies his subjects with simple geometrical lines, creating both harmony and balance. Most of his paintings are oil on canvas. He did some water colors especially as supportive illustrations to one of his television productions. He has had several exhibitions in Amman, Jordan and abroad. His last participation was Orfali Art Gallery in Amman on 26 July 2007.

== Film and television career ==
Nasr worked in Jordan Television and then moved to Dubai. He worked as an interior designer for drama production and headed Dubai TV's design department for at least 20 years. He also headed the Production Center created by Dubai TV. During that period he received a Masters of Arts degree in visual arts from Egypt – specializing him as a screen play writer and producer. He produced several programs and serials. He also wrote a research about Arab Media for the United Arab Emirates University at Al Ain.

He produced an informative television series entitled Costumes Through the Ages. That took a substantial amount of research and a little over a hundred water color paintings used as illustrations.

== See also ==
- Ethnic cleansing of Circassians
