= Raeda Saadeh =

Palestinian artist (born 1977)

Raeda Saadeh رائدة سعادة
- Born: 1977 (age 48–49); Umm al-Fahm, Israel
- Education: School of Visual Arts
- Alma mater: Bezalel Academy of Arts and Design

Raeda Saadeh (Arabic: رائدة سعادة; born 1977) is a Palestinian artist. She won the 2000 "The Young Artist of the Year Award," by the A. M. Qattan Foundation.

== Life ==
She was born in Umm al-Fahm, a Palestinian-populated city in the North of Israel. She received her BFA and MFA from the Bezalel Academy of Arts and Design, Jerusalem. She studied at the School of Visual Arts.

She lives and works in Jerusalem.

== Work ==
Saadeh works in photographs, installations, and performances. In 2012, a monograph of Saadeh's work, Raeda Saadeh: Reframing Palestine was published edited by Rose Issa. Abu Hatoum Narouz, writing for American Quarterly, argues that " Saadeh's work not only subverts the hegemonic visual dominance of the Israeli state but offers a context for thinking through visual liberation and sovereignty."

Her work is in the collection of the Victoria and Albert Museum, Fonds régional d'art contemporain de Lorraine, and Le Magasin.

== Exhibitions ==
- 2007 "Vacuum" screened in Sharjah Biennial 8
- 2005 "Sharjah Art Museum" ART COLOGNE, Germany
- 2005 "Mediterranean Encounters," Castello Ruffo, Scilla-Italy
- 2004 "Mediterraneans," Macro Museo D'Arte Contemporanea, Rome, Italy
- 2004 Bezalel Academy of Arts and Design Final Show, Tel Aviv
- 2004 Unscene, University of Greenwich, London, UK
