= Ibrahim Ghannam =

Palestinian artist (1930–1984)

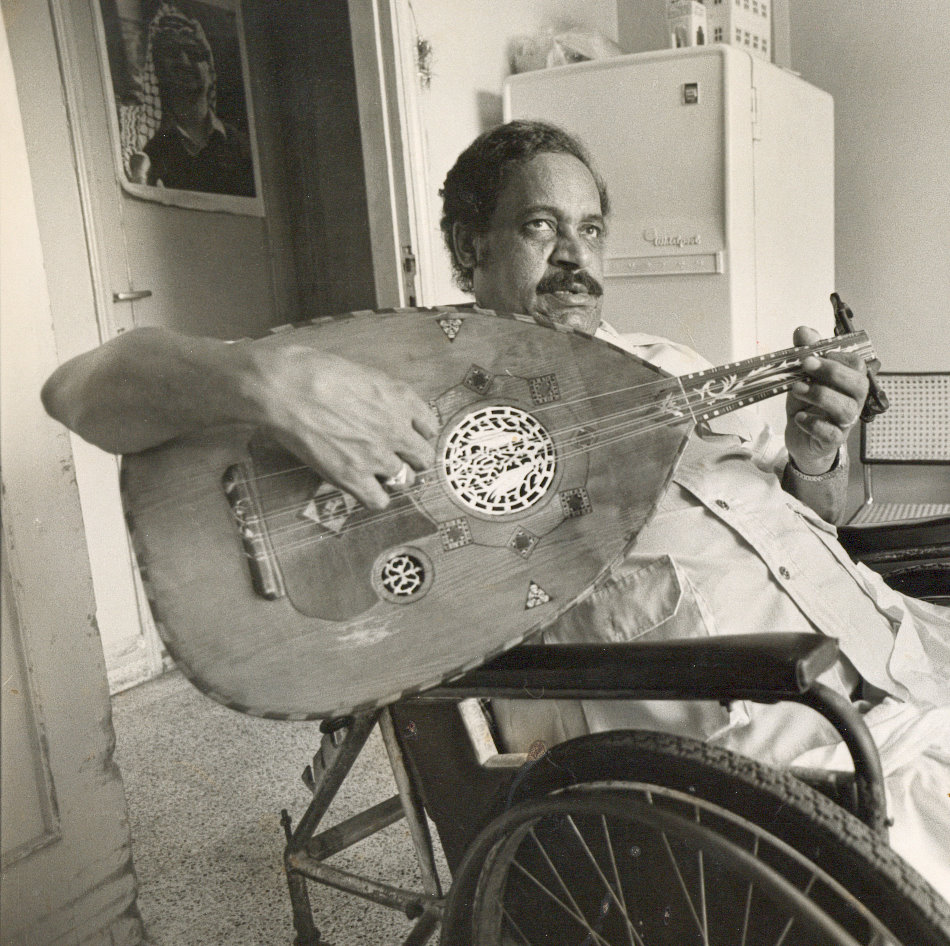
- Ibrahim Ghannam
- Born: Ibrahim Hassan Kheite; 1930; Haifa, Palestine
- Died: 1984 (aged 53–54); Beirut, Lebanon
- Known for: Painting
- Movement: Plastic art

Ibrahim Hassan Kheite (1930–1984), also known as Ibrahim Ghannam, was a Palestinian visual artist and painter. He was born in the coastal town of Yajur near Haifa in Palestine and later resided in Tal Al-Za'atar refugee camp, located north of Beirut in Lebanon.

== Biography ==
Ghannam suffered from gout since childhood, which led him to rely on a wheelchair for mobility throughout his life. Despite his physical challenges, he persevered in his passion for painting, thanks to a UNRWA nurse who provided him with painting materials. Ghannam depicted scenes of village life in Yajur, in a naïve style using bright colours and a meticulousness approach to detail reminiscent of the Islamic miniaturists. Ghannam chose to paint evocative village life, a far cry from his room overlooking an open sewer and his subsistence diet of canned foods. By transcending his harsh reality to capture vibrant rural scenes, he was able to preserve the visual memory of bountiful Palestinian countryside for a generation of children born in the refugee camp. In addition to this visionary approach to his own work, Ghannam was also one of the founding members of the General Union of Palestinian Artists and the General Federation of Arab Artists.

Ghannam is the subject of Adnan Mdanat's 1977 documentary film, Palestinian Visions. He said in an interview, "I feel that my life stopped at the age of 17, because that is how old I was when I left, and I only live when I dream of those days." Ghannam also found solace in playing the oud (as pictured here).

== Exhibitions ==
- 2020, The Naïve Arab Artist: Naïfs, Outsiders, L’art Autre, and L’art Brut in the Middle East, American University of Beirut Art Galleries, Beirut, Lebanon

== See also ==
- Palestinian art
- Palestinians
- Palestine
- UNWRA
- 1948 Palestinian expulsion and flight
