= Zohdy Qadry =

Palestinian painter (born 1972)

Zohdy Qadry (Arabic: زهدي قدري; born in 1972) is a Palestinian painter. His work is abstract, and thematically linked to Palestinian history.

== Biography ==
Zohdy Qadry was born in 1972 in Nahf, in the Western Galilee. He studied at Saint Petersburg Art and Industry Academy (now Saint Petersburg Stieglitz State Academy of Art and Design) in St. Petersburg, Russia in the 1990s, where he also completed a master's degree in wall paintings. He worked in St. Petersburg for several years and returned home in 2004.

Qadry's work relates directly to Palestinian history and he is considered as a plastic artist who brings Palestinians' socio-historical issues into the art field, via modern and simple painting.

The infrastructure of Qadry's plastic art was made by pairing the Palestinian experience with the Russian art legacy as practiced at the Mochina institute. Qadry's work has far-reaching contexts – a result of his life path and his time in Russia – and combines a Palestinian-Russian modern style of art.

=== Non-geometric themes ===
The main theme in Qadry's work between 1996 and 2003 was that of "Home". In the painting, Nahf (1999), the scene overlooks the houses of Nahf from outside of village in a distance on a foothill, we see small houses and the mosque's minaret which seems representation of nostalgia.

Qadry painted a series of olive trees between 2002 and 2003. In this series, he moves from representing one tree to a number of trees and adopted three-dimensional technique in this series with the shape of a square grid. Looking over time at his painting – from The Family (2002) to Something inside You (2011) – one can see a transition from the figurative style to the abstract.

=== Geometric theme ===
In recent years Qadry took geometric shapes as his artistic language. This works does not represent reality but rather to present to the logic of formation, materially and formally.

This body of work proposes aesthetic questions about how the principle of plastic art production works in the colonial Palestinian context, and how does art acquires socio-historical meaning in general.

In the "Memory of Immigration (2012) exhibition, which based on the Idea that visualization of Palestinian tragedy or Al-Nakba, Qadry included some geometric painting series.

Qadry participated in a group exhibition, "Take Painting" at the Petach Tikva Museum of Art, the paintings in which were characterized as "not romantic representations of ruins observed somewhere out there in the landscape; they are themselves ruins—composite sites of the real and the allegorical, hybrid accumulations of abstract and figurative idioms". Some viewed Qadry's work as modernist formalism with a hidden political essence that blocks any connection to the real world and presents the viewer with a closed world. Others critiqued the way Qadry's works hangs in main space of the gallery and connects the paintings hanging on it to one unit and this formation "form connected with the history of painting to ideas of disrupting the present order, but here, the diagonal plaster wall does not disturb order but rather sets it up."

Qadryhimself declared when he released "Non-Subject" series: "As a painter, I strive to formulate numerous questions – and answers – as part of the format of painting, rather than cling to artistic or social laws and values intended to dominate me and dictate my fate." However, by his works it seems able to express Palestinian's socio-historical tragedy through visualization via its technique, material and in an abstract geometrical language.

== Solo exhibitions ==
- 2009–2014, Tova Osman Art Gallery, Tel Aviv
- 2009, Beit HaGefen, Haifa
- 2009, The Russian Cultural Center, Tel Aviv
- 2005, Parry Gallery, St. Petersburg

== Group exhibitions ==
- 2016, "Take Painting", Petah Tikva Museum of Contemporary Art, Petah Tikva
- 2016, "Geometric Melody", N & N Aman Gallery, Tel Aviv-Yafo
- 2013, "The Mediterranean Biennale", Sakhneen
- 2012, " Memory of Immigration", Art Gallery, Umel-Fahem
- 2011, " Ceramic Biennale", Art Gallery, Umel-Fahem
- 2009, "Mahmoud Darwish", Al-Ma-hatta, Ramallah
- 2008, "Correspondence", L.A. Mayer Museum of Islamic Art, Jerusalem
- 2005, "In Living Colour", Dubai
- 2003, "From the Avant-garde to the Present Day", The Union of Saint Petersburg Artists
- 2001, "Fall Exhibition", The Union of Saint Petersburg Artists
