= Ahlam Shibli =

Palestinian photographer from Israel (born 1970)

- أحلام شبلي
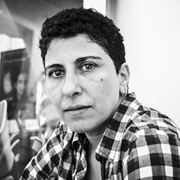
- Ahlam Shibli (2013) at the Jeu de Paume
- Born: 1970 (age 55–56); Shibli-Umm al-Ghanam, Israel
- Occupation: Photographer

Ahlam Shibli (Arabic: أحلام شبلي, born 1970) is a Palestinian photographer, and was born in Shibli-Umm al-Ghanam, Israel. Her work explores themes of home and belonging and documents the life of Arabs in villages unrecognized by Israel in the Negev and northern Galilee regions.

== Early life ==
Shibli was born in 1970, in Israel. The catalog for an exhibition she held in Italy stated that she defines herself as a "Palestinian from Israel". At her "Goter" exhibit at the Tel Aviv Museum, the museum agreed to define Shibli as an "Israeli Palestinian" in the monthly notice of exhibitions, but refused to include this description in the exhibition catalog. Traditionally, Israel's art scene has tended to blur the identity of Arab artists in Israel under the label "Palestinians", though it has begun to include "Palestine" in some form, within limits.

== Career ==
Her artistic medium is photography. Her work explores the life of what she describes as "her people", Arabs of Bedouin descent in Israel. Adrian Searle describes her photographs as "unsentimental and undramatic...extremely moving". In 2005, she photographed Israeli-Arab soldiers who volunteer for military service in the Israel Defense Forces Tracker Unit.

She has also photographed lesbian, gay, bisexual and transgender people in London, Zurich, Barcelona and Tel Aviv; foreigner caregivers and the elderly in Barcelona; and children in orphanages in Poland.

Shibli was chosen as the first Artist-in-Residence for the city of Acre in a program sponsored by that city in conjunction with Israel's Culture and Sport Ministry. Her work, "Five Senses," was exhibited at the 2002 Acco Festival of Alternative Israeli Theatre.

In 2003, Shibli won the 9th Nathan Gottesdiener Israeli Art Prize.

She has participated in the 27th São Paulo Biennial (2006/7), documenta 12 (2008), the 3rd Athens Biennale (2011), and documenta 14 (2017).

== Works ==
=== Solo exhibitions ===
Shibli's photo works are a complex testimony to the presence and absence of a home. Using documentary procedures, Shibli has developed a body of work eschewing the objectivity associated with photojournalism. Rather than visual evidence, her photographic practice involves a conversational engagement with the subjects. Each series encapsulates the knowledge obtained through an empirical contact with colonialism and conflict while eluding climax and drama often deployed by media representations.

Series such as Goter (2002–03), Arab al-Sbaih (2007) and The Valley (2007–08) are informed by a topographic character. Shibli's views of landscapes, towns, precarious settlements, interiors, and exteriors, as well as cemeteries, exhibit an accumulation of signs that reveal the effects of the Israeli rule over the land. An outstanding example of this complex narrative is Trackers (2005), a series of photographs concerned with young Arab men who decide to enroll in the Israeli army. In the artist's own words, the project investigates the price paid by a colonized minority to a majority of colonizers, so they can be accepted, change their identity, survive, or perhaps all of this and more.

More recent works such as Trauma (2008–09) have confronted the ambiguous nature of colonialism and occupation and the relentless search for the meanings of home. Starting with commemorations of the atrocious massacre at Tulle that took place on 9 July 1944, Shibli reflects on the paradox of a population that resisted the German occupation, only to embark a few years later on a colonial war in Indochina and Algeria. Series such as this, or the one dedicated to the daily life in Polish orphanages, Dom Dziecka. The house starves when you are away (2008), or Eastern LGBT (2006), in which Shibli documents the lives of transsexual communities, extend her modus operandi beyond the Palestinian issue.

In the series Death (2011–12), a pivotal work in this exhibition, Shibli explores some of the ways in which the absent ones are present again – 're-presented': Palestinian fighters who fell in the course of their armed resistance against an Israeli incursion, victims of the Israeli military killed under different circumstances (Shahid), men and women who exploded themselves to assassin Israelis (Istishhadi), or the prisoners who in very global terms might be considered failed martyrs.

The numerous representations of martyrs are the visual motif that allows Shibli to reveal how the Palestinian community structures the public and domestic sphere around these absent figures and their death. Often reduced to iconic reproductions that flatten bodies and faces in the name of national identity politics, the compulsive proliferation of memorials bears testimony to the phantomatic nature of home.

== List of exhibitions ==
2024

Ahlam Shibli – Dissonant Belonging. Luma Westbau, Zürich.

2023

Death series. 35th São Paulo Art Biennial, São Paulo, Brazil

2017

- Ahlam Shibli: Staring. Remai Modern Museum, Saskatoon, Canada; curated by Gregory Burke and Sandra Guimarães. web presentation.

2013

- Phantom Home, Barcelona Museum of Contemporary Art, Barcelona, Spain; Jeu de Paume, Paris, France; Museu de Arte Contemporânea de Serralves, Porto, Portugal

2009

- Wydomowienie/Unhoming, Museum of Modern Art, Warsaw, Warsaw, Poland

2007

- Goter, and Trackers, Dundee Contemporary Arts, Dundee, Scotland

2006

- Trackers, Max Wigram Gallery, London, UK; Herzliya Museum of Contemporary Art, Herzliya, Israel; Kunsthalle Basel, Basel, Switzerland

2003

- Lost Time: Unrecognised, Self-Portrait, and Goter, Ikon Gallery, Birmingham, UK
- Goter, Tel Aviv Museum of Art, Tel Aviv

2002

- Positioning, Hagar Art Gallery, Jaffa
- Unrecognised, el Kahif Gallery, Bethlehem
- Five Senses, The Acco Festival of Alternative Israeli Theatre, Acre, Israel

2000

- Unrecognised, al Matal Cultural Center, Ramallah; Heinrich Böll Foundation, Tel Aviv

1999

- Wadi Salib in Nine Volumes, French Cultural Center, Ramallah; Heinrich Böll Foundation, Tel Aviv

== See also ==
- Visual arts in Israel
- Palestinian art
