= Palestinian art =

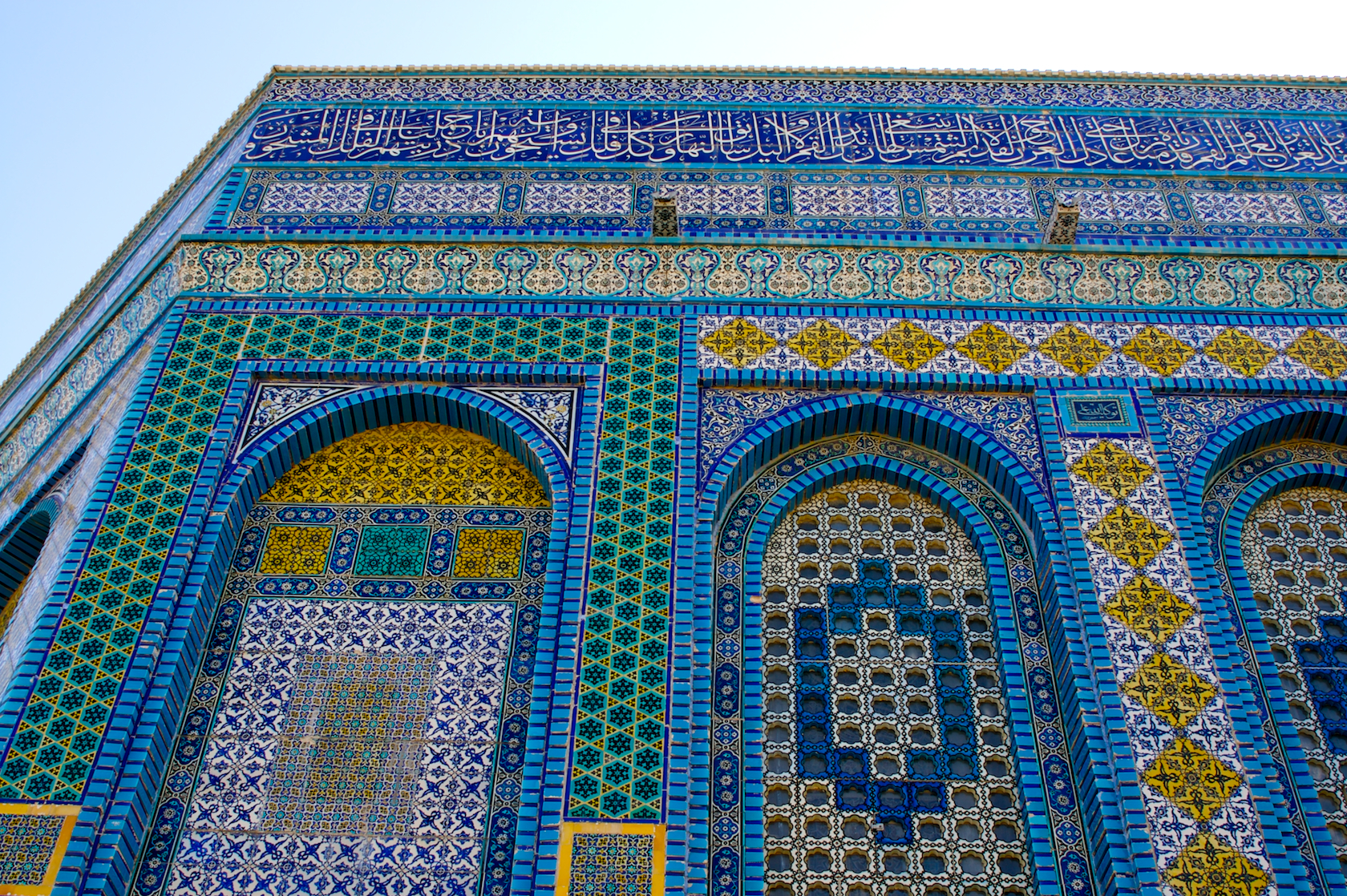
Dome of the Rock mosaic art

Palestinian art is a term used to refer to artwork either originating from historic Palestine, as well as paintings, posters, installation art, costumes, and handcrafts produced by Palestinian artists in modern and contemporary times.

Similar to the structure of Palestinian society, the Palestinian art field extends over four main geographic centers: the modern-day nation of Palestine (consisting of the West Bank and Gaza Strip), Israel, the Palestinian diaspora in the Arab world, and Europe and the United States.

Contemporary Palestinian art finds its roots in folk art and traditional Christian and Islamic painting popular in Palestine over the ages. After the Nakba of 1948, nationalistic themes have predominated as Palestinian artists use diverse media to express and explore their connection to identity and land.

== Themes ==
=== Place ===
Palestinian artist and art historian Kamal Boullata describes "place" as one of the major thematic components of Palestinian art throughout its history. Proximity and distance from the historical Palestinian homeland and the relationship between the artist and his current place of residence is the key element moving Palestinian art. For example, in art produced during the first decades following 1948, works created by Palestinian artists living in Israel are largely figurative, whereas those created by artists living outside the country are largely abstract. Before 1948, Jerusalem was an important theme. After 1948, memory of place and distance from homeland became a central theme. Even Palestinian artists born and raised in Israel explore alienation and a sense of growing up as foreigners in the land of their ancestors. The question of cultural memory and belonging is a recurrent theme.

Nidaa Badwan is an artist from who created a beautiful space in her room where she could isolate herself and escape from reality of Gaza. She says living in a city where she "lost basic rights as a human being" inspired her to "create an alternative world" in her room. The self-portraits taken in that room during her period of retreat have won her international recognition. Alia Rayyan, director of the Al Hoash Gallery has said that Badwan is "talking about her own creation of the space, a dream actually, how life could be there, but this only works in combination with what happens outside".

=== Symbols ===
Key iconic symbols are keys and doors. Likewise the cactus tree plays a prominent role. According to Palestinian artist and art historian Samia Halaby, "Liberation Art," or the art that resulted from the revolutionary period of Palestinian resistance that began in the late 1960s and continued through the First Intifada, "is symbolist, using images of things known to popular Palestinian culture – things that anyone experiencing Palestinian life could identify. The horse came to mean revolution. The flute came to mean the tune of the ongoing resistance. The wedding came to mean the entire Palestinian cause. The key came to mean the right of return. The sun came to mean freedom. The gun with a dove came to mean that peace would come after the struggle for liberation. Artists used the colors of the flag, patterns from embroidery, chains, etc. Village scenes, village dress, the prisoner, prison bars. There were special themes regarding the martyr. First there were generalized pictures of the martyr as well as pictures of specific individuals who had been killed by the Israelis. The second form was based on a popular practice of framing a collage of symbols representing the deceased's life then hanging it at their home or grave."

==== Cactus ====
The Cactus (Arabic: الصبار) has been a motif in Palestinian art since the birth of Israel. For Zionists, the indigenous plant became a national symbol of their birth in the land, while Palestinians saw it as an incarnation of their national dispossession and exile (see, for example, the Arabic version of Sahar Khalifa's Wild Thorns, the Arabic title of which translates literally as Cactus). The plant served the practical function to designate territorial borders in peasant villages. In summer, the prickly pear was a common fruit eaten by people in the region. During the 1920s, the thorny tree was incorporated as a symbol of Israeli identity. Nicolas Saig painted the prickly pear as one of the pleasures of the era. The cactus has also become a symbol of Palestinian defiance and sumud. Villagers incorporated it into a dance song protesting the 1917 Balfour Declaration with the phrase "Ya'ayn kuni subbara - O eye, be a cactus tree!".

==== The Dove ====
The Dove (Arabic: الحمامة) is a commonly used symbol in Palestinian art. Artists use the Dove to convey a message of peace, freedom, and a future following the suffering that Palestinians have experienced. The Dove is known for its soft and peaceful shape, reflecting a gentle nature. The dove, with its serene form, tranquil color, gentle demeanor, and softness, stands as the most fitting symbol to convey this message. Artists depict the symbolism of the dove in various ways, employing different techniques and compositions to convey their intended message to the world. Often, it is intertwined with other symbols and incorporated into diverse artistic compositions.

==== Anemone Coronaria ====
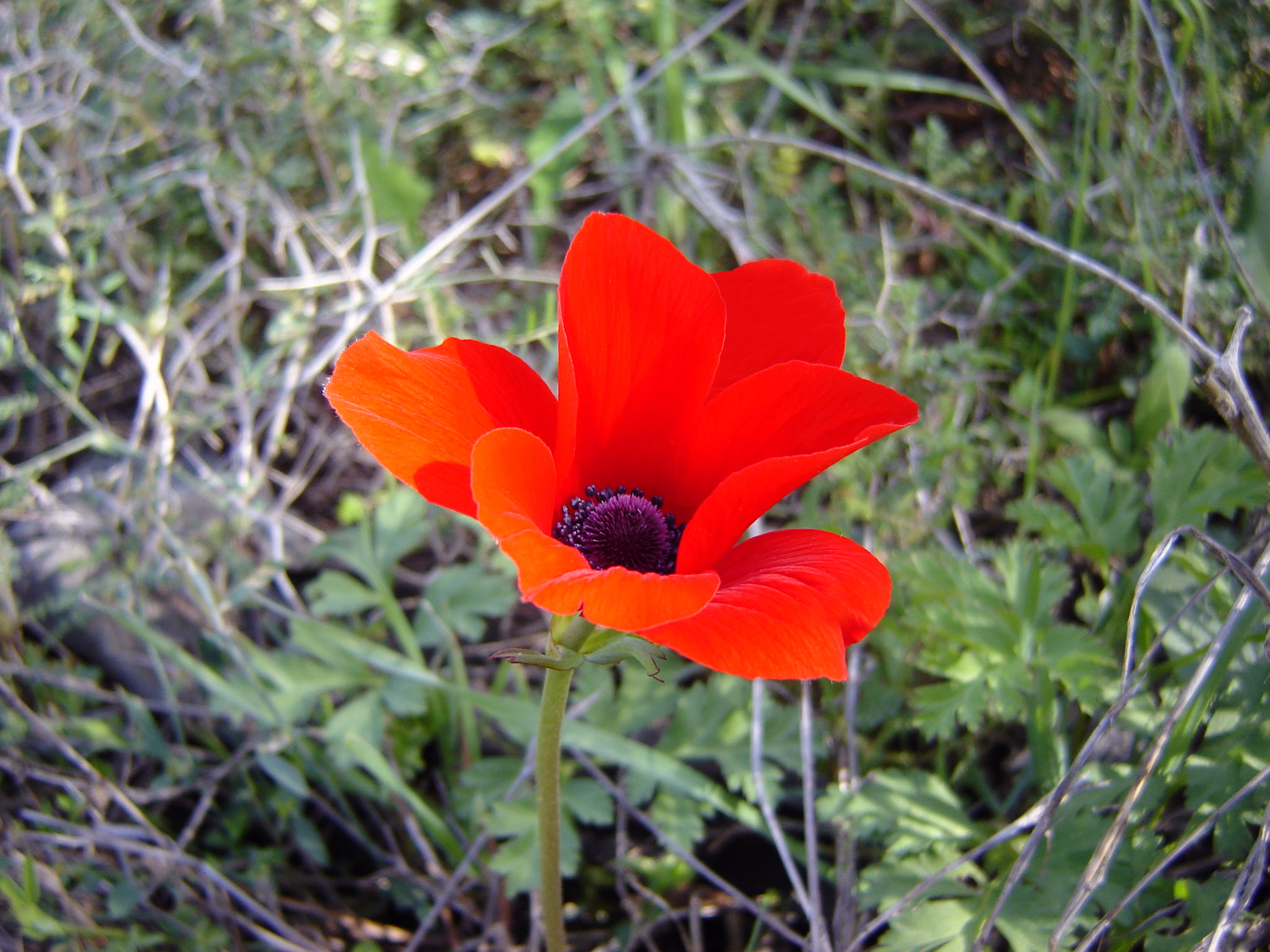
Anemone Coronaria

The Anemone Coronaria (Shqa’eq Al Nu’man) is an indigenous red flower. The flower grows on the top of the mountains in Palestine, and emerges amidst the rugged terrain, pushing through the cracks in the rocks. The flower's living environment, its bright red color, and delicate leaves symbolically reflect the blend of the challenging and harsh circumstances endured by Palestinians and the blood and sacrifice of Palestinian martyrs in their struggle for resistance. The reproduction of the Anemone Coronaria emerges as a fundamental symbol of commemoration, aiming to protect the national identity and legacy of Palestinians against the backdrop of the traumatic landscape of Israeli occupation, which involves the confiscation of their cultural and ecological assets.

==== The Jaffa Orange ====
The Jaffa Orange (Arabic: البرتقال) emerged as a symbolic representation of the Palestinian people, embodying the essence of the "Product of Palestine" showcased to the global audience since the 19th century. The prosperity of orange exports signified the prosperity of the nation. The Zionist movement in 1948 not only seized control of Palestinian orange groves lining the coast but also appropriated the iconic "Jaffa Orange" brand, along with the cities of Jaffa and Haifa, reshaping the orange as a symbol of the "new" Israel established on Palestinian lands following the displacement of its people. The cultural appropriation of Jaffa oranges symbolized the theft of the homeland for Palestinians. It encompassed the loss of orange groves, the loss of Palestine, the destruction of communities and national identity, and the loss of numerous lives. As a result, the orange became a poignant symbol of deep loss, reflecting the stripping away of a nation's identity.

==== The Palestinian Key ====
The Palestinian Key is a popular symbol used by artists. It has deep symbolic significance for Palestinians, representing the right of return for Palestinian refugees who were displaced during the 1948 war (Nakba). Despite the destruction and demolition of their homes, Elderly Palestinians retain their keys as a symbol of their determination to return home, back to areas of former Mandatory Palestine, and their rightful claim to live peacefully on their land. These keys serve as tangible evidence of their connection to their ancestral homes.

==== The Olive Tree ====
Symbolism of the Palestinian Olive Tree

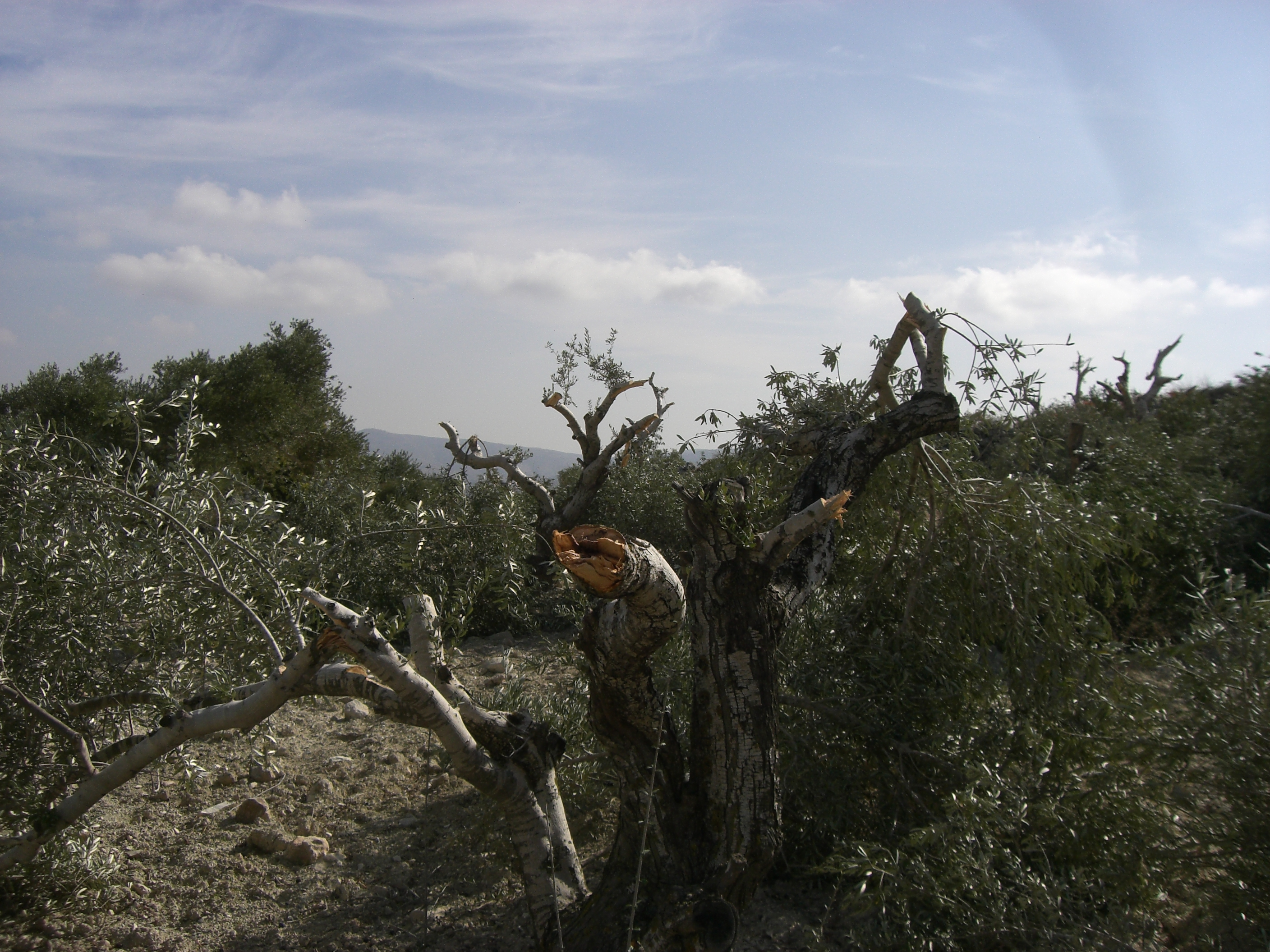
On November 12th, 2009, a group of Jewish settlers from the Israeli settlement of Yitzhar in Area C of the occupied West Bank cut down over 80 olive trees in the Palestinian village of Burin, south of Nablus.

Palestinian Olive tree carry the symbolic connotations of resilience, health, ancestral ties and community. Researchers have found that the olive tree are tied into the Palestinian's Sutra, A’wana and Sumud. The tree is a means of survival and security, represents their bond to their land, community, and animals. Olive trees also serve as a symbol of their identities, which includes their physical and emotional aspects and their socio-cultural values. Palestinian people view the olive trees as the first witnesses that Palestine is their homeland.

The season harvest is referred to as, ‘Palestine’s wedding’ and is considered a national holiday where children and faculty members receive two days off school to join the harvest. This allows community members to gather and serve as a ritual that encompasses their values surrounding family, labor power, community and aid for other members of the community that do not possess land. This is practice through the tradition of leaving fruit on a tree during the harvest so that those who do not have land and are unable to partake in the harvest can still reap the benefits.

The symbolism connotation of resistance that is attached to the olive tree in Palestine comes from the displacement of Palestinian peoples. During Nakba in 1948 many Palestinian people were displaced and there was a massive land loss that included the loss of olive trees. Olives make up 25% of Palestine's economy as they use it to create oil, fuel, food and for medicinal products. In 1967, Israeli Defense Forces (IDF) had seized further land territories in the Gaza Strip and West Bank where the majority of the olive trees are planted. With new zoning, checkpoints, and illegal walls being built the laborers had to seek permits to harvest their olive trees. As a form of resistance, Palestinian people would plant olive trees to prevent Israeli forces from taking more land and this has shaped the new symbolism of resistance.

== Politics ==
Before 1948, most Palestinian artists were self-taught, painting landscapes and religious scenes in imitation of the European style. Art exhibitions were almost unheard of. Notable artists of this era include Khalil Halaby, Nahil Bishara and Faddoul Odeh. Jamal Badran (1909–1999) was a leading artist in the Islamic style. Sophie Halaby studied in France and Italy before returning to teach at the Schmidt Girls College in 1935–1955.

One of the earliest artists to add a political dimension to his works was Nicola Saig (1863–1942). While most of the art in his day explored religious themes and non-controversial issues, Saig's work ventured into politics. Caliph Umar at Jerusalem Gates c. 1920, for example, seems to recount a popular religious legend about Umar bloodlessly taking over Jerusalem and ushering centuries of peace between the local Christian and Jewish populations. However, upon closer look, the Christ-like stature given to the Caliph jab at what many Palestinians saw as divisive policies of the British during the Mandate Period which attempted to create friction between Muslims and Christian Arabs.

After 1948, Ismail Shammout, Naji al-ali, Mustafa al-Hallaj, Abdul Hay Mosallam and Paul Guiragossian tackled the painful memories of the Nakba showing massacres, refugees and clear political themes. Others such as Sophia Halaby, Ibrahim Ghannam, and Juliana Seraphim focused more subtly on questions of identity including Palestinian cultural traditions, physical geography, and a surrealistic look at memories of childhood reverie. Political parties supported Palestinian artists to discover new symbols for the Palestinian national movement.

According to Tal Ben Zvi, Palestinian artists after 1948 reside in four different geographical loci: (West Bank Gaza Strip), Israel, the Arab lands, and the diaspora, and have no art colleges. Thus unlike independent sovereign states where art is based on "national borders, national museums and institutes of learning," he claims Palestinian art is based chiefly on artists operating within the frame of Palestinian national identity.

=== Modernism ===
Although the Palestinian struggle stands as a great source of inspiration for many artists, Palestinian art is not solely defined by the political character of Palestine. Palestinian modern art has become part of a successive process in which Palestinian culture and heritage play an essential role. The post Nakbah period has affected a great deal of art work, however, new generations of Palestinian artists redefined new boundaries of representation and creativity. The new generations of Palestinian artists have presented their work in a new manner reshaping the traditional representation of Palestinian art, and challenged the understanding of international audiences of the Palestinian Art and narrative.

Graffiti on a wall in a refugee camp in Nablus.

=== Graffiti ===
Lacking access to national media, political gatherings, or other avenues of self-determination, Palestinians turned to graffiti as a means of circumventing censorship and conveying political messages. This form of expression served various purposes: at times, it bolstered the persistence of the intifada and its strategies of civil disobedience; at other times, it asserted the influence of specific political factions within certain regions. Moreover, graffiti served as a platform for the assertion of Palestinian national identity. Contemporary graffiti on the separation wall serves as a "global canvas" for both local Palestinian and transnational graffiti artists to convey experiences of occupation to audiences worldwide. The messages and images, framed to address specific issues, are disseminated to transnational audiences through various channels such as electronic media, published compilations of wall graffiti, and personal/tourist sharing of experiences. This transnational circulation of graffiti provides Palestinians with opportunities to bypass contemporary censorship and address the constraints of stunted economic development.

=== The Palestinian narrative through Art ===
The Palestinian genocide by Israel and the narratives surrounding it gives Palestinian art a unique character. Palestinian art often touches on two major themes, one is the potential for contemporary art to affect people's understanding of the social, cultural, and political elements of the Palestinian narrative; and the contribution this art can make in the field of art history. The narrative of Palestinian art can be better understood by using the unique perspectives of the multiple Palestinian artist whose interpretation is often a first hand account.

The vivid political message in Palestinian contemporary art led to the realization of the so-called "liberation art of Palestine" where Palestinian artists use art to communicate their narrative beyond the level of straightforwardness that is presented by media. There is a deep connection between the visual production of Palestinian art and the physical makeup of the land of historical Palestine.

Palestinian art has gone through multiple phases where the Palestinian artists dealt with cycles of production, destruction, and reestablishment due their diaspora from one area to another. With the continuation of the Palestinian genocide, the artists like any other segment of the Palestinian community in the Occupied Palestinian Territory suffer from Israeli exaction such as confiscation of art work, refusal to license artists' organizations, arson of exhibit halls, surveillance, arrests. Palestinian art narrative does not exclusively criticize the Israeli occupation, it also speak of the neglect of the Arab states, and the world at large of their struggle. A famous short novel by the Palestinian writer Ghassan Kanafani, Men in the Sun, speaks of the Palestinian struggle and the astonishing neglect of the international community towards their cause.

Several comic artists have also used the visual medium to express their anguish of being denied the "right to return". One among them is the popular artist Naji al-Ali whose figure of Handala is commemorated as the symbol of Palestinian resistance. Naji al-Ali produced several caricatures right after al-Nakba which expressed his determination for a Palestinian revolution.

=== Galleries and museums ===
The Palestinian Museum

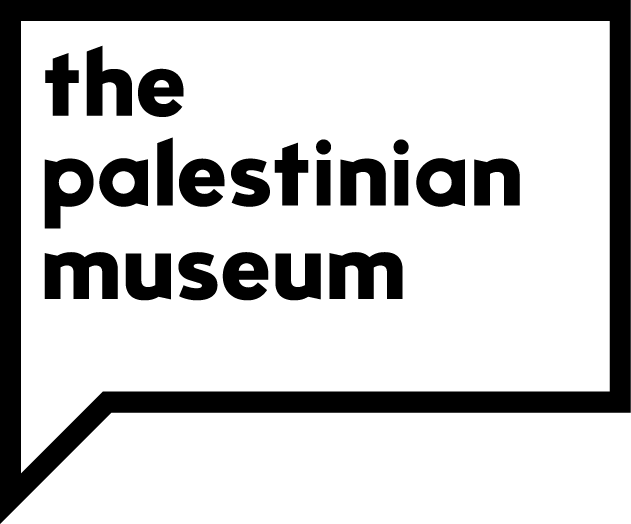
The Palestinian Museum Logo

The Palestinian Museum, established in 2017, is dedicated to Palestinian art and culture. It hosts variety of exhibitions, education and research programs, and cultural events. It is located in Birzeit which is 7 km north of the city of Ramallah. It is led by the curator Mahmoud Hawari.

The Ethnographic and Art Museum at Birzeit University

The Ethnographic and Art Museum at Birzeit University is a permanent museum with two main collections: The Palestinian Costumes, and The Tawfiq Canaan Amulet Collection. The Virtual Gallery at Birzeit University is a leading art gallery in the Palestinian Territory promoting visual art through exhibitions, training and educational workshops.

Al-Ma'mal Foundation for Contemporary Art

Al Ma'mal Foundation for Contemporary Art was established in 1998 as a development of the Anadiel Gallery work, which started in 1992. It was founded by a group of Palestinian artists who with an aim of promoting the Palestinian art scene. Anadiel was the first independent gallery in Palestine. The Gallery hosts Palestinian artists from the Diaspora some of whom have never visited Palestine. They participate in these artistic activities as tourists with foreign passports. Al-Ma'mal focusses on projects with youth and women. Al- Ma'mal is an Arabic word meaning workshop or a small factory. The name was given because of the initial home of the foundation which was in a small factory in the old city of Jerusalem built in 1900.

Palestinian Art Court - al Hoash

Al Hoash is a non- profit Palestinian cultural organization established in 2004 with a mission "To provide and sustain a knowledge based platform for Palestinians to express, explore, realize and strengthen their national and cultural identity through visual practice." We seek the development and elevation of arts as we recognize its role in the welfare, development, free will and expression of people and emphasize its role as a constituent and representative of the cultural identity as part of the national identity.

=== Contemporary art institutions ===
Palestinian Association for Contemporary Art

A nongovernmental and non profit organization working mainly in the field of visual arts. It was established by Palestinian artists and individuals who have an interest in developing the field of visual art in Palestine. Its mission is to bridge the Palestinian and Arab culture with international cultures abroad. The Association established the International Art Academy in Ramallah, and continues to work on other projects. The founders believe that art and culture play a major role in the realization of the Palestinian dream of freedom and self- determination. Featured artists of the association include: Ahmad Canaan, Houssni Radwan, Tayseer Barakat, Nabil Anani, Munther Jawabra, Ahlam Al Faqih, and Dina Ghazal.

ArtPalestine international

ArtPalestine international is a New York City-based cultural organization dedicated to Palestinian contemporary art. It cooperate with museums, galleries, and NGOs to produce events, exhibitions and publications on Palestinian contemporary art. Through its activities, the organization encourages cultural art between Palestine and the West. The organization collaborated with major Palestinian artists including Larissa Sansour, Khalil Rabah, Sharif Waked, Taysir Batniji, Wafa Hourani, and Shadi Habib Allah.

International Art Academy Palestine

A Palestinian institution specializing in higher education programs in the field of visual art. The academy offers a BA in Contemporary Visual Art, and working on developing a range of courses at BA and MA level. Through its four-year program study, the academy provides Palestinians the opportunity to develop their talents and creativity. The academy promotes the potential of Palestinian artists' creativity and allows for the development of individual expression. Its aim is to develop a new generation of Palestinian artists to converse with contemporary debates and methods of artistic practice at the local and the international level. The academy is also keen to maintain a Palestinian collective memory, history, and identity through education and creative activities. The academy hosts a group of international students, artists, and visiting lecturers through its exchange programs. The academy was funded by the Norwegian Ministry of Foreign Affairs during it first years 2006–2009.

Picasso in Palestine

One of the International Art Academy's main accomplishment was its co-operation with the Dutch Van Abbemuseum in Eindhoven in bringing a Picasso piece to Palestine in July 2011. It took two years of planning until the "Buste de Femme" arrived to Ramallah in the West Bank. The piece is a Cubist rendition of a woman painted in 1943 with a value of $7.2M. "Buste de Femme" is the first modernist masterpiece to make it to Palestine where it is exhibited to a Palestinian audience. Palestinians see that the Picasso piece made it through protocols, peace agreements, and checkpoints to demonstrate Picasso's saying: Painting is not made to decorate houses, it is an instrument of offensive and defensive war against the enemy.

== Palestinian artists in Palestine ==
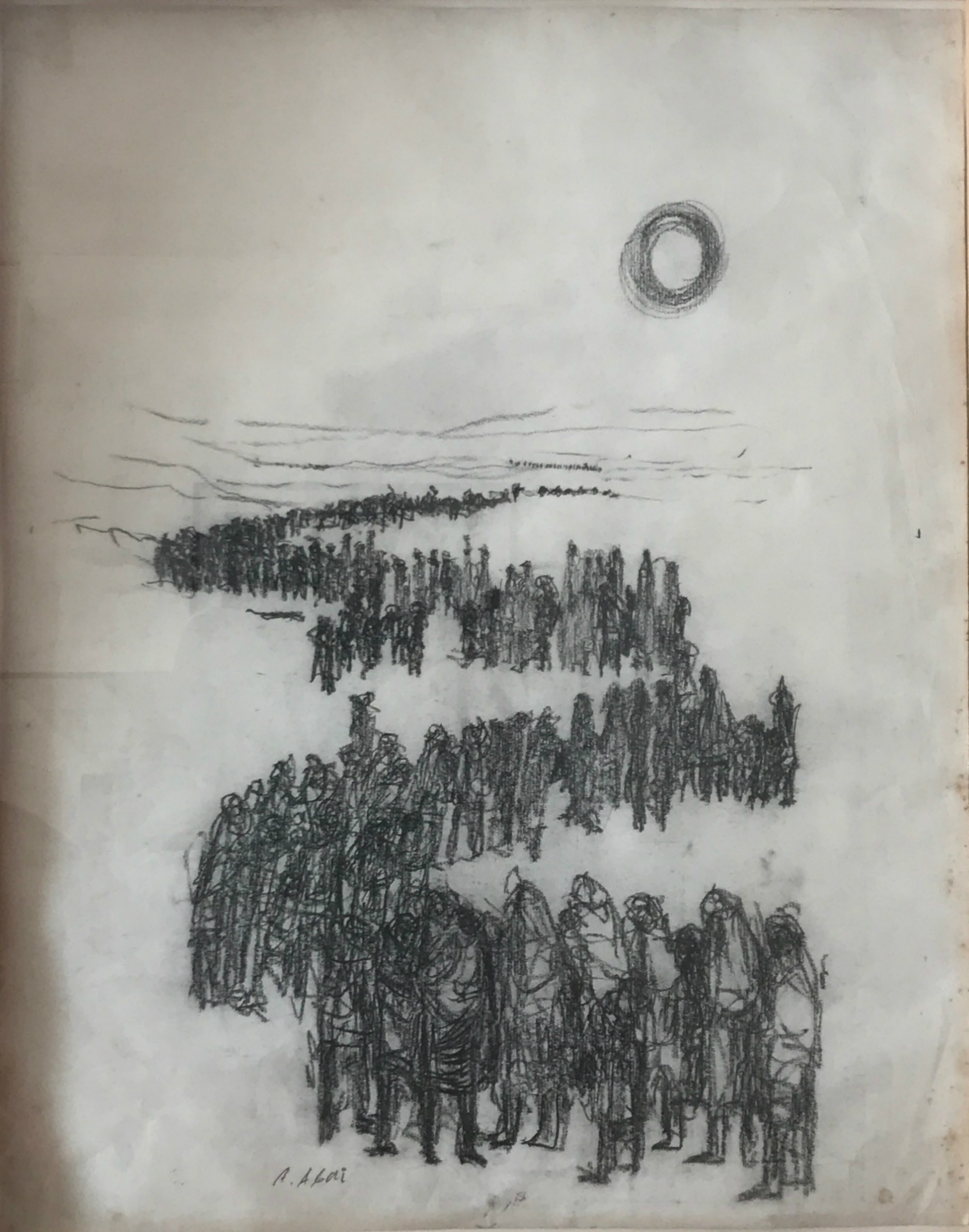
Fleeing... from the Massacre, Abed Abdi, 1976

There is a significant difference between Palestinian artists beyond the Green Line and the ones called "the Palestinian artists of 48". The artists born after 1948 are usually divided between the older painters and sculptors who acted during the 1970s and the 1980s, and the younger generation of artists who became active in the 1990s. The first, older generation comprises about twenty painters and sculptors who were born into the period of military rule over the Israeli Arab minority (1948–1966) and who studied art in Israel and abroad in the 1970s and 1980s. They include artists such as Souad Nasr Makhoul, Terese Nasr Azzam, Ibrahim Nubani and Abed Abdi, the latter who is considered to be a pioneer in the Arab Israeli art movement. The younger generation of artists became active after the Oslo agreements and now amounts to more than 200 art school graduates creating mainly installations, photography, video art and performances. The last decade shows a noticeable increase in the number of Palestinian students in Israeli art academies such as in the Bezalel Academy of Art and Design.

Hisham Zreiq, Ahlam Shibli, Sami Bukhari, Reida Adon, Ashraf Fawakhry, Ahlam Jomah, Jumana Emil Abboud, and Anisa Ashkar are Palestinian artists—most of whom are graduates from art schools in Israel and form part of an entire generation of Palestinians, citizens of Israel born after 1967.

The issue of identity for Palestinian citizens of Israel is a key subject of importance to the artwork produced. This identity is described by Azmi Bishara as:

From both the historical and theoretical perspectives, the Arabs in Israel are part of the Palestinian Arab people. Their definition as 'Israeli Arabs' was formed concurrent with the emergence of the issue of the Palestinian refugees, and the establishment of the State of Israel on the ruins of the Palestinian people. Thus, the point of departure from which the history of the Palestinians in Israel is written is the very point in which the history of the Palestinians outside Israel was created. One cannot point at a nationality or national group called 'Israeli Arabs' or 'the Arabs of Israel'.

Ben Zvi suggests that this definition pinpoints the dialectic underpinning the identity of this group of artists who are identified "on the one hand, as part of a broad Palestinian cultural system, and on the other—in a differentiated manner—as the Palestinian minority in Israel."

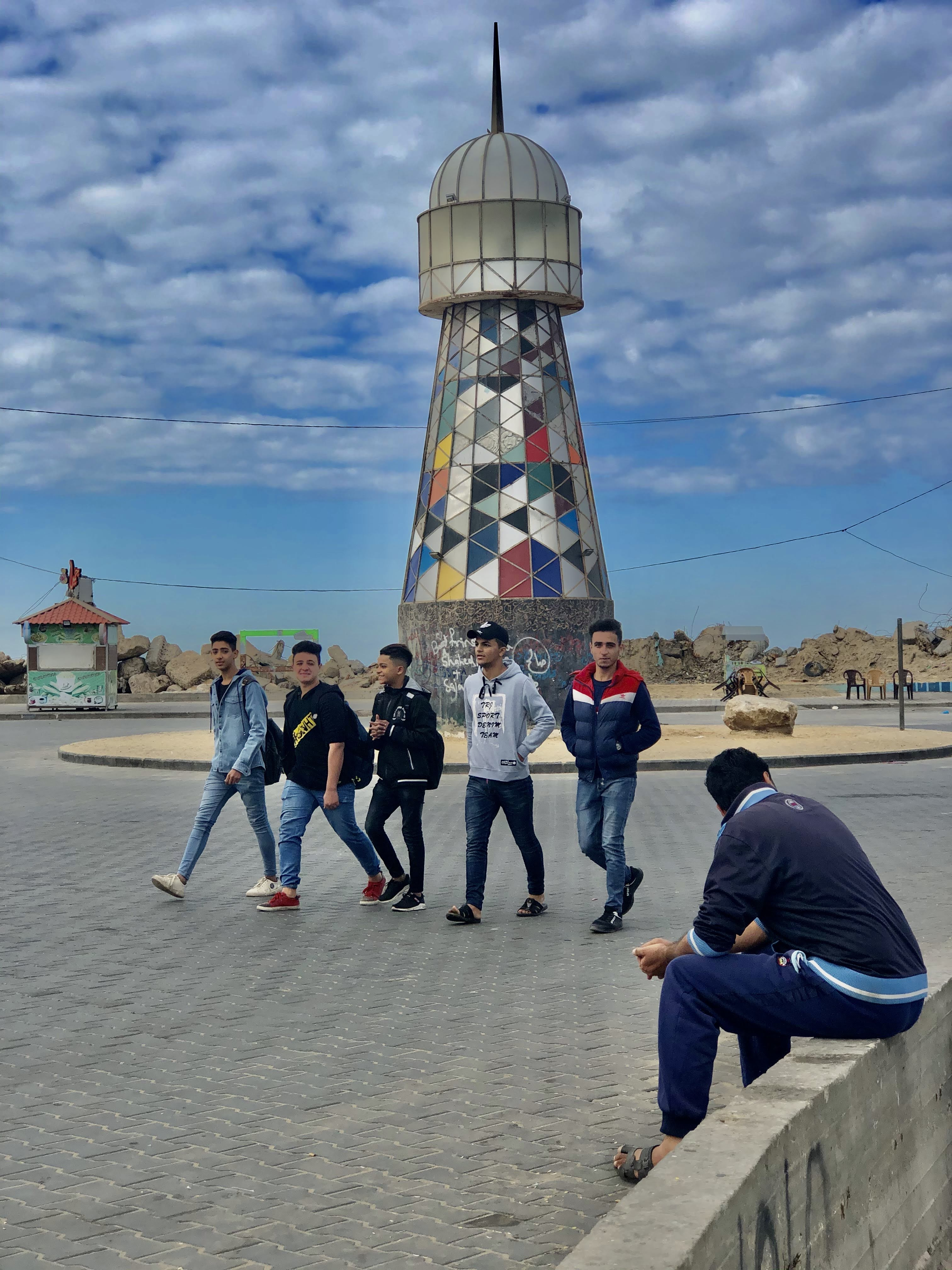
Shareef Sarhan created The Lighthouse of Gaza sculpture in 2016.

The issue of identity becomes particularly clear in an artwork of the Palestinian artist Raafat Hattab from Jaffa. The video performance "untitled" was part of the exhibition "Men in the Sun" in the Herzliya Museum of Contemporary Art in 2009. In the work, Raafat Hattab is seen as he pours water into a bucket in order to lengthily water an olive tree which is a sign for the lost paradise before 1948. The scene is primed by the song Hob (Love) by the Lebanese Ahmad Kaabour which expresses the need for Palestinian solidarity. The chorus repeats the phrase "I left a place" and it seems as if the video is dealing with memory. But as the camera zooms out, the spectator realizes that Hattab and the olive tree both actually stand in the middle of the Rabin Square, a main place in Tel Aviv, and the water used for watering the tree comes from the nearby fountain. "In my installations I appear in different identities that combined are my identity—a Palestinian minority in Israel and a queer minority in the Palestinian culture", explains Rafaat Hattab in an interview with the Tel Avivian City Mouse Magazine.

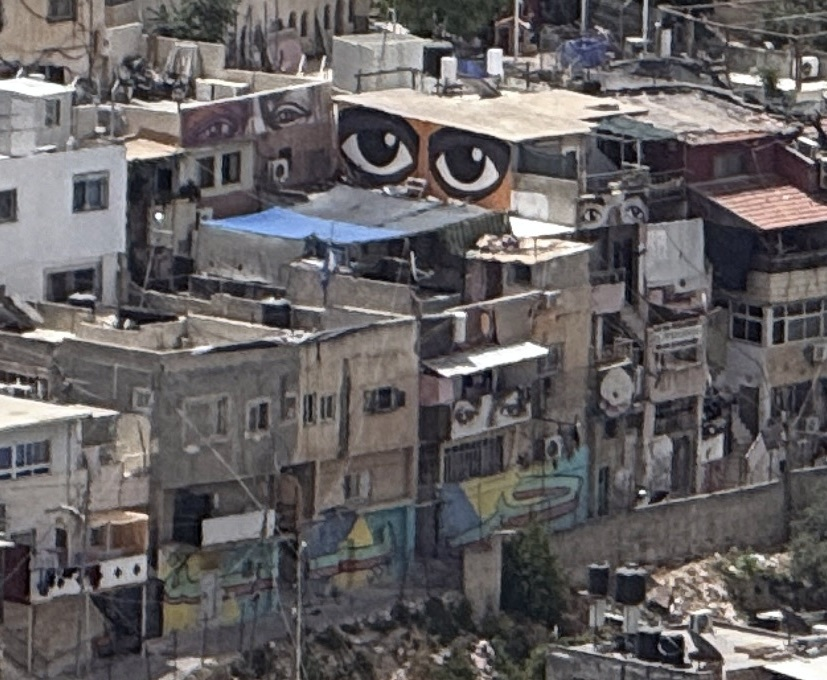
The I Witness Silwan art installation includes murals painted on houses in Batn al-Hawa marked for demolition or eviction

Asim Abu Shaqra's focus of the sabra plant (prickly pear cactus) in his paintings is another example of the centrality of identity, especially vis-a-vie the Palestinian subject's Israeli counterpart, in Palestinian art. Tal Ben Zvi writes that Abu Shaqra is one of the very few Palestinian artists, who have succeeded in entering the canon of Israeli art. Abu Shaqra painted various paintings featuring the sabra, both a symbol for the Palestinian Nakba and a symbol for the new Israeli and his work stirred up a debate in the Israeli art discourse over the image of the sabra in Israeli culture and over questions of cultural appropriation and ownership of this image.

Israeli art historian Gideon Ofrat argues that understanding Palestinian art requires familiarity with the complexities of Palestinian culture, language and history, and therefore attempts by Israeli art critics to analyze Palestinian art are doomed to failure.

Souad Nasr (Makhoul), a female Palestinian painter based in Haifa is an artist, most of whose works deal with women from a universal point of view. She is also a city and regional planner. Her earlier works in art were inspired by the remains of the old Palestinian Arab demolished quarters and expressed them very strongly in her works, in addition to a large series of documentary works: paintings, etchings and drawings of historical buildings and neighborhoods in Haifa and other cities, in which she expressed the significant urban design and architectural motives. Her current paintings mainly express woman's universal sentimentality and soul through body language and the interaction with nature in which she tries to outline how aesthetic valuing is embedded in our relationship with nature, and its ecological aesthetic qualities such as variety, diversity and harmony. For her acrylic works she uses mostly recycled paper which has a special texture effect and is part of her views on environmental protection.

== Exhibitions ==
=== Museums ===
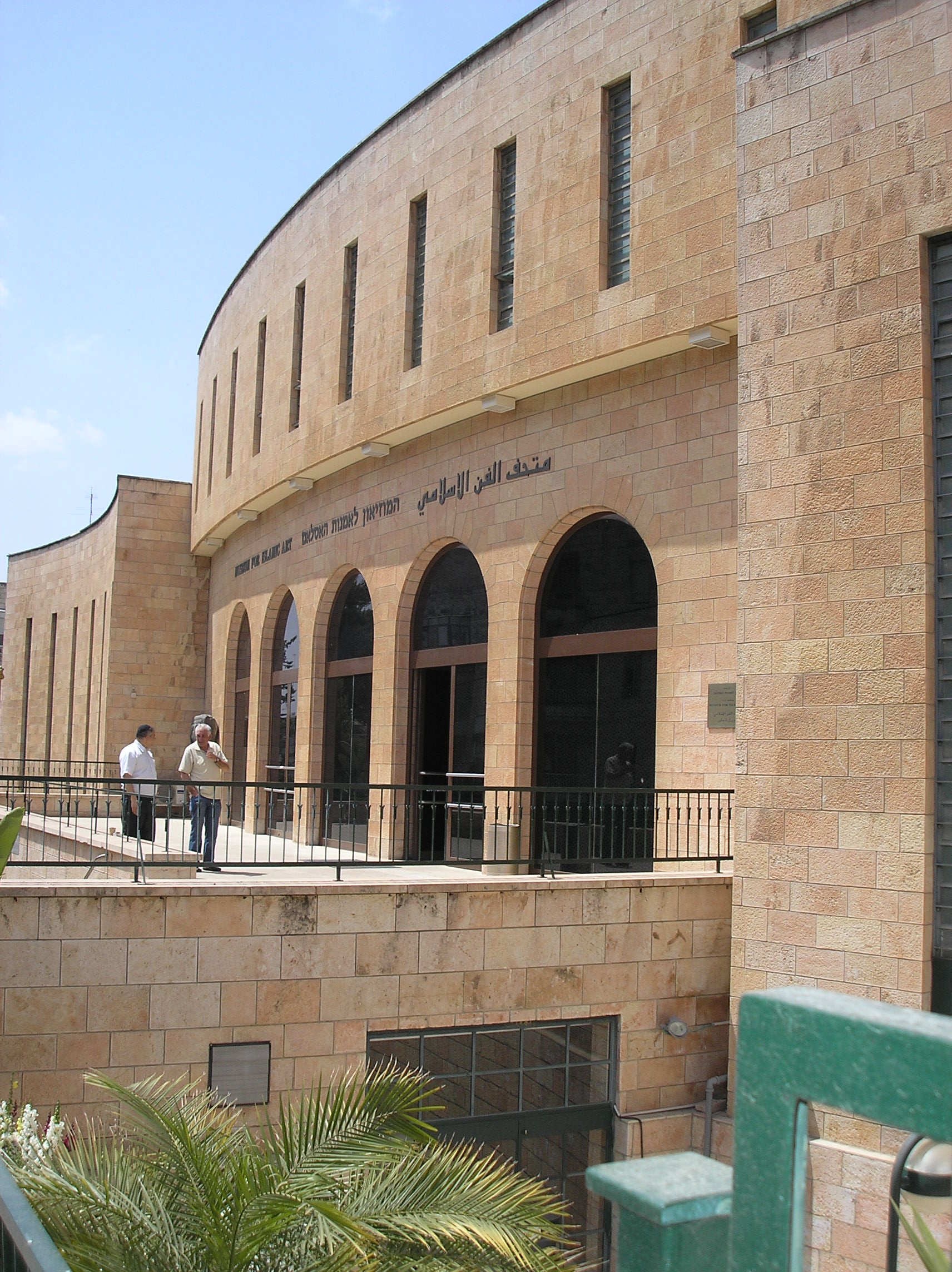
The L.A. Mayer Institute for Islamic Art

In 2008, the L. A. Mayer Institute for Islamic Art in Jerusalem, a museum mainly dedicated to antiquities and ethnographic works, presented the first show of local Arab contemporary artists in a public Israeli museum. It was also the first exhibition in an Israeli museum which was organised by an Arab curator, Farid Abu Shakra.

The theme of the exhibition, Correspondence, is dealing with the complex situation of Arab citizens in Israel. It can be seen as a reflection on the different cultures to which Arab artists in Israel are exposed, on Western influences and Arab traditions, Jewish life, Palestinian cause and the search of a proper identity. Although not all art works presented are political, many refer to collective experiences of the Palestinian people, showing lost Arab villages and divided landscapes and evoking thus the Nakba. Besides the Israeli–Palestinian conflict, some works question traditions and customs within the Arab culture by dealing with gender and superstition.

According to the director of the Museum, the Jewish Israeli Rachel Hasson, it was rather difficult to raise funds for the exhibition among Jewish, Muslim or Arab communities. In The Art Newspaper she was quoted: "For Arabs, we are not Arab enough and for Jews, we are not Jewish enough."

In summer 2009, the Herzliya Museum of Contemporary Art held the exhibition "Men in the Sun" presenting art works by 13 Palestinian contemporary artists who live and work in Israel. The name of the exhibition is borrowed from Ghassan Kanafani's novel with the same title. The show was curated by the Palestinian artist and architect Hanna Farah-Kufer Bir'im and the Jewish Israeli art historian Tal Ben Zvi. The participating artists were from different generations and using different techniques from painting to video installations and architecture.The motif of the exhibition was location and territory. Most of the works deal with the sense of belonging to the Palestinian territory, some evoke the right to return or are about the forgotten history of places like in Jaffa.

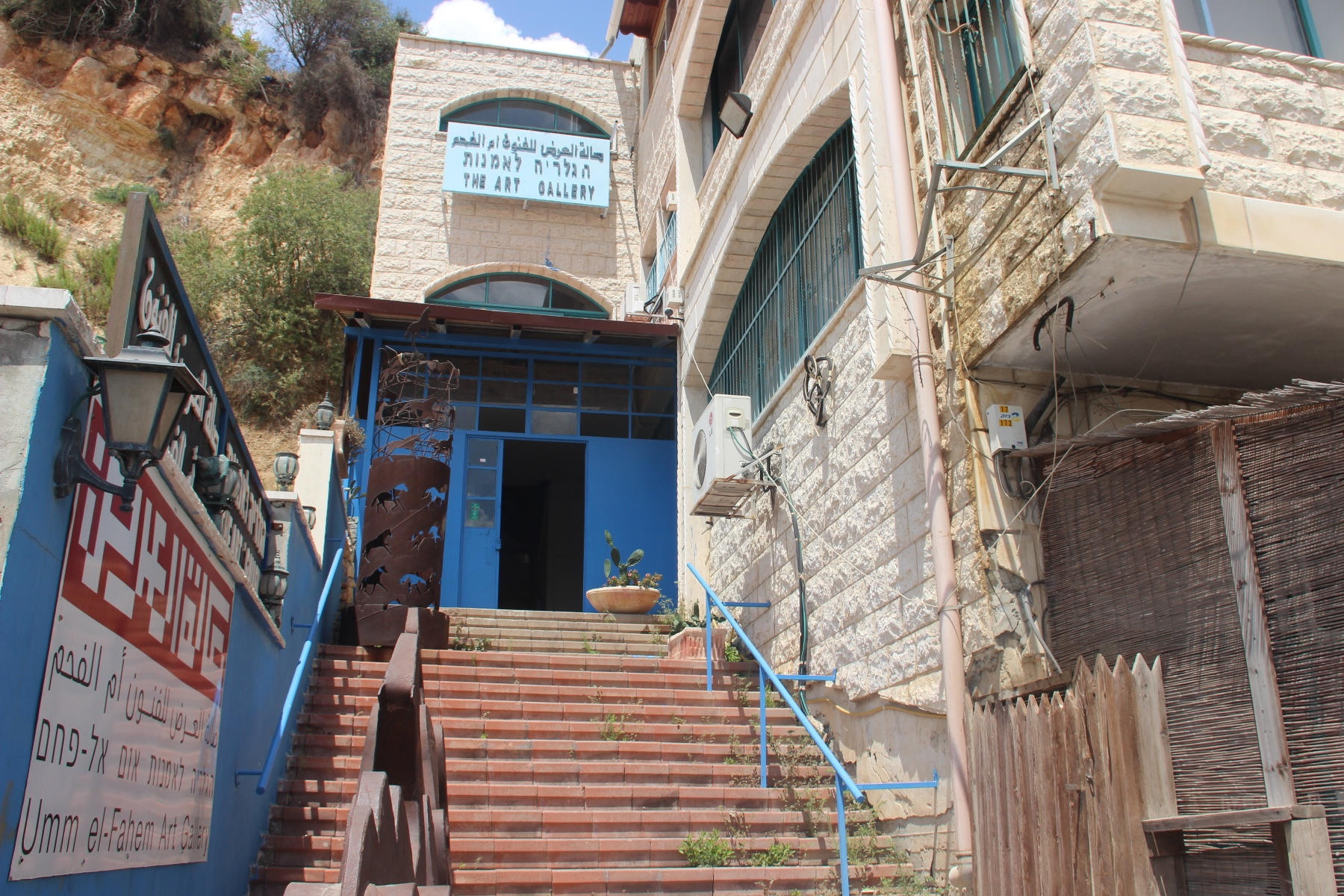
The Umm al-Fahm Art Gallery

In the beginning of 2012, the Tel Aviv Museum of Art in a collaboration with the Umm el-Fahm Art Gallery showed a retrospective of the Arab Israeli artists Walid Abu Shakra. The show was curated by the Jewish Israeli Irith Hadar and Walid's brother Farid Abu Shakra.Born in Umm el-Fahem in 1946 and now based in London, the exhibition shows the strong ties which Walid Abu Shakra holds with his birthplace. The name of the exhibition, "Mintarat al-Batten", refers to a hill near his hometown which, due to its strategic position, became the site of a watchtower. Because of the population explosion in the region, the picturesque landscapes are disappearing and the slopes of the watchtower hill are now covered with new residential neighbourhoods. The artist hoped that thanks to the exhibition, "all my friends, family and residents of the village who came to see the work will show more love and seriousness in their attitude toward the landscape that remains in the village."

The idea for the exhibition and its collaboration with the Umm el-Fahm Art Gallery was a fruit of the friendship between Mordechai Omer, the former director of the Tel Aviv Museum of Art, and the Abu Shakra family. Omer died before the opening of show.

=== The Umm el-Fahm Museum of Contemporary Art project ===
In 1996, Said Abu Shakra, the third brother of the Abu Shakra family, founded in his hometown Umm al-Fahm the only art gallery for Palestinian and Arab art in Israel and has now plans for its extension. He wants to build a museum nearby the city which would be the first contemporary art museum of the Arab sector in Israel. The project, worth 30 million dollars, is still at an early stage. In an international competition, Amnon Bar Or, Lior Tsionov, and Lior Vitkon, a team of Jewish architects, had been chosen. With the help of the American Friends of Umm el-Fahem (AFUEF) and the Middle East Center for the Arts (MECA), funds had been raised to secure the first phase of the project.

The museum shall not only host exhibitions but also an archive collecting testimonies of Arab "elders" who witnessed the conflicts of the 20th century. The oral testimonies – ranging from the British mandate period to the creation of the Israeli state and the Arab-Israeli wars – are transcribed in Arabic, Hebrew and English and photographs are taken. Established in 2008, 250 testimonies are already recorded of which one third has died since. Along with the museum, there will be classrooms and an auditorium for Arab Israeli students, a library and a café. The existing gallery has already begun to acquire a collection for the further museum through donations and gifts. Thus, works of artists like Fatma Abu Roumi, Assam Abu Shakra, Tyseer Barakat, Assaf Evron, Khalid Hourani, Menashe Kadishman, and Sliman Mansour are already in its possession. In addition to contemporary art, the museum will also expose traditional Arab embroidery works from the local region.

According to The Guardian, Said Abu Shakra wants to create thus "an inviting place, capable of embracing and enriching; bridging gaps and connecting different cultures. All of this in the heart of a troubled, war-weary region," where "Jewish people [have] the chance to touch the pain, the history and the culture of Arab people"

The project had to be inaugurated in 2013, but it was cancelled due to lack of budget, when sponsors from Gulf states found out the Israeli government is supporting the creation of the museum. Abu Shakra had to give up on the plan to build a new museum. He currently tries to receive an official recognition as a museum in the gallery's present 1700 square meter building.

=== Galleries ===
In 1996, after 25 years of police service, Said Abu Shakra decided to open the first art gallery in Israel entirely dedicated to contemporary Palestinian art in his hometown Umm el-Fahm, the Umm el-Fahem Art Gallery. Nevertheless, besides Palestinian and Arab artists, the gallery does also showcase Jewish and foreign artists. Indeed, when in 1999 Yoko Ono exhibited her art in the gallery, the institution came to public attention. According to the BBC, the Japanese artist wanted "to "balance" a show of her work in the Israel Museum in Jerusalem". Some of her art work is still shown in the permanent exhibition of the gallery.

The Gallery promotes mainly temporary shows, dealing with a wide range of subjects but sometimes with a special focus on memory and history of the region. This is in accordance with the 2008 started project of an archive collecting Palestinian testimonies (see The Umm el-Fahem Museum of Contemporary Art project). Besides the exhibitions and the archive, the gallery offers symposiums, activities and educational workshops around topics such as art but also sensitive issues such as the role of women or children at risk.

Umm el-Fahm, the biggest Arab city in Israel, is known for its conservative Islam but Said Abu Shakran says that he does not have any problems with anybody in the town. None of the exhibitions shows nudity and the gallery invites the town's religious leaders to its exhibition openings.

In 2010, the Palestinian artist Ahmad Canaan and the Jewish Israeli entrepreneurs Amir Neuman Ahuvia and Yair Rothman established the Jaffa Art Salon. First planned as a contemporary exhibition and hosted by the Tel Aviv-Yafo Municipality, it proved to be immensely popular and was turned into an established gallery. The gallery is located in an old warehouse in the Jaffa port. From 2010 to 2011, the gallery hosted shows from various Palestinian artists from within the Israeli territory and from beyond the Greenline and from Gaza. Since 2012, the Art Salon opened it shows featuring both Jewish Israeli and Arab artists.

In 2024, during the Gaza war, the Palestinian Museum hosted and organised a display of 300 artworks by artists from Gaza, some of whom had been killed during the war. It was titled "This is Not an Exhibition".

=== Exhibitions of Palestinian Artists in territories beyond the Middle East ===
- 'Made in Palestine', Station Museum, Houston (May–October 2003)
- 'Occupied Space – Art for Palestine', Gallery27, London (15–20 May 2006)
- Occupied Space 2008 - Art for Palestine, The Mosaic Rooms, London (31 October–15 November 2008)
- 'Jumana Emil Abboud', BALTIC Centre for Contemporary Art, Gateshead (May–October 2016)
- 'Fragments of Palestine', P21 Gallery, London (15–23 March 2024)
- 'DNA : A Code of Life and Identity', ArtZone Palestine ( 14.11.2024 - an ongoing art demonstration)

== Palestinian artists in the Arab world ==
Originating from the Palestinian culture that developed in refugee camps mainly in Syria, Lebanon and Jordan, Palestinian artists in the Arab world were among the first to put forward a vision of Palestinian contemporary art. As the Palestinian Authority became more central to Palestinian nationalism, their number and influence in the Palestinian art field has decreased, and diasporic Palestinian artists in Europe and the United States have become increasingly prominent.

One such artist whose works were exhibited in the Made in Palestine exhibit that toured the United States in 2005 is Mustafa Al-Hallaj. Born in 1938 in Jaffa in then Mandatory Palestine, Al-Hallaj is known throughout the Arab world, where he has been described as "Syria's most famous artist" and an "icon of contemporary Arab graphic arts." Al Hallaj died in 2002 in a fire at his home while trying to save his artwork. In Self-Portrait as God, the Devil, and Man, Al-Hallaj uses rows of overlapping images and intricate etchings that took 10 years to complete to present "an epic retelling of the history of Palestinians from the 11th century BC to the present."

Another of these artists is Juliana Seraphim, who was among the first waves of Palestinian refugees to be forcibly relocated to Beirut, Lebanon in 1952. After studying at the Lebanese Academy of Fine Arts, she gained acclaim for her paintings which were heavily influenced by the spiritualist and surrealist movements. She was a member of the Ras Beirut artists.

== Palestinian artists in the United States and in Europe ==
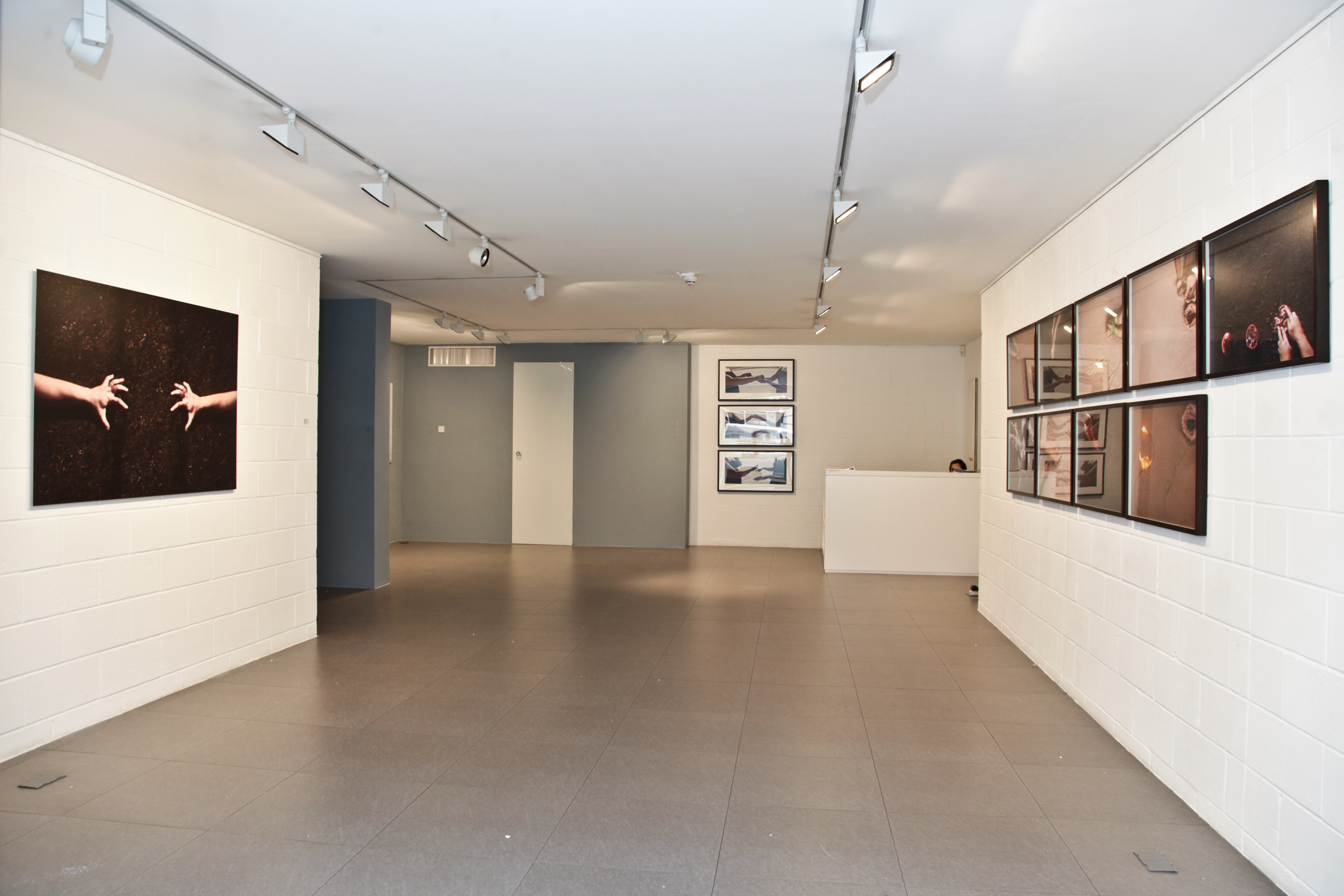
Sama Alshaibi's solo exhibition "Zero Sum Game" in London

A number of prominent Palestinian artists live and work outside of the Arab world, namely in the United States and in Europe. Notable among them are leading international conceptual artists Mona Hatoum, who is based in London, and Emily Jacir, who is based between New York and Ramallah. Prominent painters such as Jumana El Husseini, Kamal Boullata and Hani Zurob are based in France, while pioneering abstract painter Samia Halaby has resided in New York since the late 1970s. Rising new media artists Larissa Sansour (based in Denmark), Bissan Rafe (based in US and The Netherlands), and Sama Raena Alshaibi (based in US); have also become one of the recent new names in the Palestinian diaspora spotlight. Such artists have played a crucial role in developing and expanding contemporary Palestinian art by pushing for the acceptance of the Palestinian narrative in the mainstream art world despite apparent hostilities, controversies, and setbacks due to blatant censorship and various political contexts. While the subject of Palestine has remained paramount for such artists, especially in light of forced exiles, many in the diaspora have maintained cutting-edge approaches, gaining recognition for the new and innovative ways through which they approach Palestine's complex history, its current reality, and uncertain future.

== Collections ==
The Palestinian Art Court – Al Hoash, was founded in 2004, and opened its first gallery in East Jerusalem in 2005. Al Hoash Gallery has exhibited works of Hassan Hourani, Vera Tamari, Suleiman Mansour and others.

Darat Al Funun - The Khaled Shoman Foundation, was founded in 1988, with 6 locations in Amman today. Darat Al Funun created a platform for Palestinian and Arab artists to showcase their art and express themselves, exhibiting works of Suha Shoman, Adam Henein, Farid Belkahia, Emily Jacir, and many others.

The Hisham Khatib Collection was a project by the late Hisham Khatib, where he spent years collecting Palestinian and Arabic Paintings, Artifacts, Manuscripts, and many others, and published 7 books, including "Jerusalem, Palestine & Jordan: In the Archives of Hisham Khatib", “Valuable Printed Books and Manuscripts in the Khatib Collection”, “The Holy Land: Palestine and Egypt Under the Ottomans”, and others.

== Art market ==
In 2009, Steve Sabella researched the monetary value of Palestinian art from a fiscal point of view as part of his master thesis at Sotheby's Institute of Art in London. He analysed how Palestinian artists needed to get connected with cultural institutions and influential curators to achieve international recognition and art market success outside of Palestine. They became the mediators and the connecting link between the artists and the outside world.

According to the New York Times in 2013, collectors are reaching out for Palestinian art because prices were still comparably low ranging from $500 to $10,000. Yair Rothman, an Israeli art entrepreneur, was quoted that "prices have already tripled in the last three, four years, but there is still room for an increase."

== Notable artists ==
- Umayyah Juha
- Tayseer Barakat
- Issam Bader
- Taysir Batniji
- Abed Abdi
- Abu Saymeh
- Naji Al-Ali
- Kamal Boullata
- Nasr Abdel Aziz Eleyan
- Ibrahim Ghannam
- Mustafa Al-Hallaj
- Hasan Hourani
- Mona Hatoum
- Emily Jacir
- Sari Ibrahim Khoury
- Bissan Rafe
- Sliman Mansour
- Abdul Hay Mosallam
- Ismail Shammout
- Sharif Waked
- Hisham Zreiq
- Samia Halaby
- Jumana El Husseini
- Sama Raena Alshaibi
- Steve Sabella
- Marwan Isa
- Nabil Anani
- Abdelrahman al Muzain
- Khaled Hourani
- Hani Zurob
- Amer Shomali
- Tamam al Akhal
- Nicola al Saig
- New Visions
- Laila al Shawa
- Heba Zagout

== See also ==
- List of Palestinian artists
- List of Palestinian painters
- List of Palestinian women artists
