= Nidaa =

Nidaa is a feminine given name. Notable people with the name include:

- Nidaa Badwan (born 1987), Palestinian artist
- Nidaa Khoury (born 1959), Arab-Israeli poet and professor
