= Hani Zurob =

Palestinian artist (born 1976)

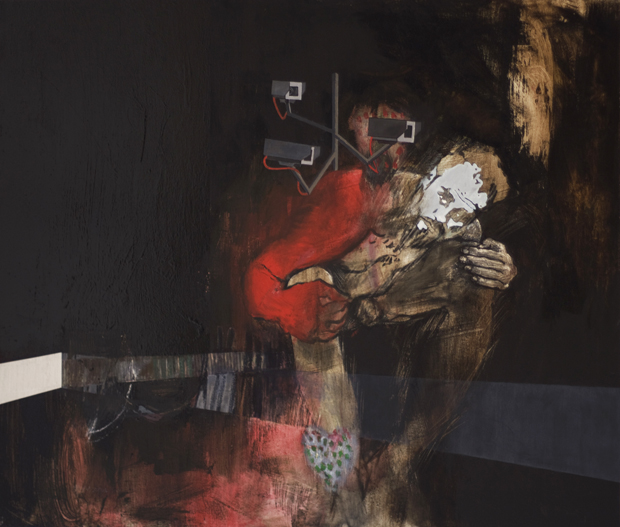
"Untitled" by Hani Zurob (2009), Acrylic and Tar on Canvas, 120 x 100 cm

Hani Zurob (Arabic: هاني زعرب; born 1976), is a Palestinian painter, based in Paris, France. His work addresses concepts of exile, waiting, movement and displacement, and aims to present the collective Palestinian experience through reflections on the personal.

His artwork has been exhibited at L'Institut du Monde Arabe in Paris, Bahrain National Museum, National Museum of Damascus in Syria, the Henry Moore Institute in the UK, the Station Museum of Contemporary Art in Houston, TX in the U.S and the 2014 Dakar Biennial. He was listed as one of The Huffington Post's "10 International Artists to Watch in 2013."

In 2012, Between Exits: Paintings by Hani Zurob authored by Kamal Boullata and published by Black Dog Publishing was released. It examines Zurob's work from 2002 to 2012 and sheds light on the personal and historical events that contextualize it. His life story has inspired the creation of two films directed by Jessica Habie, Mars At Sunrise and Meet Me Out of the Siege which won the "Best Short Documentary Prize" at the Cannes Short Film Corner in 2007.

== Early life and education ==
Hani Zurob was born on 30 August 1976 in Rafah Camp in the Gaza Strip. In 1994, Zurob moved from Rafah to Nablus and enrolled in the An-Najah National University where he received B.A. degree of fine arts in 1999. Due to Israeli restrictions on Palestinian movement he studied there as an "illegal sojourner" and lived under constant threat of deportation.

== Artist's exile ==
After graduation, Zurob moved to Ramallah in pursuit of a more active art and cultural scene and lived there from 1999 to 2006.

In 2002, Zurob was selected as one of ten finalists in the A. M. Qattan Foundation's Young Artist of the Year Award. During Operation Defensive Shield in 2002, Zurob was arrested by Israeli forces from his home while preparing for the exhibition. During the arrest the soldiers damaged the paintings he was working on. He was detained for 52 days in Ofer Prison west of Ramallah due to "confidential information". He was forced to sleep outside on asphalt with no bedding. As Amira Hass wrote, "But Zu'rob's talent has not always saved him. Tears flow from his eyes as he recalls the last minutes of the "interrogation" he underwent in May, 2002 ... Every so often he was taken for "interrogation". Tell me the names of your brothers and sisters, ordered the interrogator. He listed them. The interrogator said to him: You've forgotten someone. Zu'rob was confused. Whom had he forgotten? You forgot Rawan, said the interrogator, your sister's new daughter. Celebrations of births and weddings and sad occasions such as illness and death - participating in these family events is regularly denied to the Gazan "illegal sojourners" in the West Bank. So is it any wonder that Zu'rob forgot to mention his newborn niece to the interrogator, who had access to all the details concerning his subject on his computer screen?" Eventually, after the prosecution failed to put together an indictment against him, he was released. He informed the A. M. Qattan Foundation that he would no longer be able to participate because he would not be able to finish new work on time. They responded by giving him a two-month extension, and he created A Song: If I Say No, I Mean No in response to his experience in jail.

In 2006 he received a grant from the Cité internationale des arts in Paris to take part in a 6-month artist residency there. His return home to Ramallah was barred by an Israeli order, and he was subsequently informed that he would be arrested and imprisoned upon returning because he had previously lived illegally in the West Bank. Through the support of friends, colleagues and the Cité Internationale des Arts, Zurob was able to stay in Paris and eventually bring his wife there as well. In 2009 Zurob was awarded the Renoir Grant which included an eight-month residency in Essoyes, France. Zurob cannot return to his homeland and remains in exile. He is currently based in Paris, France.

== Awards ==
- Artist residency, Le Cube – Independent Art Room, Rabat, Morocco, 2013
- Artist residency, Municipality of la ville de Bobigny, France, 2011
- Artist residency, Municipality of Paris, Cité Internationale des Arts, Paris, France, 2010
- La bourse Renoir, Essoyes, France, 2009
- Artist residency, Maison de la Vigne, Salle Renoir, Essoyes, France, 2009
- Artist residency, Cité Internationale des Arts, Paris, France, 2009
- Grand Prize of the International Salon of Contemporary Art, Bourges, France, 2008
- Artist residency, Welfare Association, Atelier Palestine à la Cité Internationale des Arts, Paris, France, 2006
- Grant supporting exhibition, Khalil Sakakini Centre, Ramallah, Palestine, 2006
- Young Artist of the Year Award, one of ten selected artists, A.M. Qattan Foundation, Ramallah, Palestine, 2002

== Monograph - Between Exits: Paintings by Hani Zurob ==
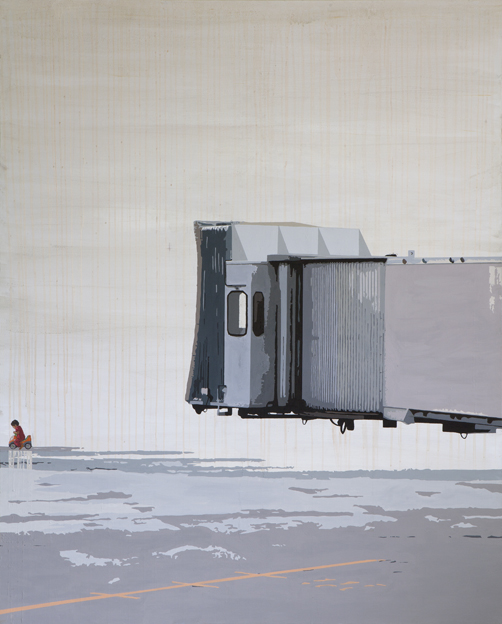
Hani Zurob's Flying Lesson #4 (2010), Acrylic and Pigments on Canvas, 200 x 160 cm - featured on the cover of Between Exits: Paintings by Hani Zurob

Between Exits: Paintings by Hani Zurob is the first monograph on the work of Hani Zurob from 2002–2012. It was published in 2012 by Black Dog Publishing. Author Kamal Boullata presents the chronological development of Zurob's work alongside the personal and political histories that influenced it, and Jean Fischer provided the introduction. "Hani's practice provides an important voice in contemporary Palestinian Culture, as well as a significant contribution to the creation of an Arab Aesthetic. Ultimately though, while Zurob's Art gives powerful expression to the Palestinian collective experience, it can also be seen in the context of more universal themes of personal identity and embraces humanity beyond the Palestinian context," wrote Black Dog Publishing.

== Artworks ==
=== Flying Lessons & Waiting series (2009–2014) ===
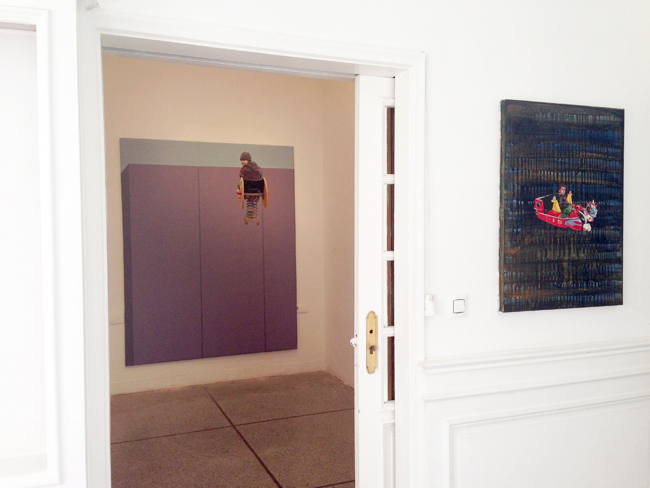
Hani Zurob's Flying Lesson #12 (2013) & Flying Lesson #11 (2013) exhibited at Le Cube in Rabat, Morocco

In reference to the work, Zurob stated, "Through the use of oil and acrylic paint and other mediums, I try to create a world which is composed of three worlds: exile where the artist lives (the father), and who appears in the paintings as the sole living human being by the depiction of the son who is portrayed in a relatively small scale in contrast to his surroundings. The second world concerns Qoudsi himself, as he visually appears and in his manner of showing his feelings through the use of his toys and his interactions with them. The third world is one of space, where we come from, which is depicted through walls, and multilayered backgrounds, as symbolic traces of the complex life that does not enable Qoudsi and me to meet. Yet, it is in my construction of a virtual world where a space for such a meeting occurs."

Qoudsi is the prominent figure in both of the series Flying Lessons and Waiting. As Annie-Rose Harrison-Dunn wrote in her review, "...He paints a space where the two can talk about these problems and try to find a solution. In this walled, liminal space Qoudsi sits with his toys- notably all forms of transport- waiting for his dad just as he waits in Jerusalem. At first glance these paintings appear sort of sad- a lost boy alone with his toys in no mans land- but Zurob prefers instead for them to be seen in terms of a sense of working through wrongs and gathering strength of conviction by generation. Hani Zurob tells his story through his paintings; Qoudsi now begins to develop his own form of articulation, who knows what he will eventually say and how loudly he will say it. "It's like a kind of heritage," says Zurob."

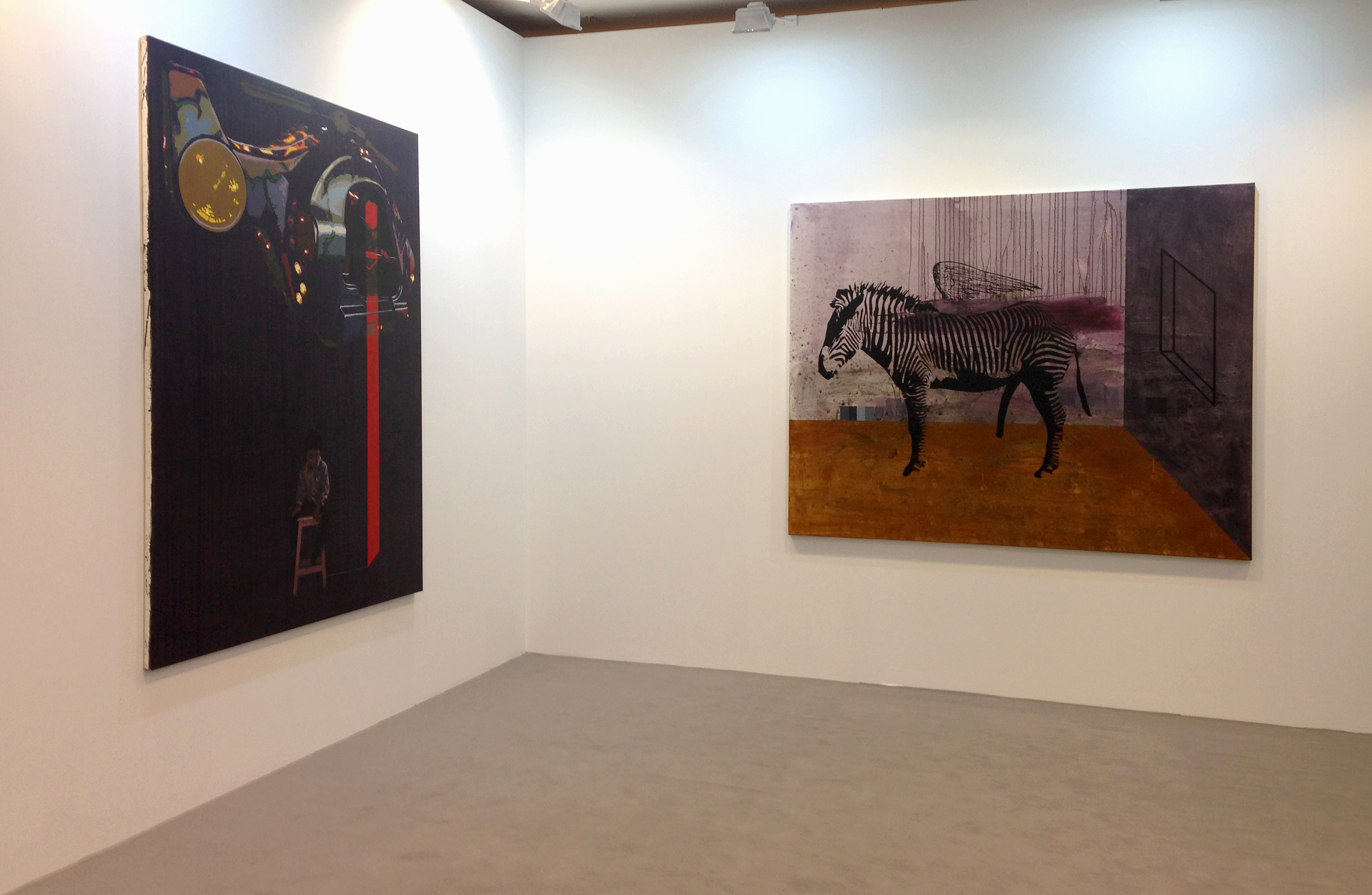
Hani Zurob's "Flying Lesson #08" (2011) and "Excuse me Lucian Freud: This is the Painter's Room" (2013) at ArtInternational Istanbul 2014

=== Heritage (2009) ===
This piece is a collision of the positive memories Zurob has of days during childhood spent on the beach with his family, layered with a photograph of his son's first time seeing the sea and fear of it.

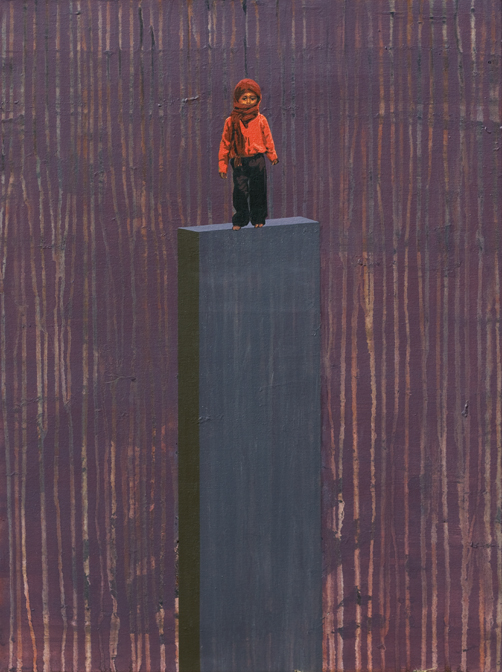
Hani Zurob's Waiting #6 (2011), Acrylic and Pigments on Canvas, 81 x 60 cm

=== Standby series (2007–2008) ===
Zurob's statement about this series reads, "'Standby' is a term that may cross the minds of a few people quickly, or if worse comes to the worst, for the unluckiest, "Standby" may represent just a few hours of "transit" or "an outstanding situation" in some airport or another; actually, in my personal situation, "Standby" goes beyond the simple geographical or linguistic criteria to refer explicitly to the whole Palestinian people who have been placed under such a situation for nearly sixty years now, i.e. since 1948!" These ideas were expanded upon in a monograph review in Harper's Bazaar Art Arabia, "In his mixed media "Standby" series, marking the 60th year of Israeli occupation, Zurob's disjointed bodies represent time far beyond just several hours in an airport – this is a temporary situation that has become permanent."

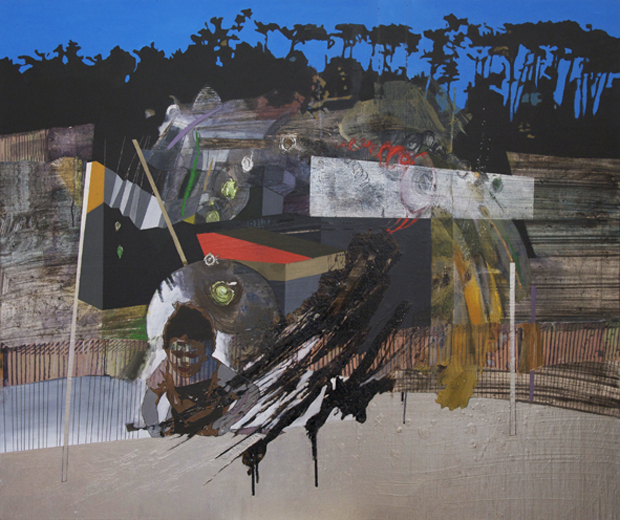
"Heritage" by Hani Zurob (2009), Acrylic, Oil, Pigments and Tar on Canvas, 120 x 100 cm

=== Projections series (2008) ===
As Jean Fischer states, " And yet, it is also "sensation" that accounts for Hani's occasional turn to painterly abstraction: the more abstract Barrage and Projection series, coincide with periods of deepening violence against the Gazan population, as if any form of naturalistic depiction would be inadequate to convey the artist's feelings. Altogether despite their cultural and temporal distance, there is much in the author's [Boullata's] analysis of Hani's work that recalls Bacon's preference for poetry as a primary source of inspiration as well as his own artistic responses to an earlier violent (European) reality. For both artists the photograph is a central tool towards restaging a disassembled human form, reassembled in delineated frames or in the minimal outline of rooms, which function as fragile, often restrictive armatures for the body in space, but always, as Bacon said, as a "recording of being in the world"."

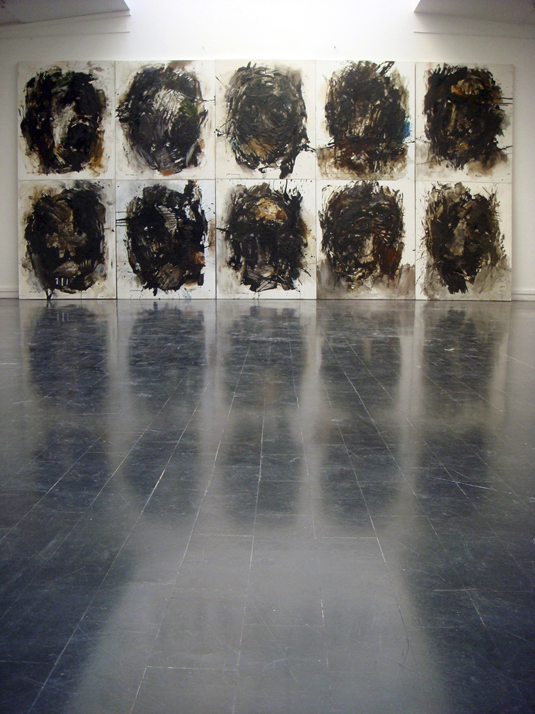
Hani Zurob's Standby exhibition at Gallery Crous Beaux-Arts in Paris (2008)

=== Marbles' War series (2007) ===
"His 2007 "Marbles" War' series (mixed media, acrylic, pigment and tar on canvas) is an exercise in self-criticism. The marbles refer to the game he played with friends during his childhood at the time of the first Intifada, but also to the various war games these same children are now playing as adults – now, marbles are no longer an innocent game, " wrote Harper's Bazaar Art Arabia.

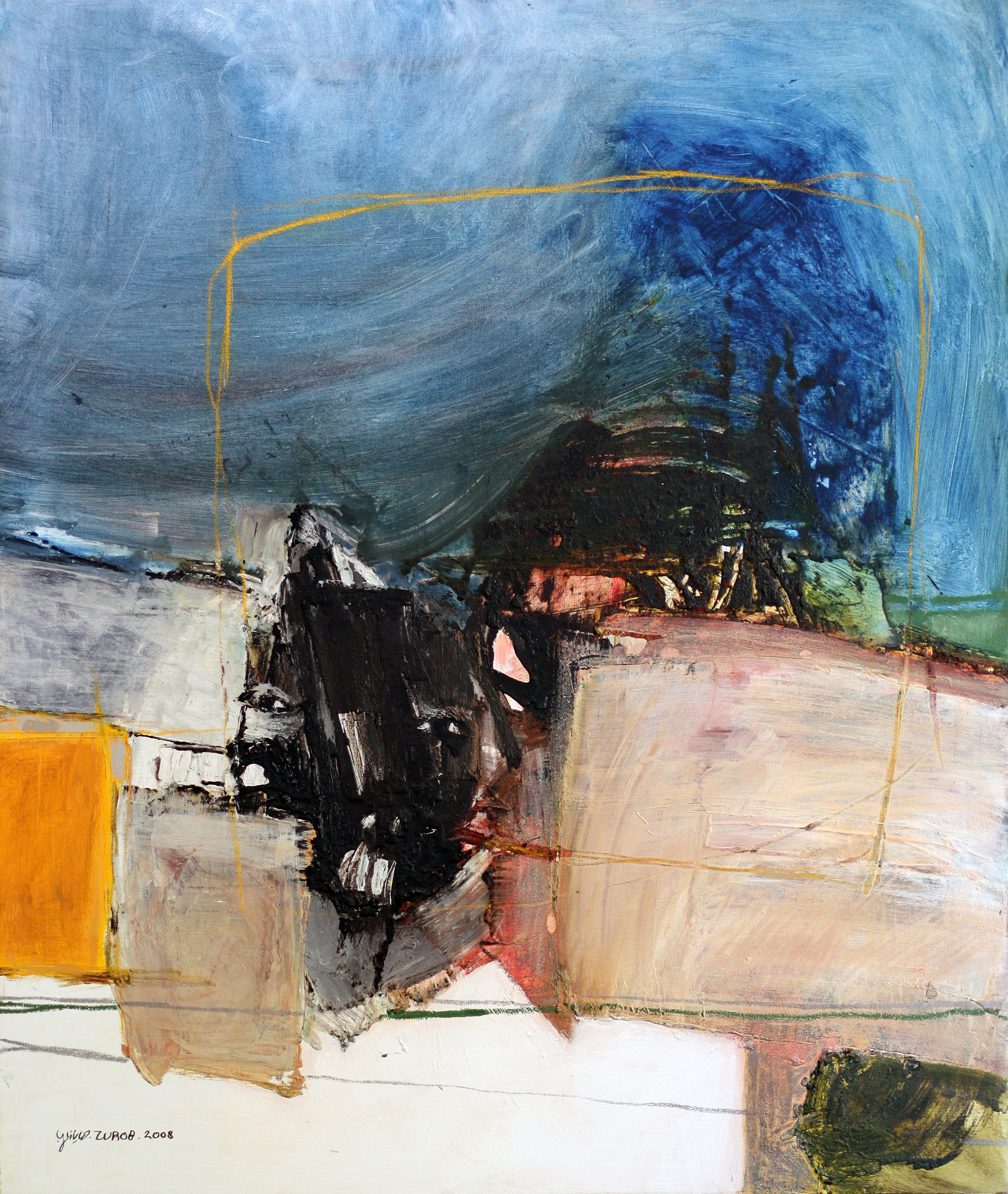
Hani Zurob's "Projections #10" (2008), Acrylic, Oil, Pigments and Tar on Canvas, 120 x 100 cm

=== Barrage series (2006) ===
Barrage is a body of work made immediately after Zurob discovered that he would not be allowed to return home and would need to live in exile in Paris. As Boullata explained, "While he had been intermittently feeling torn between figurative and abstract modes of expression, this time, he was absolutely certain that no painting language could express the intensity and immediacy of his anguish more forcefully than a painterly mode of abstraction for which free-flowing gestural brushstrokes might organically embody the emotional torrents of the day."

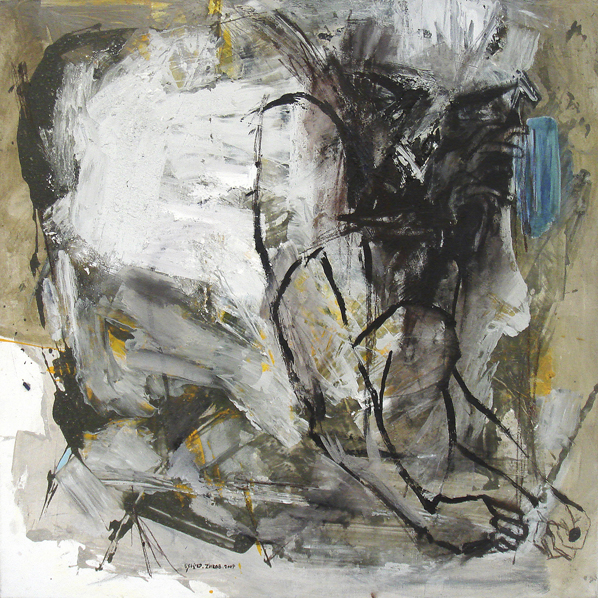
"Marbles' War #1" by Hani Zurob (2007), Mixed Media on Canvas, 100 x 100 cm

=== Exit series (2006) ===
Exit is one of the first bodies of work Zurob made in Paris during his residency at Cité Internationale des Arts. These paintings incorporate collage, featuring traces of life in his new city - telephone calling cards, receipts and gauze. As Zurob commented, "In Ramallah, the fish thinks it swims in an ocean, just to discover later that the ocean was only a barrel. You know what a real ocean is when you live in one. In Paris, I was shocked and liberated at the same time." Steve Sabella writes, "Hani Zurob, one of the most significant painters of the new generation of Palestinian artists to emerge in the last decade, expresses, 'the best thing that happened to my art was the moment when I arrived in Paris because what I learnt in the last four years might have taken me a lifetime back in Palestine.'"

=== Siege series (2004–2006) ===
As Mahmoud Hashhash wrote in the Le Monde Diplomatique, "The reds, yellows and blues are pure and vibrant and the lines are strong, so that the painting appears imbued with a dramatic energy. The presence of the contorted figure in the painting points to a psychological echo of the physical representations of the siege. The figure has clearly been permanently transformed, because of the severe and inhumane conditions it has had to endure.

== Public collections ==
- Yvette & Mazen Qupty Collections of the Palestinian Art Court - Al Hoash, Jerusalem
- Association Renoir, Essoyes, France
- Arab American National Museum (AANM) Permanent Collection, Dearborn, Michigan, USA
- Barjeel Art Foundation, Sharjah, United Arab Emirates
- Bank of Palestine Museum, Bethlehem, Palestine

== Bibliography ==
- Insoumission, Internationale Exhibition Catalog, Musée de la Palmeraie, Marrakech, 2014
- 11th Edition of Biennale of Dak'Art 2014 (11e biennale de l'art africain Contemporain), Exhibition Catalogue, 2014.
- Between Exits: Paintings by Hani Zurob By Kamal Boullata. London: Black Dog Publishing, 2012.
- Disposition Edited by Adania Shibli. Jerusalem: The A.M. Qattan Foundation, French Consulate General Jerusalem, Ministry of Culture, and the Welfare Association, 2012.
- Comme Un Souffle De Liberté Exhibition Catalogue edited by Fête de L'Humanité. Paris: Fête de L'Humanité and Galerie Talmart, 2012.
- Le Corps découvert Exhibition Catalogue edited by Hoda Makram-Ebeid. Paris: Institut du Monde Arabe - IMA, 2012.
- Diversity from the Arab World Exhibition Catalogue edited by Hayfa Aljishi. Bahrain: Albareh Art Gallery, 2012.
- Framed/Unframed Exhibition Catalogue edited by Vera Tamari and Inass Yassin. Ramallah: Birzeit University Museum, 2012.
- Art Dubai Contemporary 2011 Art Fair Catalogue. Dubai: Art Dubai, 2011.
- Palestine, La création dans tous ses états Exhibition Catalogue curated by Mona Khazindar and Djamila Chakour. Bahrain: National Museum of Bahrain, 2011.
- Palestinian Art - from 1850 to the present By Kamal Boullata. London: Saqi Books, 2009.
- 11th Edition of the Biennale of Cairo Exhibition Catalogue. Cairo: the Biennial of Cairo, 2008.
- Paris, Damas: regards croisés Exhibition Catalogue edited by Europia Productions. Paris: Europia Productions, 2008.
- Salon d'automne edition 2007 Exhibition Catalogue. Paris: Salon d'automne, 2007.
- July 2006 Exhibition Catalogue. Paris: Europia Productions, 2006.
- Siege Exhibition Catalogue. Ramallah: Khalil Sakakini Center and the A.M. Qattan Foundation, 2006.
- Visit Palestine: A Voyage Through Contemporary Art Exhibition Catalogue. Amman: 4 Walls Gallery, 2005.
- Colors of Life and Liberty, International Exhibition of Contemporary Palestinian Art Exhibition Catalog. Paris: The Palestinian Association for Contemporary Art and UNESCO, 2004.
- Made in Palestine Exhibition Catalogue by James Harithas. Houston: Ineri Publishing and Station Muse, 2003.
- Hope and the Aesthetic Moment Exhibition Catalogue. Young Artist of the Year Award. Ramallah: A.M. Qattan Foundation, 2002.

== Reviews ==
- "The Last Word - Cultural Buzz." By Sani P. Meo. This Week In Palestine Magazine, Issue 192, pp. 98, April 2014.
- "Hani Zurob - Book from the world of Art." By Diana Abouali. Sanat Dunyamiz Magazine (Turkish), Number 139, pp. 110–115, March 2014.
- "Between Exits: Paintings By Hani Zurob." By Richard M. Sanchez. The Art Book Review, October 21, 2013.
- "The Map is Not the Territory - A Five-Year Travelling Art Exhibition." Islamic Arts Magazine, August 23, 2013.
- "Between Exits: Paintings By Hani Zurob." By Maymanah Farhat. Jadalliyya, July 3, 2013.
- "Hani Zurob: Art Without Borders." By Annie-Rose Harrison-Dunn. Gloobi, June 27, 2013.
- "Hani Zurob: an Abstract Painter Rooted in Palestine's Reality." By Sarah Irving. The Electronic Intifada, June 17, 2013.
- "Biography and Art Criticism Reconciled." By India Stoughton. The Daily Star, April 12, 2013.
- "Ten International Artists to Watch 2013." By Katherine Brooks. The Huffington Post, January 2, 2013.
- "Hani Zurob's "Between Exits" Shows Palestine From An Exile's Point Of View." By Katherine Brooks. The Huffington Post, December 18, 2012.
- "Resilience and Light." By Michelle Davis. Reorient, May 13, 2013.
- "Adania Shibli: A Decade of Palestinian Artists in Paris." By Mustafa Mustafa. Alakhbar Newspaper, Feb 23, 2013.
- "Book: Between Exits, Paintings by Hani Zurob." By Olivia Snaije. Harper's Bazaar Art Magazine, Issue 4, pp. 139, Autumn 2012.
- "Hani Zurob: Résidence d'exil." Balbymix Number 5 - Culture Magnétique - Ville de Bobigny (French), pp. 8, September 2012 - February 2013.
- "Hani Zurob: L'exil et la demeure." By Constance Desloire. Jeune Afrique Magazine (French), Issue 2680, pp. 64–65, May 20–26, 2012.
- "Corps Souffrants." Connaissance des Arts Magazine H. S. (French), Issue 528, pp. 22–23, April 4–10, 2012.
- "Les cris du corps." By Annick Colonna-Césari. L'express Magazine (French), Issue 3170, pp. 140–141, April 4–10, 2012.
- "Exhibition of the Month: Contemplations." By Mirna Bamieh. This Week In Palestine Magazine, Issue 166, pp. 66–67, February, 2012.
- "Reconsidering The Value Of Palestinian Art & Its Journey Into The Art Market, Part 2." By Steve Sabella. Contemporary Practices Journal, Volume 8, pp. 96–113, 2011.
- "Reconsidering The Value Of Palestinian Art & Its Journey Into The Art Market, Part 1." By Steve Sabella. Contemporary Practices Journal, Volume 7, pp. 80–100, 2010.
- "Hani Zurob: The Painting as Real." By Adania Shibli. Contemporary Practices Journal, Volume 6, pp. 32–34, 2010.
- "Le lauréat, Hani Zurob, redécouvre la couleur." By Sylvie Virey. Liberation Champagne Newspaper, Issue 22378, February 25, 2010.
- "From the Crucible of Struggle." By Kamal Boullata. International Gallerie Journal, Issue 25, Volume 12, Number 2, pp. 16–17, December, 2009.
- "La Force militante de l'art Palstinien." By Romain Blondeau. Le Monde Newspaper (French), August 4, 2009.
- "La Palestine à L'institut Du Monde Arabe: La politique du retrait." By Sarah Ilher-Meyer, Zérodeux (French), 2009.
- "Lots of variation in Palestinian art exhibition." By Robert Kluijver. The Power of Culture, October 2009.
- "Palestine Exhibition in Paris - Review of the Exhibition: «Palestine, la création dans tous ses états»." By Robert Kluijver. Robertk.Asia, September 10, 2009.
- "Exposition: L'art de la Guerre." By Nicolas Michel. Jeune Afrique Magazine, Issue 2528, June 21–27, 2009.
- "Artist of the month, Hani Zurob." This Week In Palestine Journal, Issue 137, pp. 68, September, 2009.
- "Zurob Wins Renoir Prize." By Noury Al-Jarah. Alrai Newspaper (Arabic), July 8, 2009.
- "Hani Zurob, Standby." By Najwan Darwish. Al-Akhbar Newspaper (Arabic), Issue Number, July 5, 2008.
- "Quest for a Palestinian Museum." By Michael Z. Wise. Los Angeles Times, July 1, 2007.
- "Der Untergrundmaler." By Joliana Von Mittelstaedt. Financial Times Deutschland Journal, Weekend Edition, pp. 6–7, March 10, 2006.
- "Hani Zurob: Expressing the Closure of Thought." By Amira Hass. Haaretz Newspaper, January 9, 2006.
- "Hani Zurob: On the Path to the Abstract." By Mahmoud Abu Hashhash. Le Monde Diplomatique Journal, February, 2006.

== See also ==
- Kamal Boullata
- Black Dog Publishing
- Institut du Monde Arabe
- Bahrain National Museum
- A. M. Qattan Foundation
- Arab American National Museum
- Pierre-Auguste Renoir
- Ahmed Khoswan
- Palestinian art
