= Arab American National Museum =

Museum in Dearborn, Michigan, United States

- المتحف الوطني العربي الأمريكي

- The Arab American National Museum in 2022
- Established: May 5, 2005; 21 years ago
- Location: 13624 Michigan Ave; Dearborn, MI 48126
- Coordinates: 42.322147°N 83.176603°W
- Director: Diana Abouali
- Website: arabamericanmuseum.org

The Arab American National Museum (AANM, Arabic: المتحف الوطني العربي الأمريكي) is a museum in Dearborn, Michigan, highlighting the history, experiences, and contributions of Arab Americans. Established in 2005, it is the first, and largest, museum in the world devoted to Arab American history and culture. It is a division of the Arab Community Center for Economic and Social Services (ACCESS), and a Smithsonian Affiliate.

== History ==
The museum's roots lie in an arts and culture division established by parent organization ACCESS in the 1980s. A small museum soon opened in the organization's headquarters, but by the late 1990s, they sought to establish a larger, standalone museum; as such, a fundraising campaign was launched in 2000 to fund the construction of a new museum. Following the September 11 attacks, the community saw a more urgent need to tell their story and dispel myths about Arab Americans.

The museum, located on Michigan Avenue in Dearborn's East Downtown, opened to the public on May 5, 2005. Construction cost $15 million, funded largely by donations; major donors included Chrysler, General Motors, the Rockefeller Foundation, and the governments of Saudi Arabia and Qatar.

In February 2019, the leader of ACCESS announced Diana Abouali as the new director of the AANM.

== Exhibits ==
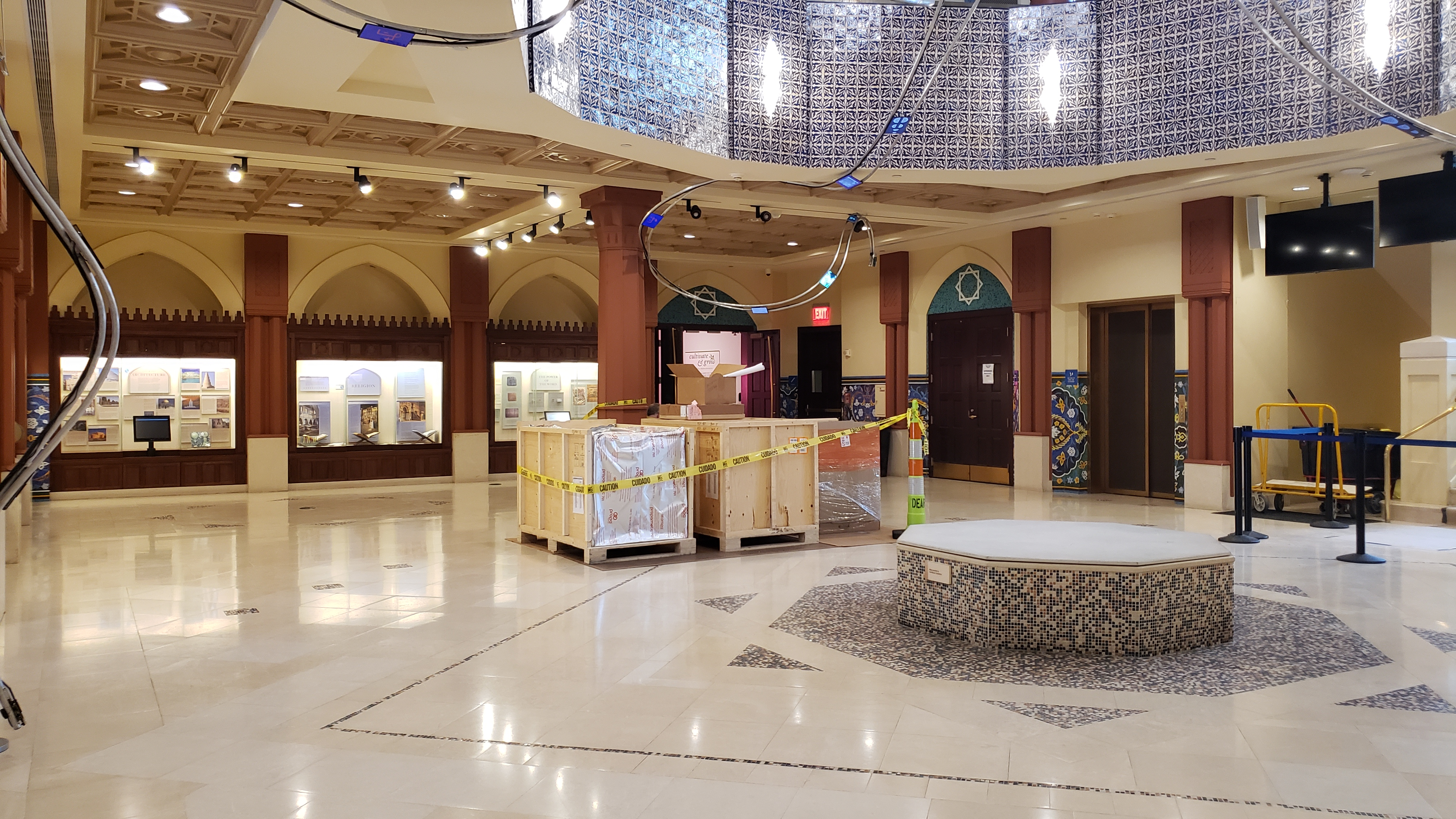
First floor gallery

The museum's first floor explores the history and contributions of ancient Arab civilization such as science, medicine, mathematics, architecture, and the decorative arts. The second floor focuses on the Arab experience in America, with galleries dedicated to migration, everyday life and culture, and prominent Arab-Americans such as Ralph Nader and Helen Thomas. Documents and artifacts from Arab Americans related to immigration and the immigration process are displayed, and stories of Arab Americans are portrayed in video or audio recordings.

The AANM also includes two large gallery spaces for temporary art exhibits.

=== Permanent art collection ===
Complementing its regular lineup of solo and group exhibitions of art from the Arab world and its American diaspora, the museum holds a permanent collection of paintings, drawings, sculpture, photography, and installation art, displayed throughout the museum. Artists represented in this collection include Emily Jacir, Julienne Jabara Johnson, Mary Tuma, Sama Alshaibi, Hani Zurob, Helen Zughaib, John Halaka, Samia Halaby, Kamal Boullata, Doris Bittar, Sumayyah Samaha, Afaf Zurayk, Leila Kubba Kawash, Athir Shayota, Wafer Shayota, and Adnan Charara.

== Programs and events ==
MOVE is a first-of-its-kind national gathering that provides a space for artists, activists, scholars, philanthropists, organizations and others from the Arab American community to connect, learn and exchange ideas. MOVE 2017, produced by ACCESS and its three national institutions – the Arab American National Museum, the National Network for Arab American Communities (NNAAC) and the Center for Arab American Philanthropy (CAAP) – will Mobilize, Organize, Vocalize, and Empower attendees as they explore intersectionality in a safe environment and have critical conversations about a wide range of issues impacting Arab Americans. DIWAN: A Forum for the Arts is now a part of MOVE. DIWAN unites Arab American artists, scholars and performers representing myriad academic fields and artistic genres for a weekend dialogue that reinforces the AANM's commitment to providing a place for community members and artists to meet, exchange ideas and exhibit their work. Notable presenters at the 2009 DIWAN conference include writer Najla Said, poet Suheir Hammad, artist Wafaa Bilal, and poet Remi Kanazi.

Global Fridays is a periodic music program at the AANM that promotes World Music. Though Global Fridays is held at the Arab American National Museum the music is a diverse mix from Mexican American roots music to Chinese Classical and Rock.

Arab Film Festival is an annual film festival put on by the AANM that showcases a number of Arab and Arab American films over a weekend. Past festivals have celebrated the career of a particular Arab filmmaker or director. The 2008 Arab Film Festival honored the work of Egyptian film director Youssef Chahine and showed his films The Cairo Station and The Destiny. The festival also features short films such as Kemo Sabe the story of Yussef, a six-year-old Arab-American boy who dreams of being the Cowboy instead of the Indian on the playground.

The Arab American Book Award was established in 2006 to celebrate and support the research of and the written work of Arab Americans and their culture. The Arab American Book Award encourages the publication and excellence of books that preserve and advance the understanding, knowledge, and resources of the Arab American community by celebrating the thoughts and lives of Arab Americans. The purpose of the Award is to inspire authors, educate readers and foster a respect and understanding of the Arab American culture.
