= Sharif Waked =

- شريف واكد
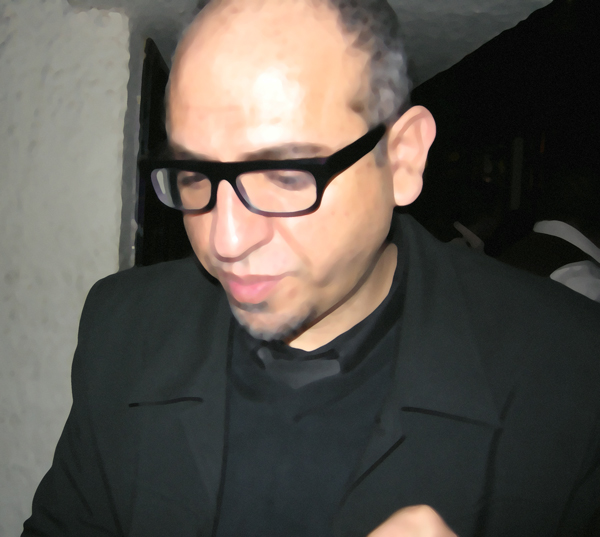
- Born: 1964 (age 61–62); Nazareth, Israel
- Occupation: Visual artist

Sharif Waked (Arabic: شريف واكد; born 1964) is a Palestinian visual artist.

== Biography ==
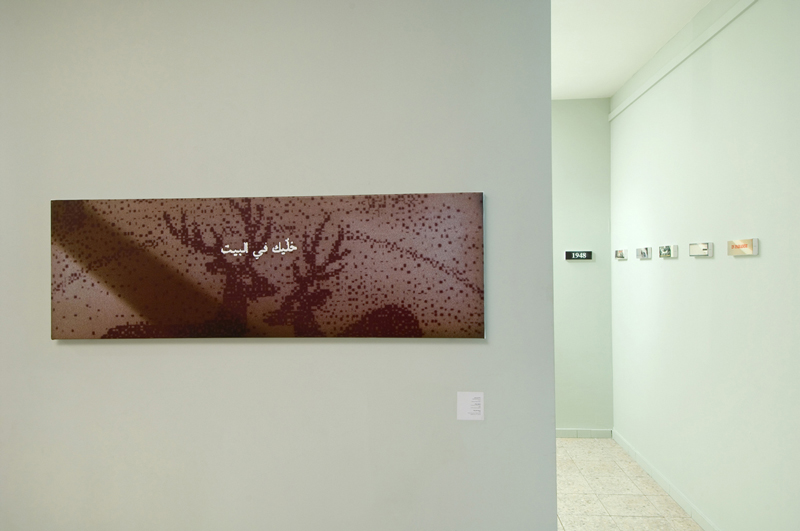
Melancholia (1998)

Sharif Waked was born in Nazareth to a Palestinian refugee family from Mjedil, a depopulated Palestinian village. He lives and works in Haifa and Nazareth. In 1983-1986, he studied art and philosophy at Haifa University.

== Art career ==
Waked’s work is part of the permanent collections of the Solomon R. Guggenheim Museum (NY), Sharjah Art Foundation (UAE), Fondation Louis-Vuitton pour la création (Paris), Israel Museum Jerusalem, Queensland Art Gallery, South Brisbane, Australia, and the Barjeel Art Foundation (UAE). In her critique of Waked's painting "Melancholia," Naomi Aviv writes: "Waked juxtaposes slivers of sayings and fragments of images drawn from the reservoirs of memory. The sentence and the image are stitched together with computer processing, which is photographed from the screen, printed and scanned, and the process is then repeated. The act of photographing captures also the flash of light that is reflected as a darkish beam on the computer screen and becomes an integral part of the picture, endowing it with a dramatic effect. The invasive beam of light has an aesthetic value, but also the troubling and subversive presence of a foreign element: as though someone is trying to illuminate the art work with a flashlight in order to ferret in its innards; as though the art work itself is suspected of subversion."

== Awards and recognition ==
- 2007 - Ministry of Science, Culture and Sport
- Anderson Prize and Mark of Distinction, Israel Museum, Jerusalem, for children's book illustration, "A Child Going Upstairs"

== See also ==
- Palestinian art
- Visual arts in Israel
