= Kamal Boullata =

Palestinian artist, art historian (1942–2019)

- Born: 1942; Jerusalem, Mandate Palestine
- Died: August 6, 2019 (aged 76–77); Berlin, Germany
- Education: Fine Arts Academy, Rome; Corcoran School of Art
- Known for: Painting, silkscreen, art history
- Notable work: Palestinian Art: From 1850 to the Present
- Movement: Hurufiyya movement
- Spouse: Lily Farhoud

Kamal Boullata (Arabic: كمال بلاطة;1942 − August 6, 2019) was a Palestinian artist and art historian. He worked primarily with acrylic and silkscreen. His work was abstract in style, focusing on the ideas of division in Palestinian identity and separation from homeland. He expressed these ideas through geometric forms as well as through the integration of Arabic words and calligraphy.

== Biography ==
Kamal Boullata was born to mother Barbara Ibrahim Atalla and father Yusuf Isa Boullata in the Christian Quarter of Jerusalem in 1942 shortly before the partition of Palestine and Israel. He had five older siblings by the names of Isa, Renée, André, Jamil, and Su‘ad. He attended elementary school at the Collège des Frères and secondary school at the St. George's School. His first encounters with painted works were Byzantine icons. Later in his childhood, Boullata recalls sitting for hours on end as a small boy in front of the Dome of the Rock, engrossed in sketching its innumerable and unfathomable geometric patterns and calligraphic engravings. In “Palestinian Art: From 1850 to Present,” Boullata recounts his first teacher, Khalil Halabi, who taught him as a young boy to trace these geometric patterns and script upon a grid. He was mesmerized by the convergence of image and word, stating that “the iconographer does not paint an icon he writes it.” In an interview he recalled "I keep reminding my self that Jerusalem is not behind me, it is constantly ahead of me."

Boullata studied at the Fine Arts Academy in Rome graduating in 1965. He enrolled in the graduate program at the Corcoran School of the Arts and Design in Washington, D.C., receiving an MFA in 1971. Boullata continued to live and create in Washington until 1974, at which time he traveled to Beirut for a short period and worked as art director of a pioneering publishing house. During his time in Beirut, Boullata became involved with a group of artist he termed the Ras Beirut artists, named after the neighborhood around which they worked. In 1993 and 1994 Boullata was awarded Fulbright Senior Scholarships to conduct research on Islamic art in Morocco. He worked and lived between Morocco and Paris during the later 1990s. Kamal Boullata was a fellow resident at The Wissenschaftskolleg zu Berlin (Institute for Advanced Study, Berlin). Boullata, whose work has been exhibited throughout Europe, the United States and the Middle East, continued to live and work in Spain, Menton, and eventually Berlin, where he unexpectedly died in 2019 of unknown causes.

He is buried on Mount Zion in Jerusalem at the Greek Orthodox cemetery.

== Works ==
Materials

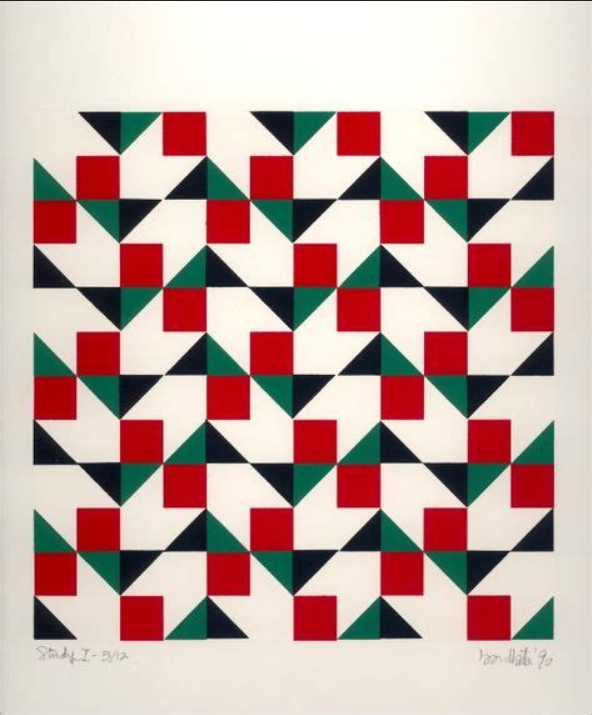
Homage to the Flag, 1990, silkscreen

Boullata worked mainly in silkscreen and acrylic. His compositions are often based on the angular Kufic script embedded in geometric designs, which he uses as a representational form of art. One of his later series of works, Addolcendo, used watercolor, gouache, and crayons. He employed the French pochoir technique to achieve crisp stenciled edges.

Subject matter

His choice of subject is primarily visually abstracted themes of Palestinian identity and the conditions of exile. He frequently has religious references in his work, citing the Bible and the Qur’an, and titling pieces “God,” “Iconostasis,” “Angelus,” and “Bilqis.” He described his fascination with the square as a formal and spiritual anchor that tied him back to Jerusalem. He described the square as the “root” of his “new language” attributing its various reconfigurations to ancient forms of mathematics. This tied to his fascination with the eight pointed star. He was interested in this geometric form not just in Islamic art history, but also in the mandorlas surrounding the figure of Christ in traditional icons. Due to his use of Arabic calligraphy as a graphic form, he has been as part of the Hurufiyya Art Movement.

As Boullata wrote in an article titled To Measure Jerusalem: Explorations of the Square:

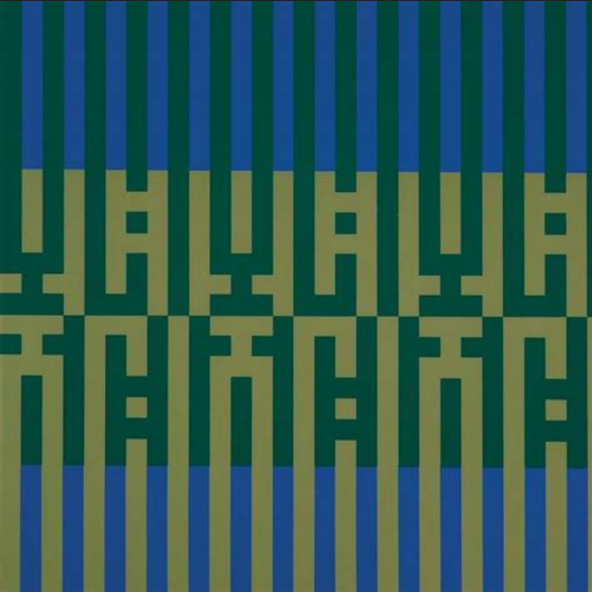
There is no i but i, 1983, silkscreen

“Once I saw the link between the central motif in the icons of my childhood and the octagonal star from which radiated those mesmerizing arabesques evolved in Islamic art, I realized why all three monuments I could see from our roof in Jerusalem shared a common building plan. By circumscribing the intersection of two squares within a circle, the earliest ground plan of the Basilica of the Resurrection, the Church of the Ascension and the Dome of the Rock all sought to mark the divide between heaven and earth.”

Presentation and multimedia work

Boullata’s 1994 publication of the twelve silkscreen prints Three Quartets (Opus 1-12) was accompanied by a poem written by Mohammed Bennis. His 1995 series Twelve Lanterns for Granada was inspired by the Syrian poet Adonis, and took the shape of a sculpted and illustrated book. This relationship between color, shape, and language is important in his work.

== Publications ==
Boullata wrote poetry and exhibit reviews, and studied and wrote about art history, art theory, and Palestinian arts. He was published often by the Journal of Palestine Studies (JPS). He has written introductions and exhibit reviews for other artists such as Sophie Halaby, Steve Sabella, and ‘Asim Abu Shaqra.

One of Boullata’s most highly regarded books is Palestinian Art: From 1850 to the Present. It is broken into four parts, Part 1: From Religious to Secular Painting, Part 2: Memory and Resistance, Part 3: Art from the Ghetto, and Part 4: The Evocation of Place. This work represents three decades of Boullata’s scholarly research on Palestinian art and is celebrated as the most comprehensive study on modern Palestinian art.

- Palestinian Art: From 1850 to the Present, Saqi Press, 2009, London (in English)
- There Where You Are Not: selected writings of Kamal Boullata, Hirmer, 2019 (in English)
- Uninterrupted Fugue: Art by Kamal Boullata edited with an introduction by Burcu Dogramaci, Hirmer, 2019 (in English)
- Belonging and Globalisation: Critical Essays in Contemporary Art and Culture, Saqi Press 2008, London. (in English)
- Recovery of Place: A Study of Contemporary Palestinian Art (in Arabic)
- Between Exits: Paintings by Hani Zurob Black Dog Publishing London 2012 (in English)

His contribution to the Palestinian encyclopedia covered the 1935-85 period. He divided the various roots of Palestinian artistic style and expression into four categories.

(1) Illustrative: romanticized images of the Palestinian struggle

(2) Narrative: folk-art representation of Palestinian life

(3) Surrealist: fantastic art inspired by the Egyptian surrealist movement

(4) Lyrical: not limited to poetic works

== Reviews ==
In a review of his work, Moroccan art critic Abdelkebir Khatibi wrote: “Elaborated with remarkable continuity and patience, Boullata's work is that of a surveyor, an artist of proportion and measurement. Behind this passion for geometry lies the tradition of icon-painting, which forged the beginnings of his artistic training, a tradition that has maintained a venerable continuity between Byzantium and the Arabo-Islamic civilization of the Middle East.”

Sultan Sooud Al Qassemi noted: "Kamal was simply a giant of art & culture of our age. Not only was Kamal an accomplished artist, he was also the author of what is perhaps the most important book on the subject of Modern and contemporary art from Palestine, titled: Palestinian Art: from 1850 to the Present."

The German art historian Hans Belting wrote that, “as a member of a Christian Arab family from Jerusalem, [Boullata] dreamed of a ‘marriage between Byzantium and Islam.’” Steve Sabella noted just after Boullata's death: "I had dinner with Kamal three weeks ago just before I left for Jerusalem, the city of our birth. He looked young, energised, inspired, speaking about many projects. From the moment we met in 2002, any conversation with Kamal ignited my imagination. Only beauty emerges when one delves into his art and listens to his carefully chosen words -words that I felt always came out from the heart. Kamal inspired thousands in his life, and I do feel his journey has just begun. Kamal's departure is not a loss, but a reward to all humanity."

== Collections ==
Public collections holding his art include:

- Arab American National Museum, Dearborn, Michigan
- British Museum, London
- Institut du Monde Arabe, Paris
- Jordan National Gallery
- Khalid Shoman Foundation
- Sharjah Art Museum
- Sarjah and the Bibliotheque Louis Notari, Monaco

== See also ==
- Islamic art
- Islamic calligraphy
