= Helen Zughaib =

American painter (b. 1959)

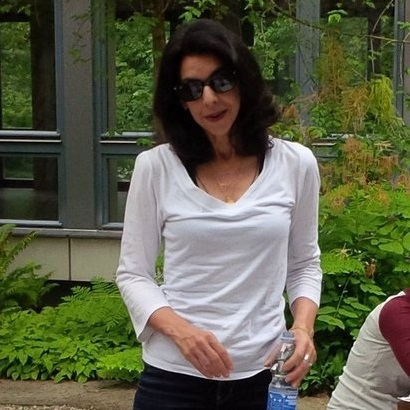
- Born: 1959 (age 66–67); Beirut, Lebanon
- Education: Syracuse University
- Parent: Elia Kamal Zughaib
- Website: https://www.hzughaib.com

Helen Zughaib (/zəˈɡeɪb/ zə-GAYB; born 1959) is an American painter and multimedia artist living and working in Washington, D.C. She was the daughter of a State Department civil servant. Her family left Lebanon in 1975 due to the outbreak of the Lebanese Civil War, and moved to Europe as a teenager, attending high school in Paris. She studied at Northeast London Polytechnic School of Art. She moved to the United States to study visual and performing arts at Syracuse University graduating in 1981 with her BFA. She first learned about gouache paints at SU and continues to use gouache as her primary medium, but also creates mixed media installations. Her themes are centered around hopefulness, healing, and spirituality, using visual arts to shape and foster positive ideas about the Middle East. She has served as cultural envoy to Palestine, Switzerland, and Saudi Arabia. She has also been selected for the 2021-2023 inaugural social practice residency by the John Kennedy Center in Washington D.C.

== Early life ==
=== Exodus story ===
Helen Zughaib left Lebanon in late December 1975. Helen and her siblings had not been going to school and a curfew was in place due to the ongoing civil war. They had been sleeping on the floor. One day, the concierge of the building went to her father and told him that he and his family needed to leave immediately. Two militias were preparing to have a shootout and the family flat on the second floor would have been in the crossfire. So the family left, leaving their cats behind, and ran through the streets after curfew while snipers were on the roofs of the surrounding buildings. While running, one of her sisters lost a shoe. The image of the shoe has haunted Helen and been incorporated in many of her works. Everyone in her family was evacuated to Greece but her father stayed behind in Lebanon. She had asked her father when they would be allowed to come back, and he said in a week. Instead of one week, Helen was unable to return to Lebanon for 35 years.

== Artworks ==
Zughaib illustrated Kaleel Sakakeeny's book "Laila's Wedding" published in 1994.

Zughaib's work has been purchased by the United States government to be given as gifts to foreign leaders. In 2009 Secretary of State Hillary Clinton gave Moroccan King Mohamed V Zughaib's interpretation of the Washington Monument during Clinton's trip to Morocco. In 2010 President Barack Obama presented Iraqi Prime Minister Nouri al-Maliki with Zughaib's painting "Midnight Prayers" during the Prime Minister's visit to the White House.

Her work has been included in Art in Embassies' State Department exhibitions abroad, including Brunei, Nicaragua, Mauritius Iraq, Belgium, Lebanon, Saudi Arabia and Sweden.

Zughaib's work comments on cultural identity, family life, the plight of refugees and displacement in the Middle East, the Arab Spring, and the Lebanese Civil War. Her notable series of 23 paintings titled "Stories My Father Told Me," for example, is based on the folks tales and family history that her Lebanese father has told her over the years, and includes numerous stories of migration and displacement. The complete series was shown at the Arab American National Museum in 2015.

Her 2019 "Syrian Migration Series" shown at the Jerusalem Fund Gallery in Washington, DC was inspired by Jacob Lawrence's 1940 "Migration Series."

Zughaib's style combines a variety of art historical references and influences including post-Impressionism and pop art with Islamic art motifs of geometric patterns and floral arabesque. Her work has been influenced by the styles of Pablo Picasso and Jacob Lawrence. Her work can be found in many notable collections, such as The White House, World Bank, Library of Congress, and the Arab American National Museum. She has had over 20 solo exhibitions in the U.S. and Middle East.

=== Circle Home (2010) ===
Circle Home/Beit is an ink on etching paper created by Zughaib in 2010. Shown at a show in Beirut 35 years after she had left, the piece highlights the theme of journey and represents the endless questioning of Zughaib of a possible return to home. She emphasizes that home is not only the physical structures in a community but also everything that defines the meaning of home. The cyclical nature of the work combines the past sentiments of sadness with future aspirations of return. While she calls this piece circle home, all of her Arab friends refer to the piece as beit. Beit means home in Arabic. Helen recalled her father explaining bait to her: "bait is not just the physical structure, it's the village. It's your extended family. It's your tribe. It's all these other elements that are meaning. It's much larger than the actual structure." She wrote the word repeatedly as a type of catharsis. Zughaib cites the significance of this piece to her personally, referencing how incessantly writing the same word over again left a pain in her hand that felt "strongly appropriate."

=== Map of Home ===
Map of home is gouache on board. Helen created this piece for her show in Lebanon. The blue represents the Mediterranean. The brown represents the mountains. She is wearing the hand of Fatima that her aunt gave her. Helen placed Lebanon over her head and heart. She put a star for her birthplace of Beirut. She is wearing a wedding band for her second cousin and she included her cat. She gave her cat a tail out of artistic license because her cat does not actually have a tail.

=== Pieces of You ===
In 2010, during her visit home, Helen visited Khaled and Aleppo. The homes there were known for their detailed tiles but were destroyed in the Arab Spring. She painted blank tiles based on the designs that you would have found on the old homes. Her idea was to show the fracturing and destruction that war brings upon civilization, citing her own journey from Lebanon through countries such as Jordan, Syria, and France. One aspect of the piece that Zughaib emphasizes is the fact that this is not limited to just the Lebanon crisis. For Zughaib, the art is also representative of situations in Afghanistan, Iraq, Syria, Ukraine, etc. due to its similarities.

=== Arab Spring ===
Arab Spring is a collection of gouache on board pieces. Helen was inspired by Pablo Picasso for these pieces. This collection can be found in the library of congress. She uses flowers and bright colors to display optimism and hope for equality.

=== Tinderbox (2013) ===
Tinderbox is made of gouache and newspaper. The newspaper included in this piece are clippings from articles written on the war in Syria with a blue background. There are many smaller clippings, but the most prominent pieces read "Tell me how this one ends,"The spark that ignited a REVOLUTION," and the piece's namesake "The Syrian Tinderbox."

=== Generations Lost ===
Generations Lost is gouache on board. The subject of the painting includes only women because women are the ones left behind. The men are either dead, lost or fighting the war. These individuals are holding faded photographs of their loved ones. Helen titled this piece "Generations Lost" because the effect of war is continuous even if the bombing has ended.

=== White Helmets ===
The white plastic construction helmets display is an ode to the volunteers who wore white helmets in the Syrian civil war. After a building was bombed, volunteers would don their white helmets and search the rubble for survivors. Many times, the opposing force could make out the white helmets and bomb the site a second time. Helen used her artwork to commemorate the heroism of average civilians during the civil war. The White Helmets began in Syria and were spearheaded by locals including barbers, grocers, shopkeepers, etc. After bombings, whether explosive or chemical, these White Helmets would go into the wreckage to try and find survivors and rescue anyone. The piece is also Zughaib's way of honoring these everyday people for their heroics and emphasizing the impact that they have and how it has reverberated to other conflicts such as Ukraine.

=== Eat the News ===
Eat the News is an installation in which Helen used enamel paint and newspaper on ceramic plates to force viewers to consume what happened in the Syrian civil war. Living in Washington D.C, Helen began to collect all references to the war found in the Washington Post. She recalled how, even though she would listen to and read the news, she was able to go about her daily business. At some point, all the death becomes "like just numbers and you can't even absorb it. Even me, when my heart is there, I can't even absorb it." She wanted to personalize the war so she began to write down the name of every man, woman, and child that had been killed in this war thus far. After filling five notebooks with names, she went to the streets to try and inform the public. She went to the post office, metro, salon, different stores, and the pharmacy and would ask strangers to take a picture of her writing down victim names. "I would take my phone and I would say to the person-they thought I was completely crazy-would you please take a picture while I'm writing this down. They're like why? And I would say well, while we're standing here buying peanut butter, this is what's going on." She realized her effort was not enough so she created a physical installation where individuals would be forced to consume what they are learning about in the news. The painted dots are meant to represent movement, journeys, hope, and dreams.

=== Syrian Migration Series ===
Helen's Syrian Migration Series is an ongoing series working to document the Syrian war through art. She was inspired by Jacob Lawerence's, the African American painter, 60 panel migration series about the movement of African Americans from the rural south to the industrialized north. This series is meant to also demonstrate the shared suffering of different peoples across time and place. The migration series documents the beginning of the Syrian war from revolution, to how it moved to Syria from Tunisia and Egypt.

=== Do Not Forget Us ===
Do Not Forget Us was made of neon, shirts, ink, and wood hangers. This is an installation where Helen took three of her father's dress shirts and had "La tansana" repeatedly stitched on the collars and cuffs. "La tansana" means "do not forget us." Mansour Omari was a political prisoner who was kept in an underground prison with 82 other inmates. The inmates used rust, blood, and chicken bones to write the names of every person on scraps of cloth. The list was then sewn into the shirt collar and cuffs of Omari's shirt. He was able to share the list of the disappeared upon his escape. Helen's piece was inspired by Omari's story and is a commemoration to all the individuals who have disappeared.

=== The Places They'll Go ===
The Places They'll Go is a series of 24 children's shoes painted with acrylic gouache. Helen named this series after Dr. Seuss. Shoes hold a double meaning for Helen. They are a symbol that represents the ability to run away from danger and also towards one's dreams. Zughaib inserts this symbol into her artwork to help signal the overall theme of journey and discovery. For Zughaib, she recounts her experience as a young girl in Beirut Lebanon, using her artwork to tell the story of her uprooted life. Once the Civil War had begun, she remembers living under curfew, not being able to attend school or go outside, sleeping on the floor, and eventually being evacuated. Remembering her father's words telling her to leave, she channels this theme into her artwork to highlight the theme of journey.

=== Chiclets (2014) ===
Chiclets is made on two panels with acrylic gouache on canvas. In this piece Helen Zughaib wanted to call attention to the fact that in Syria and Lebanon some families have so little money that the children had to sell individual pieces of gum in the streets rather than attending school. When Helen was young, children would come up to the cars to sell packets of chiclets. Helen and her siblings would get excited when their father would call over one of the children selling these chiclets to their car, but her father would give the child money and tell them to keep the chiclets. Her father would tell them that it was better for the children selling the chiclets to keep the money and the chiclets so that they could make a little more money later.

=== Eat the News Again ===
Similar to the first installation of this exhibit, Eat the News Again is an installation in which Helen used enamel paint and newspaper on ceramic plates to force viewers to consume what happened in the Syrian civil war. This installation included an image of a boy being carried by his father in a suitcase. Helen included dots throughout the piece referring to movement, journey, hope, and dreams.

== Books ==
=== Stories My Father Told Me ===
Stories My Father Told Me: Memories of a Childhood in Syria and Lebanon is a book written by Helen Zughaib with Elia Kamal Zughaib and illustrated by Helen Zughaib. This book contains 24 full color plates of original art by Helen accompanied by her father, Elia Zughaib's, stories from his childhood in Syria and Lebanon in the 1930s. Elia would write down his stories, and, though they were not very long, they were filled with vivid detail of rich culture, lifestyles, and traditions that were then translated into Helen's artwork. This gives audiences a look into life full of Lebanese and Syrian Christian culture and traditions.
