= Ahmad Canaan =

Arab-Israeli painter and sculptor (born 1965)

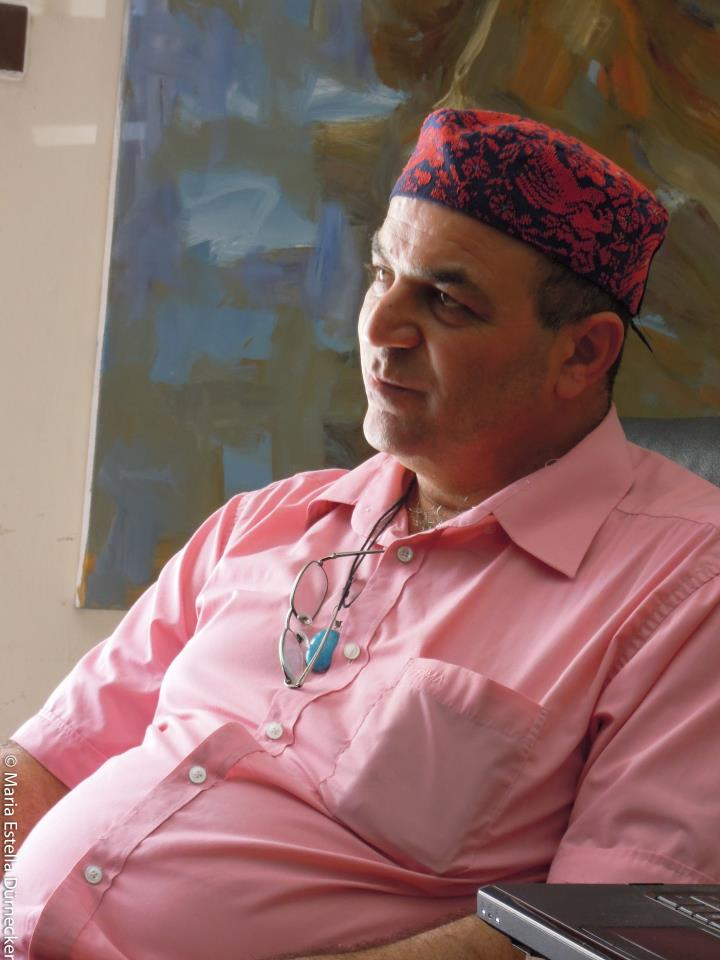
- Born: 1965 (age 60–61); Tamra, Israel
- Education: Bezalel - Academy of Arts and Design
- Known for: Painting, Sculpting, Mixed Media
- Style: Contemporary Palestinian
- Website: https://www.ahmadcanaan.com/

Ahmad Canaan (Arabic: أحمد كنعان, Hebrew: אחמד כנעאן; born in 1965 in Tamra, Israel) is a Palestinian painter and sculptor who is among the most prolific of his generation. He is known for his unique visual style drawing on motifs from Islamic art and Middle Eastern cultures and mythology. As an artist born to the post Nakbah generation, his work deals with the various facets of Palestinian identity and the culture. Through portraits, landscapes, and sculptures, he has both represented the Palestinian identity and invented new mythologies that speak to their situation and society.

Caneen received a BFA from Bezalel Academy of Arts and Design in Jerusalem, Israel. He is the curator of Jaffa Salon of Palestinian Art. His work has been exhibited locally and worldwide and can be found in museum and private collections worldwide. His sculptures can be found installed in public spaces and squares in towns all over Palestine.

His work has received many awards including the 1989 America-Israel Cultural Foundation Prize, and the Artist in the Community Grant of 2003 and 2010, from the Israeli Ministry of Culture.

In addition to his work as an artist, Canaan curates exhibitions all over Palestine and operates a gallery in his hometown, Tamra, where he founded the municipal gallery and the Canaan Art Gallery.

== Career ==
Canaan has participated in several solo and group exhibitions in Israel, the West Bank, the US, Japan, Russia, and Germany, including solo shows in Open Museum in Tefen, Museum on the Seam, Wilfrid Israel Museum and The Museum of Islamic Art in Jerusalem.
