= Nidaa Badwan =

Palestinian artist (born 1987)

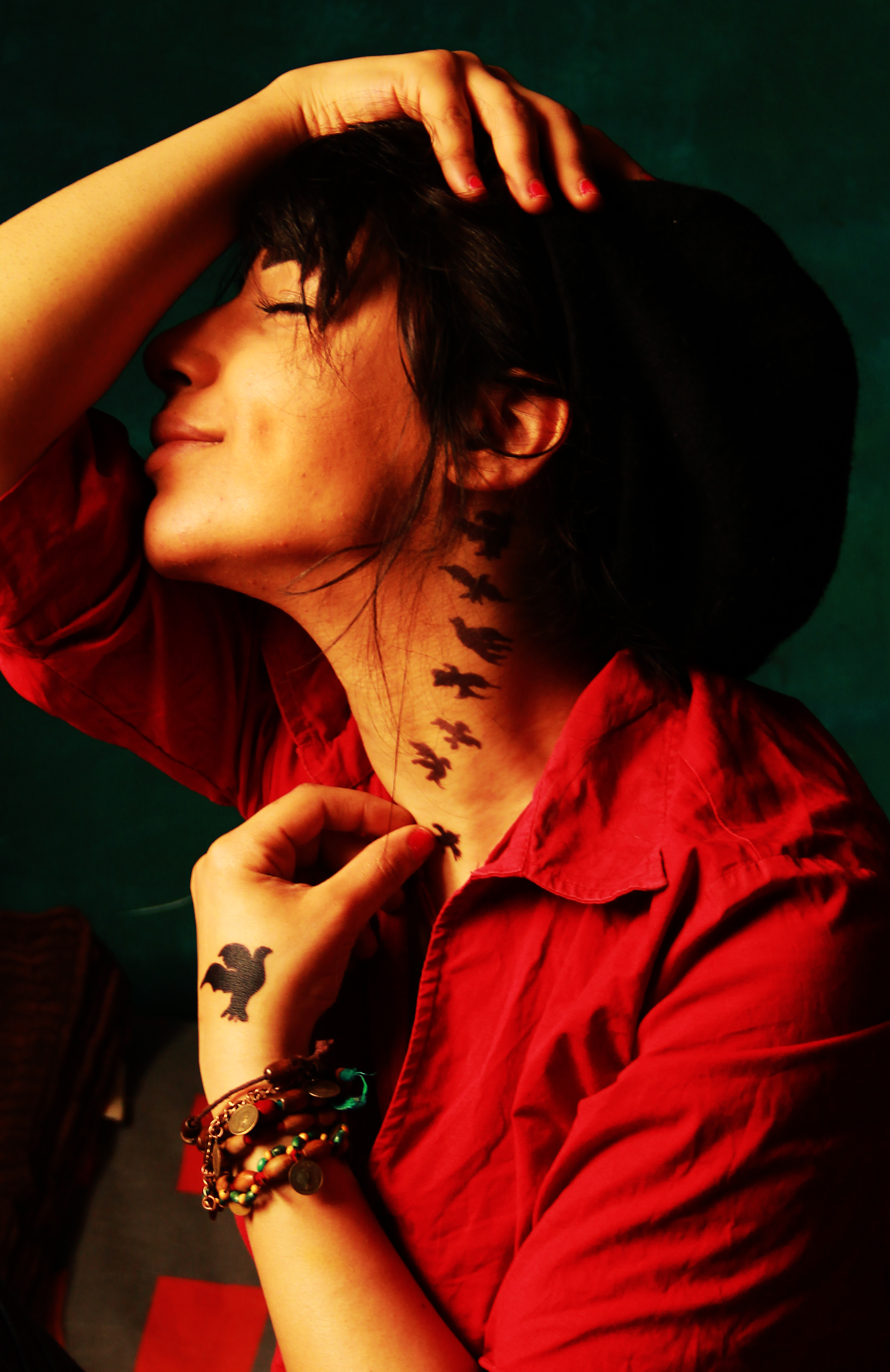
The artist Nidaa Badwan

Nidaa Badwan (born 17 April 1987) is a Palestinian artist who was born in the United Arab Emirates. She moved to Gaza when she was in sixth grade, and spent a year working in Amman after completing her fine arts degree at a Palestinian university.

== Career ==
Badwan is an artist known for her work 100 Days of Solitude, for which she spent an extended period of time creating a space in her room where she could isolate herself and escape from reality of Gaza. She says living in a city where she "lost basic rights as a human being" inspired her to "create an alternative world" in her room. This project is composed of 25 photographic self-portraits taken in that room since 13 November 2013 that portray her during her twenty months of self-imposed exile, started after she was abused by members of Hamas in Gaza.

She is a graduate of the Fine Arts School of Gaza's Al Aqsa University. Her story, reported in an interview with the New York Times, has made her known internationally, cited by many other newspapers, magazines and television from all over the world (such as ZDF, France24 and Sky Arte). After the years of Palestine, she moved to the Republic of San Marino, where she also worked as a university professor at the University of Design of the Republic of San Marino. Now, the artist lives in Italy.

Her exhibitions have toured and are touring the world: after the first in Jerusalem, numerous exhibitions in Italy, San Marino, Denmark, Germany, US, Spain, United Arab Emirates. In 2016, she was selected for The 2016 Sovereign Middle East & North Africa Art Prize Finalists, a prize for the 30 best artists in the Arab world. In 2017, she was a speaker at the UNESCO conference held in Carthage (Tunisia). Also in 2017, the municipality of Monte Grimano Terme, Italy, granted Nidaa with a space for herself right in the historical center of this little town, which is inserted in the club "Most Beautiful Villages in Italy". This place will be her "new room". The inauguration took place in the presence of numerous authorities, including the Consul of Palestine in Italy.
