= Abed Abdi =

Palestinian artist (born 1942)

Abed Abdi عبد عابدي
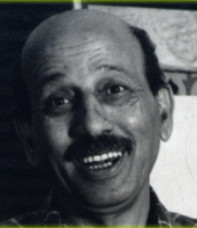
- Abed Abdi
- Born: 1942 (age 83–84); Haifa, Mandate Palestine
- Education: Dresden Academy of Fine Arts
- Known for: painting, sculpture and art lecturing
- Notable work: Fleeing from the massacre (1967)

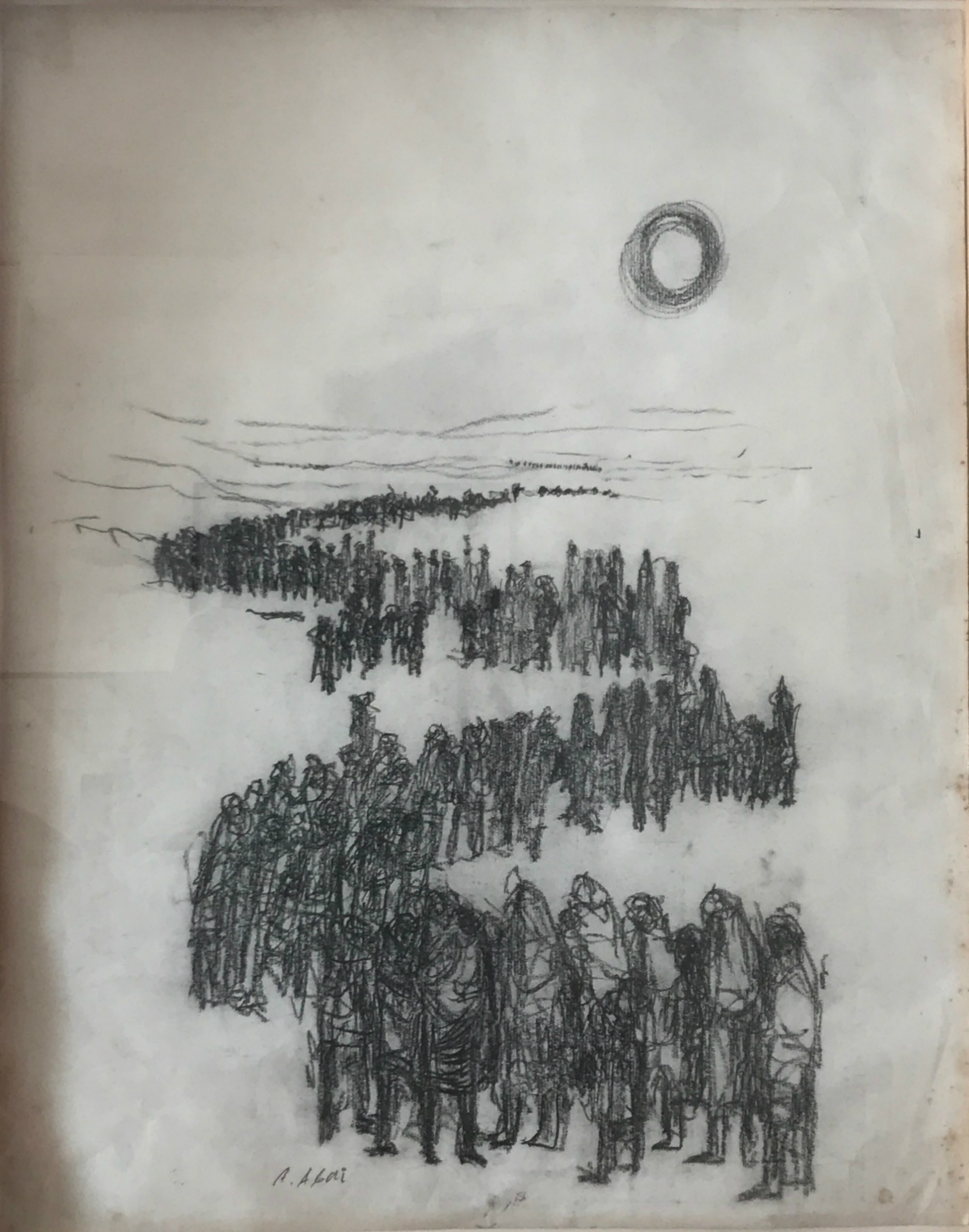
Fleeing... from the Massacre (1967) by Abed Abdi

Abed Abdi (Arabic: عبد عابدي, Hebrew: עבד עאבדי; born February 1942 in Haifa) is a Palestinian painter, graphic designer, sculptor and art lecturer.

Abdi worked as a blacksmith and illustrated Arabic publications that appeared in Israel. In 2023, Abed Abdi's work was featured in the group exhibition "On This Land" at Alserkal Arts Foundation in Dubai, showcasing Palestinian and Arab artists. After studying in Dresden, Abdi became the first Palestinian to build monumental art on native soil. His allegorical monuments in Galilee, honoring human fortitude and resistance, include a narrative mural depicting Elijah's defiance and survival and a bronze Land Day memorial.

Abdi held his first exhibition in Tel Aviv in 1962. He then pursued academic studies at the Fine Arts Academy in Dresden (Germany). His professors were Lea Grundig, Gerhard Bondzin and Gerhard Kettner. His masterwork at the academy received the 2nd prize, which allowed Abdi to spend another year at the academy and specialize in murals and environmental sculpture. In 1972 he returned to Haifa, and worked as graphic designer for a number of Arabic language publications, taught arts and designed murals. The city of Haifa awarded Abdi the "Hermann Struck Best Artist of the Year" Prize in 1973. That year, he also obtained the Young Artist's award at the Berlin International Youth Festival. The city of Haifa awarded him the "Best Artist of the Year Hermann Struck" award for the second time in 1999.

Abed Abdi has erected a number of memorial monuments and murals: in 1977—a sculpture to commemorate the Land Day of 1976; in 1984—the memorial to commemorate 75 years for the existence of the Galilean municipality of Shefa Amr. In addition, he has painted a number of murals in Haifa, Jaffa and Nazareth.

Abed Abdi has exhibited in Qatar, Israel, Belgium and Bulgaria. He has participated in over 45 group exhibitions, among them the joint Palestinian-Israeli exhibition "It's possible" which toured the US and Germany between 1988 and 1990. In 1995 he participated in the second exhibition for Palestinians and Israelis in Germany. His work appeared in the "Solidarity with the Palestinian People" exhibit in Tokyo, Berlin, Brussels, Belgrade and Athens. He also organized and participated in exhibitions with Israeli and Palestinian artists in Tel-Aviv, Haifa and West Jerusalem in the period between 1980 and 1987 defending the freedom of expression and creativity.

Abdi is an active member of the Haifa branch of the Israeli Association of Painters and Sculptures, as well as the Jewish-Arab Center of Beit Hagefen. This has enabled him to unite Palestinian and Israeli artists, and organize joint exhibitions, bringing the prospects of peace closer. Abdi founded the Ibda' society for the promotion of visual arts in the Arab Israeli sector and Ara belle - Visual Arts Workshop in Haifa, for the promotion of the visual arts and intercultural dialogue through the arts. Abdi is president of Al Midan Theater in Haifa. He has been teaching fine arts in the Arab Pedagogical College in Haifa since 1985.

== See also ==
- Visual arts in Israel
