= Ein Hemed =

National park and historic site in Israel

Coordinates: 31.79615°N 35.125973°E

- עין חמד or Aqua Bella
- Interactive map of Ein Hemed
- Periods: Crusader period, Middle Ages
- Cultures: Crusader
- Location: Jerusalem area, Israel

History
- Built by: Knights Hospitaller

Ein Hemed is a national park and nature reserve in Israel, in the hills seven kilometres west of modern Jerusalem and some 12 kilometres west of the Old City. It is also known by the Latin name it received from Crusaders, Aqua Bella, and as Khirbat Iqbalā in Arabic.

The park is located on the path of an old Roman road which remained in use through the Middle Ages. The road connected the coastal plain with Jerusalem, passing through Bab al-Wad. A fortified Hospitaller building from the Crusader period, relatively well-preserved, is arguably the main attraction, along with the streams and lush vegetation.

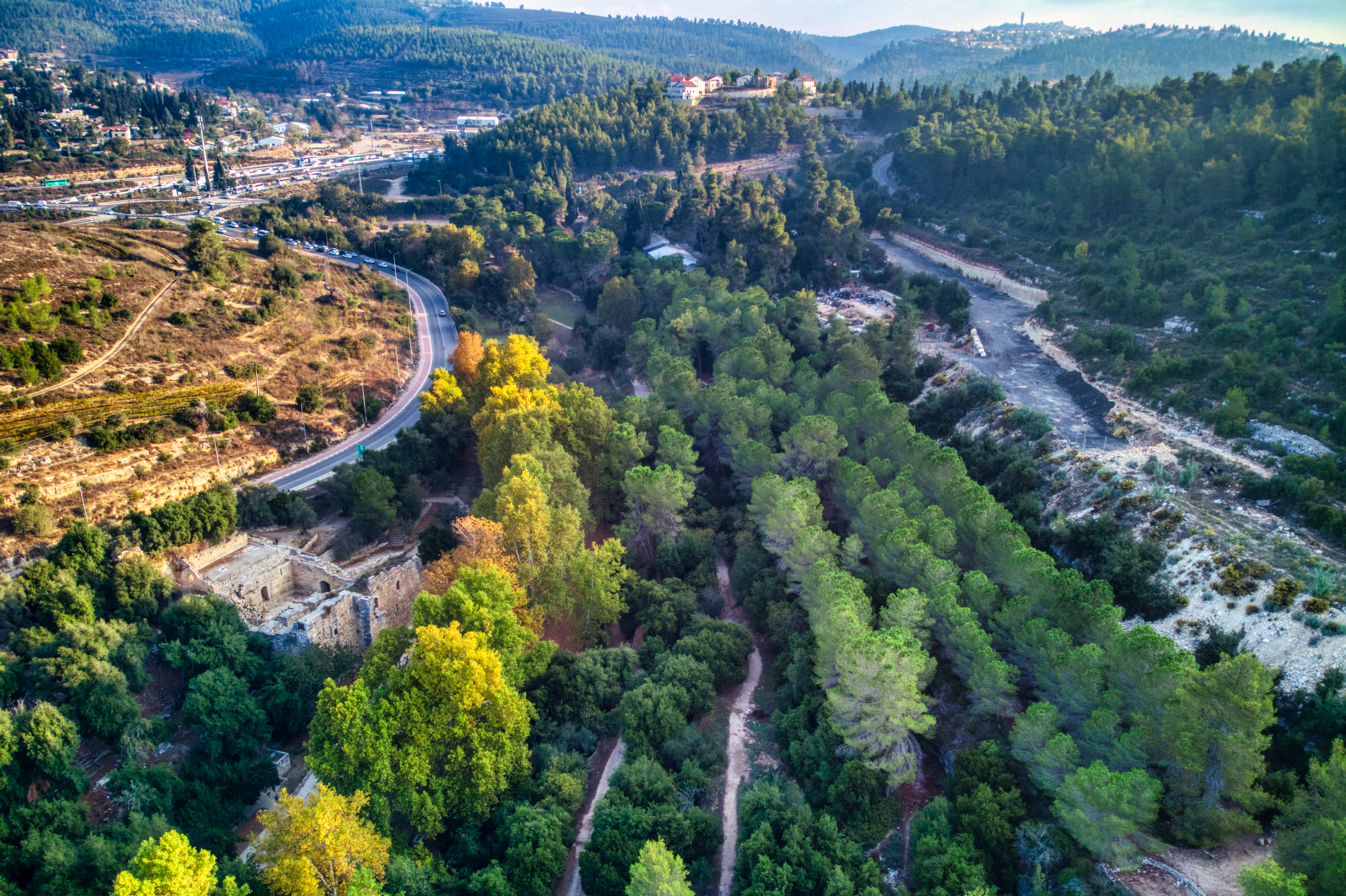
Aqua Bella nature reserve

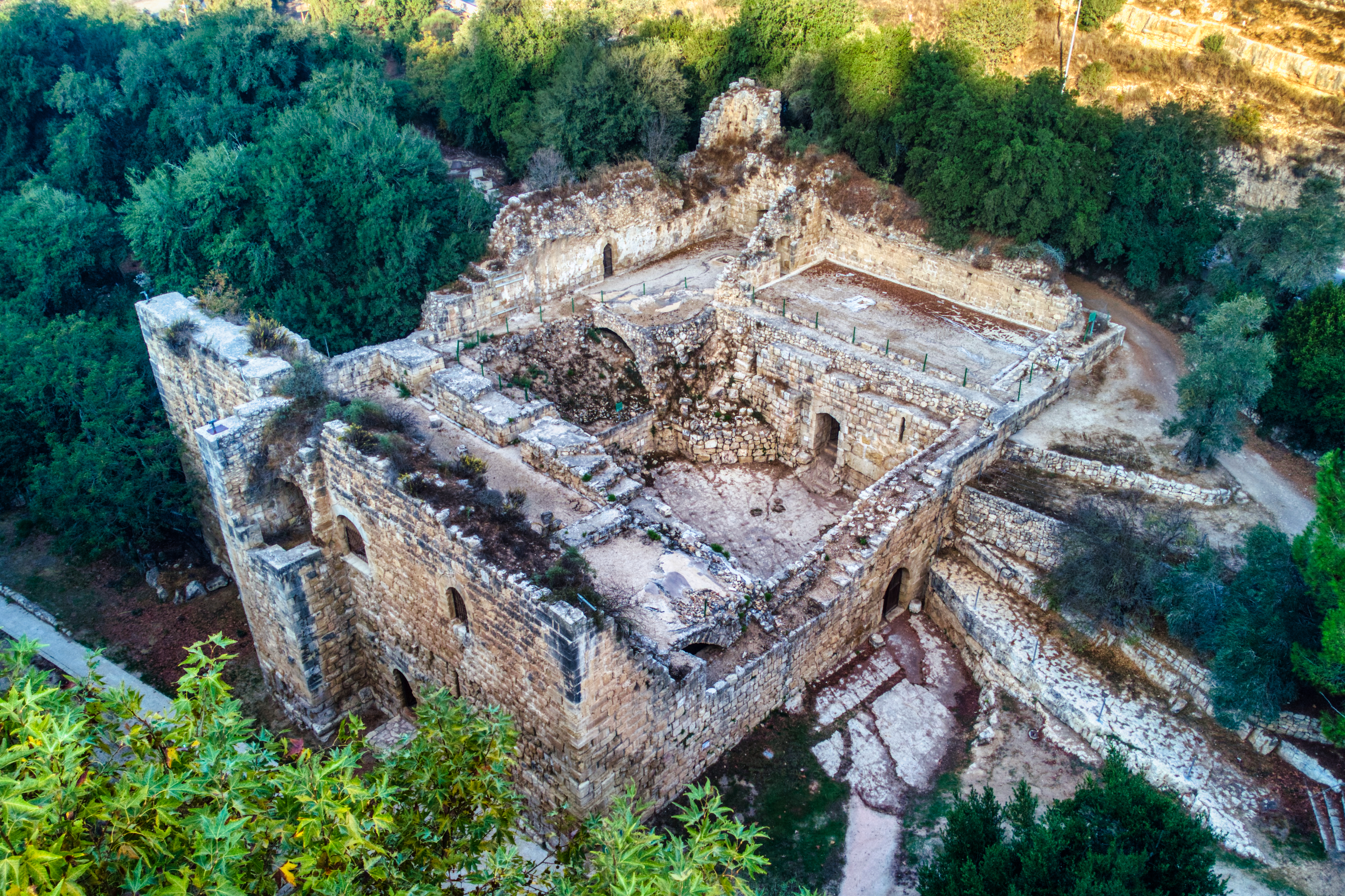
Aqua Bella, Crusader ruins

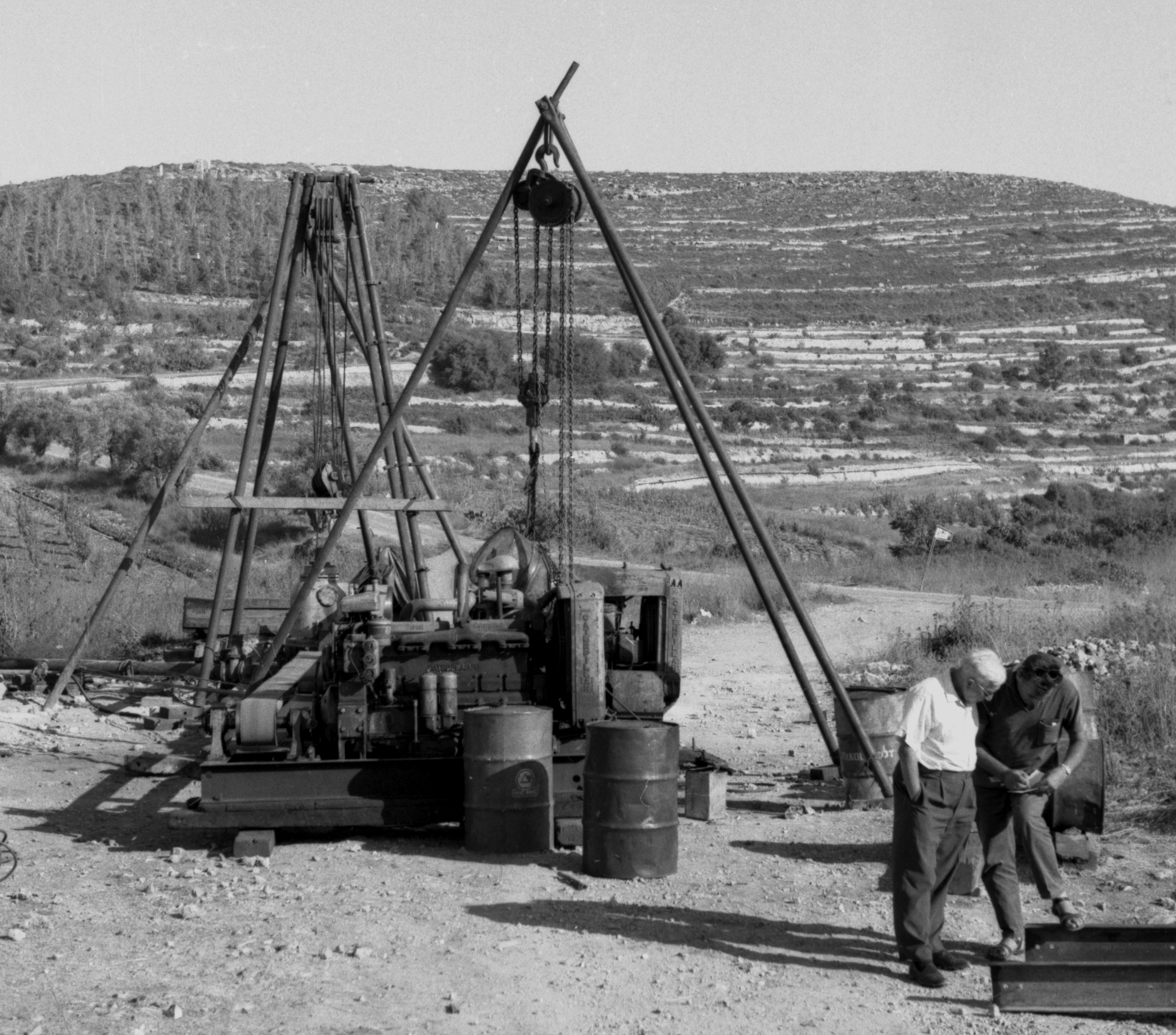
Water well drilling in Ein Hemedn, c. 1964

== Name ==
The Crusaders named it Aqua Bella in Latin, a name which was corrupted in Arabic to Iqbalā, thus becoming Khirbet Iqbalā, "Iqbalā Ruins". The 19th-century Arabic name was Deir el-Benat, also spelled Dayr al-Banat, meaning "convent of the maidens", and Khurbet Ikbala, interpreted at the time to mean "the ruin of prosperity", or perhaps "the southern ruin" or "the ruin opposite".

== History ==
=== Crusader courtyard building ===
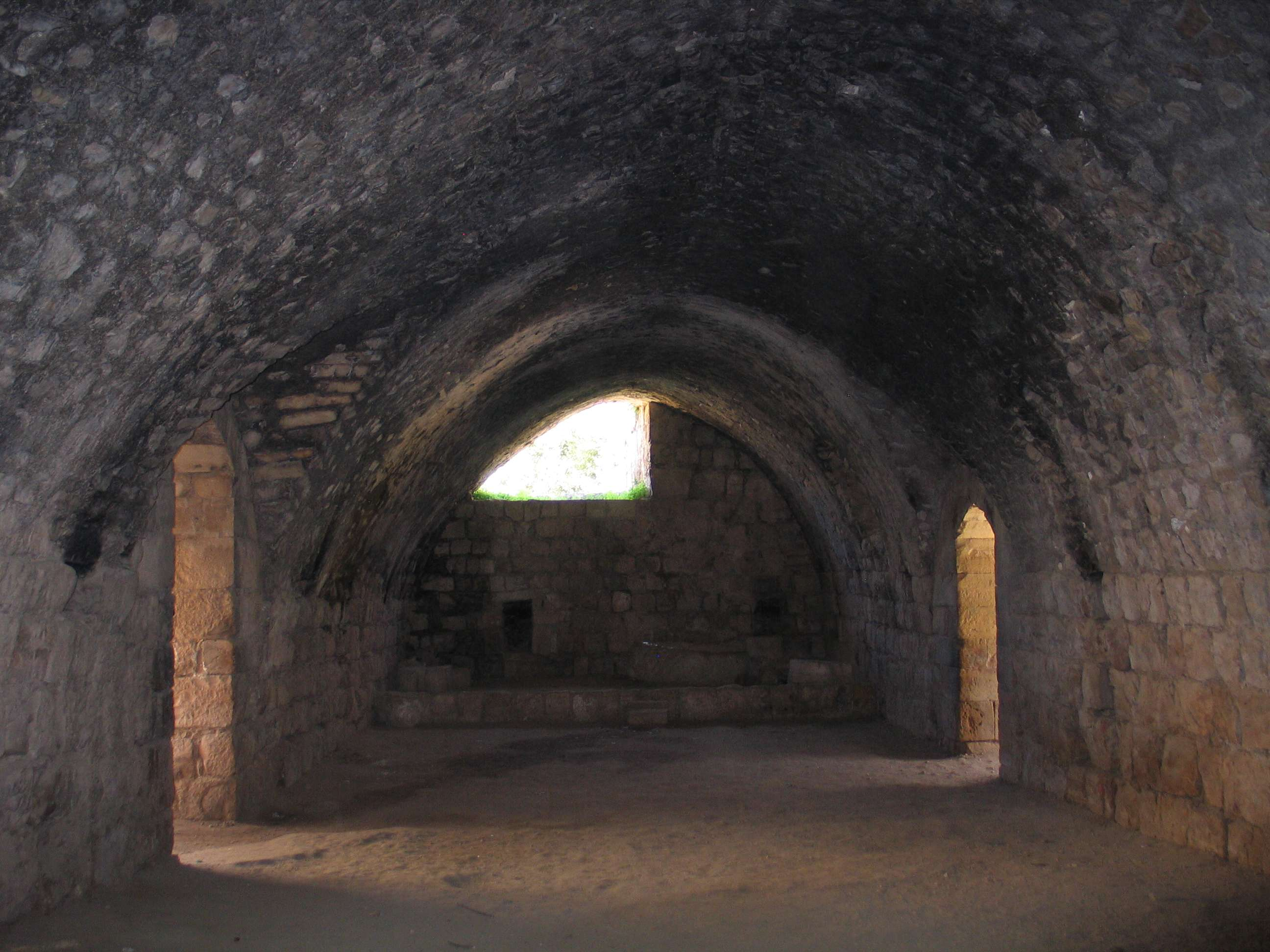
Vaulted hall

The Kingdom of Jerusalem built fortresses along the road to Jerusalem in order to control traffic and protect pilgrims visiting the Holy City. Farms were built using the spring water for irrigation.

Impressive ruins of a 30-by-40-metre (98 ft × 131 ft) Crusader courtyard building, whose southern wall survives to a height of 12 metres (39 ft), are located on the north site of the riverbed. The building has several gates and two arched halls. Archaeological investigations indicate that it was built circa 1140–1160, during the reign of Fulk of Jerusalem, in the same period as the fortresses on Tzova and Abu Ghosh. South of the building are a nature reserve and a Muslim cemetery.

=== Mandate period ===
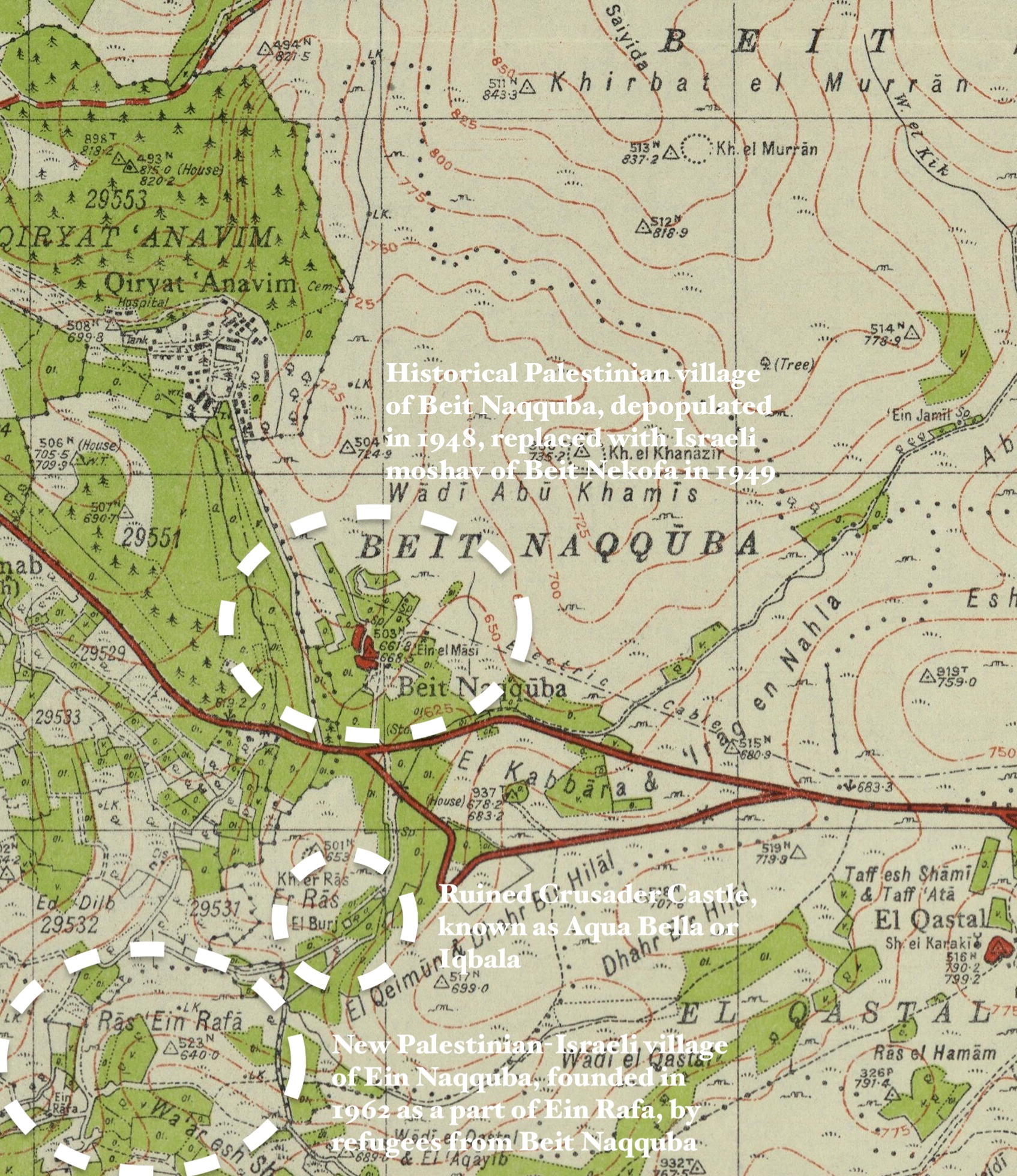
The area today known as Ein Hemed was historically on the village lands of Beit Naqquba as shown in this 1940s map; the village was depopulated in 1948 (its inhabitants returning to create Ein Naqquba in 1962) and was replaced by the moshav of Beit Nekofa.

The castle is shown as Khirbat Iqbalā on the 1880 PEF Survey of Palestine map, and as El Burj ("The Tower)" on the 1940s Survey of Palestine map.

The castle of Ein Hemed was historically on the village lands of Beit Naqquba. The village was depopulated in 1948 (its inhabitants returning to create Ein Naqquba in 1962) and was replaced by the moshav of Beit Nekofa.

=== Nachalat Yitzchak ===
In 1925, an American Jew named Isaac Segal Feller purchased a plot of 600 dunams on a hill above the springs. This land was called "Nachalat Yitzchak" or "Kiryat YaSaF" after its founder. During the 1936–1939 Arab revolt and 1948 Arab–Israeli War, it served as a base for Hagana training and military operations. Since 1994, there have been disputes over development of the site for residential or tourism purposes.

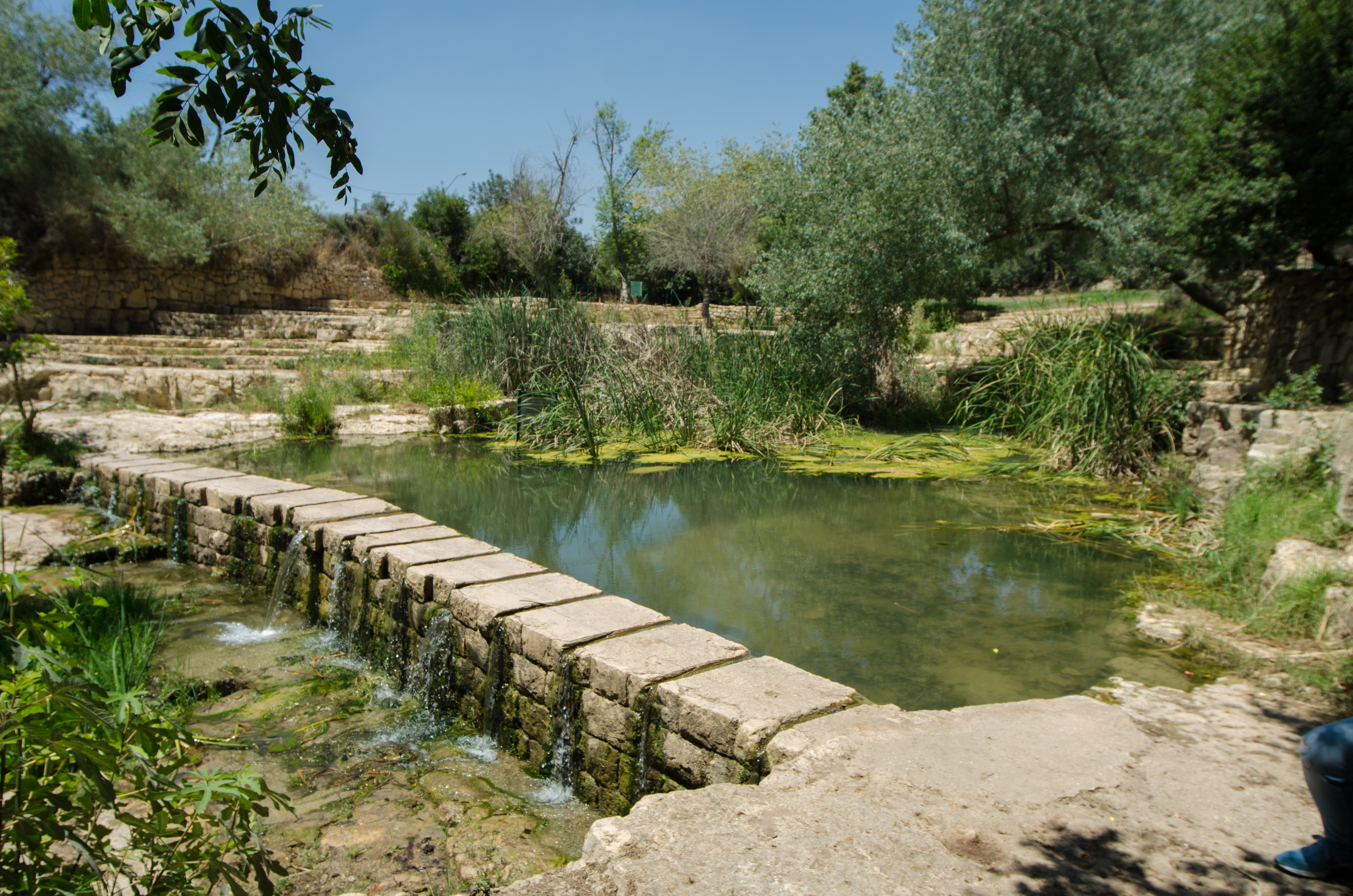

== National park and nature reserve ==
The nature reserve and park were established in 1968. The cemetery includes the grave of Sheikh Abdullah, in whose honour the oak and terebinth trees in the nature reserve were never cut down. A picnic site has been created nearby. Four layer springs issue from the riverbed and nearby caves, and unite into a flow of water which continues for about 400 metres. Several dams have been built, creating pools, the largest of which is 20 by 20 metres (66 ft × 66 ft) and 1 metre (3.3 ft) deep.

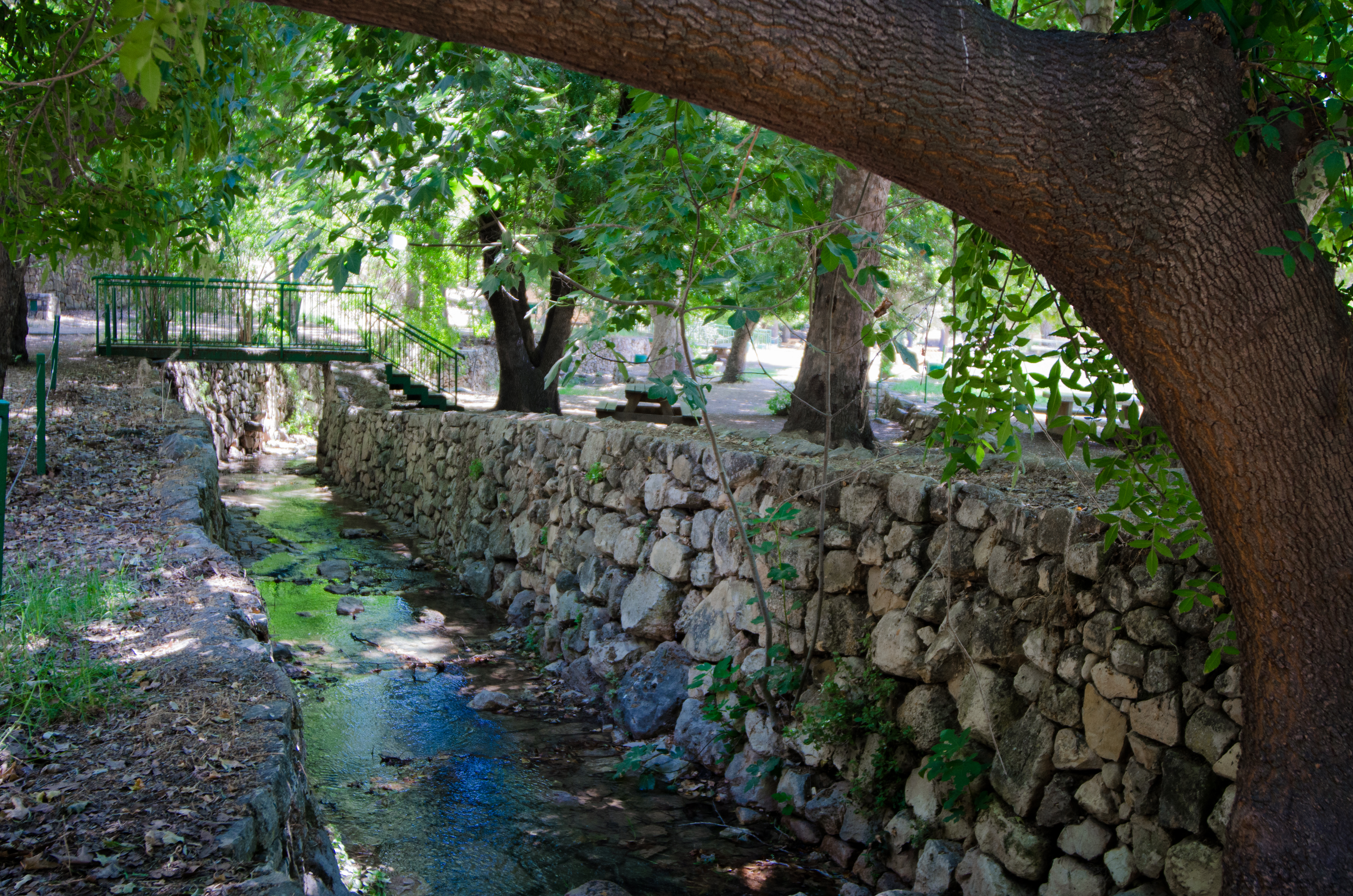

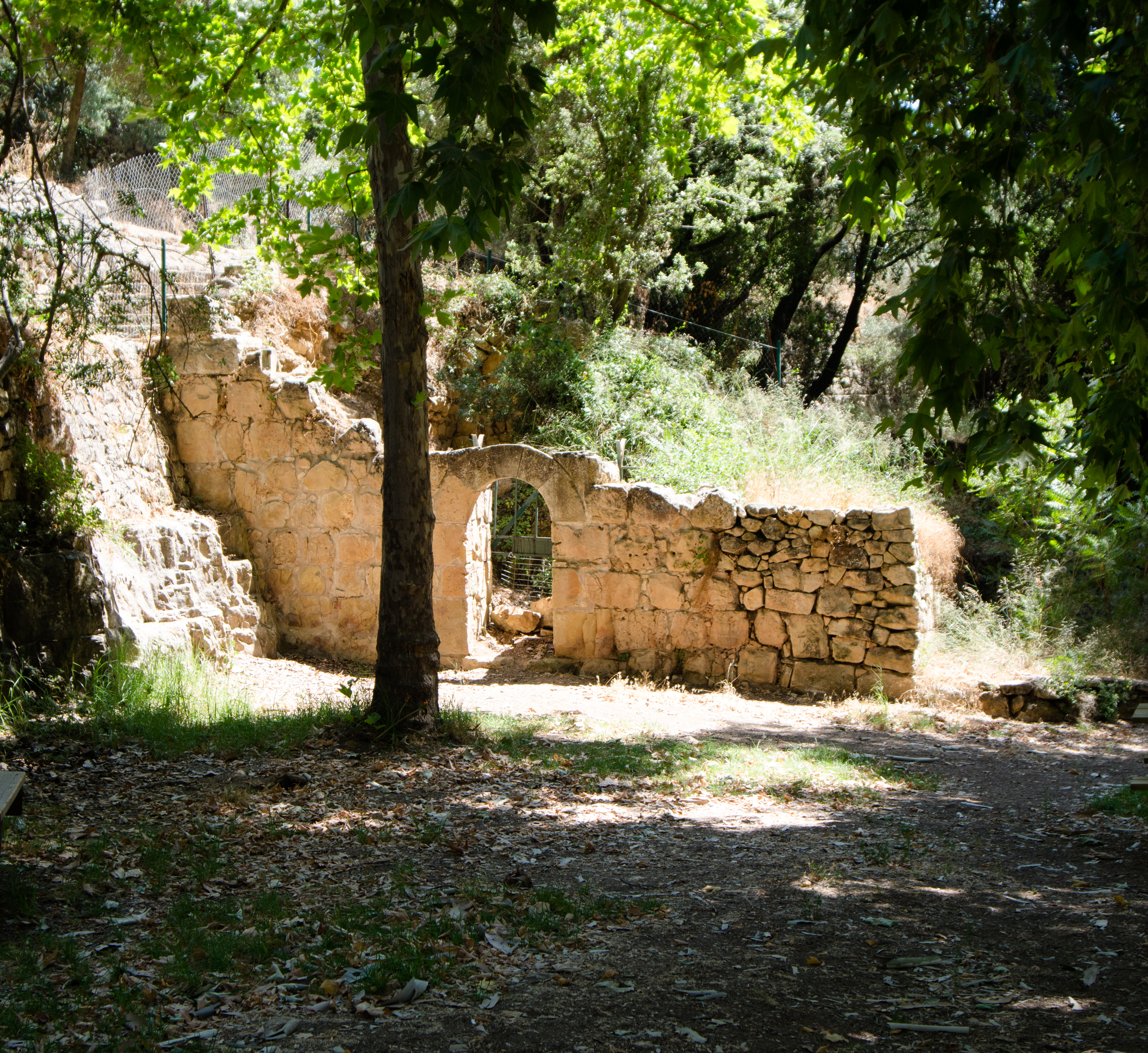

== See also ==
- Tourism in Israel
- National Parks of Israel

== Bibliography ==
- Avner, Rina (2009-07-15). "'En Hemed" (121). Hadashot Arkheologiyot – Excavations and Surveys in Israel.
- Clermont-Ganneau, C.S. (1899). [ARP] Archaeological Researches in Palestine 1873-1874, translated from the French by J. McFarlane. Vol. 1. London: Palestine Exploration Fund. (p. 22)
- Clermont-Ganneau, C.S. (1896). [ARP] Archaeological Researches in Palestine 1873-1874, translated from the French by J. McFarlane. Vol. 2. London: Palestine Exploration Fund.
- Conder, C.R.; Kitchener, H.H. (1883). The Survey of Western Palestine: Memoirs of the Topography, Orography, Hydrography, and Archaeology. Vol. 3. London: Committee of the Palestine Exploration Fund. (pp. 114−115; 165)
- Guérin, V. (1868). Description Géographique Historique et Archéologique de la Palestine (in French). Vol. 1: Judee, pt. 1. Paris: L'Imprimerie Nationale. (pp. 278−279)
- Palmer, E.H. (1881). The Survey of Western Palestine: Arabic and English Name Lists Collected During the Survey by Lieutenants Conder and Kitchener, R. E. Transliterated and Explained by E.H. Palmer. Committee of the Palestine Exploration Fund.
- Pringle, D. (1993). The Churches of the Crusader Kingdom of Jerusalem: A-K (excluding Acre and Jerusalem). Vol. I. Cambridge University Press. ISBN 0-521-39036-2. (pp. 239−250)
- Pringle, D. (2009). The Churches of the Crusader Kingdom of Jerusalem: The cities of Acre and Tyre with Addenda and Corrigenda to Volumes I-III. Vol. IV. Cambridge University Press. ISBN 978-0-521-85148-0. (p. 267)
- Röhricht, R. (1893). (RRH) Regesta regni Hierosolymitani (MXCVII-MCCXCI) (in Latin). Berlin: Libraria Academica Wageriana. (p. 51, No 205)
- Storchan, Benyamin (2015-12-15). "'En Hemed, Hemed Interchange" (127). Hadashot Arkheologiyot – Excavations and Surveys in Israel.
- Tyrwhitt-Drake, C.F. (1874). "Mr. Tyrwhitt-Drakes Reports". Quarterly Statement - Palestine Exploration Fund. 23: 64–79. (p. 77)
- Zilberbod, Irina (2016-06-26). "'En Hemed" (128). Hadashot Arkheologiyot – Excavations and Surveys in Israel.
