= Palestinian landscape painting =

Palestinian landscape painting refers to landscape painting made in and about the land of Palestine. Historically, Palestinian landscape art originally focused on a majority-Islamic depiction of the holy land. However, after the Nakba and subsequent displacement of Palestinians, Palestinian landscape art (similarly to all Palestinian art) began to have more of a nationalist subtext to explore Palestinians’ connection to their identity and homeland.

== History ==
Ismael Shammout’s Where To? (1953) depicts a Palestinian family leaving their homeland

=== 1948 – 1990s ===
Though there were numerous Palestinian landscape artists from the early 20th century, there is little documentation of them as a result of the displacement of Palestinians in 1948 (Nakba). Artists during this period immediately after the Nakba, such as Ismail Shammout, mainly evoked feelings of sorrow and loss in their paintings as a result of this displacement. This can be seen in their paintings via imagery such as a withered tree, a symbol of loss and literal uprootedness, and the absence of a maternal figure connoting the loss of the beloved former homeland.

However, the latter half of the 20th century gave new life to the art of landscape in Palestine— Living under Israeli occupation not only gave rise to an era of civil disobedience and armed resistance, but also to a new breed of Palestinian visual artists whose creative sensibilities had been forged in the hard realities of their lives in their ghetto. Palestinian landscape art from the 1970s onwards fused resistance slogans with popular posters, folkloric symbols, and nostalgic images from a romanticized past, in a format that escaped the excesses of Israeli censorship. Pioneers of this era included Sliman Mansour, whose landscapes primarily displayed the men, women and children who were exiled from their homeland literally carrying Palestine on their backs. Masour’s work both symbolizes how the weight (or burden) of Palestine will always be carried by its people and how the land is fetishized and idealized by the Palestinians as a response to the alienation of daily experience and loss of their homeland.

=== First and Second Intifadas (1990s – 2000s) ===
During the Intifada period, Palestinian landscape art most significantly represented Palestinian identity and culture, intentionally excluding the extreme violence seen at the time. There was also a strong emphasis on heritage, history, and connection to the land itself. Artists used the portrayal of the natural landscape and elements to express these themes.

An individual artist influential during this time was Asim Abu Shaqra, a Palestinian artist trained in Israel. His work in the late 1980s and early 1990s, especially in a 1994 retrospective exhibition, focused on the Palestinian landscape as a way to represent identity and heritage. This interpretation of landscape art was further shown in The Qattan Foundation’s Biennial Exhibitions in 2000 and 2002. The exhibitions provided a competitive setting for the growth of Palestinian art during the Intifada period, where landscape artists notably created tranquil scenes with little political, violent, or nationalistic themes. This contrast marks a major theme of landscape art during the intifadas, where Palestinian land and culture was shown with a strong divergence from the brutality actually seen on the land.

=== Contemporary landscape (2010s – present) ===
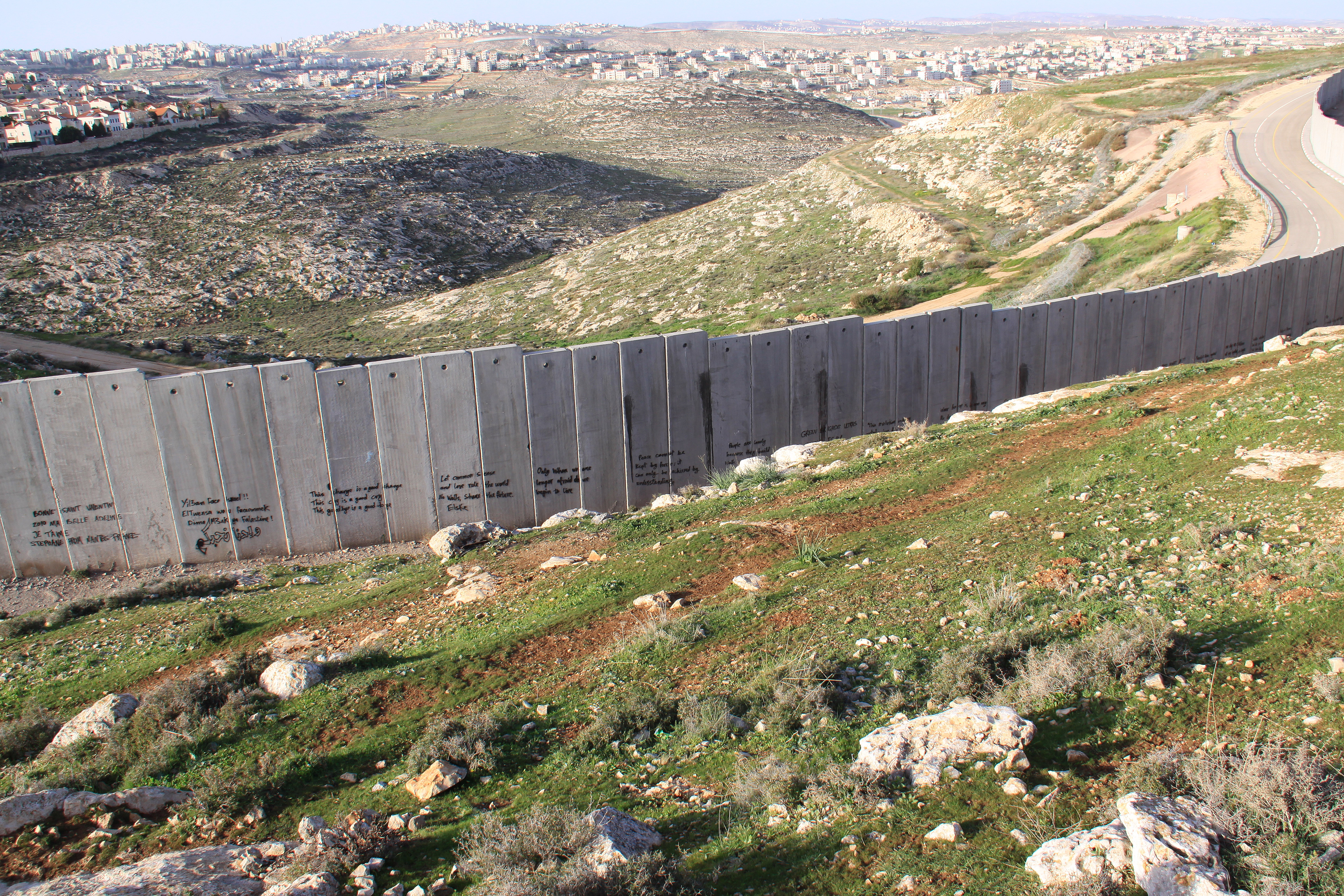
Israeli Wall in the West Bank

In the early 2010s, Palestinian landscape art focused on the landscape artists could see. This included monuments known to Palestinians across the diaspora, and the wall built by Israel. Additionally, artists like Vian Shamounki participate in many exhibitions showcasing their art, hopes, and dreams. In 2013, Shamounki opened an exhibition of landscape and figure paintings from Jerusalem called Hopes and Dreams. Her opening statement quotes, "in life one has to be hopeful that the right thing will happen. And, one has to have dreams of peace for all to exist in this holy place in harmony and human brotherhood…I consider my paintings as visual poems, poems of hope, poems of love and poems that capture expression and human emotions".

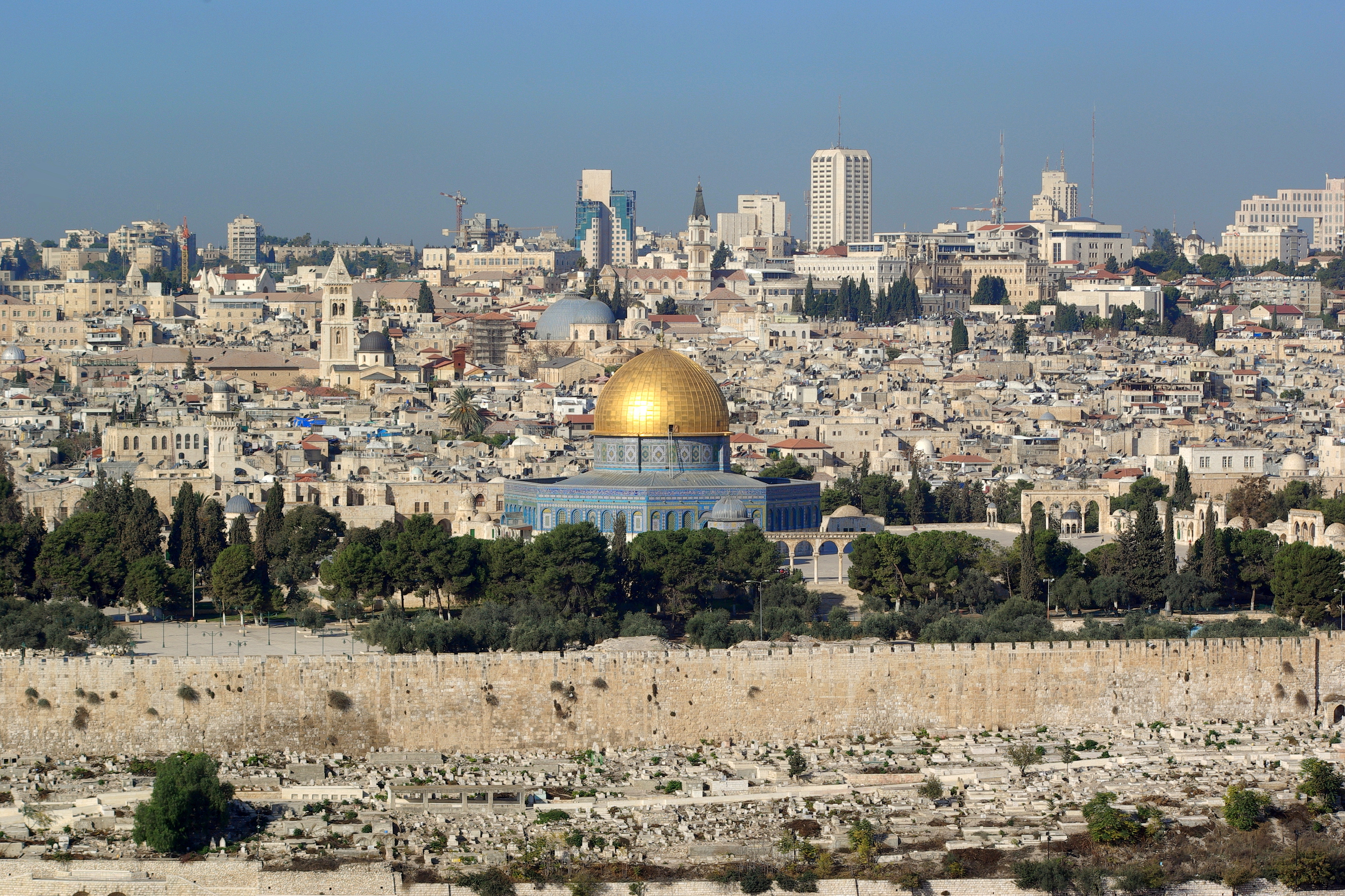
The Dome of the Rock is a prominent landmark of the Palestinian landscape.

Photographers and filmmakers also use the wall as a statement in the landscape of their scenes. Filmmaker Yazan Khalili creates a film in the form of a book titled On Love and Other Landscapes. Khalili states this work shows “... narrative of a failed love story, involving a woman who had recently abandoned the narrator and left him with the landscape photographs lacking his presence and the presence of the notorious Israeli built Wall in the West Bank, an absence which echoes the atmosphere conjured by these images". In 2014, photographer Mohamed Badarne created the series crack 708. This series shows moments on or surrounding the wall. On this series, Badarne states "I try to let the viewer bear the weight of the dilemmas and questions that I inhabit, and leave him to choose the image of Palestine that he desires". In an opposite view, filmmaker Larissa Sansour creates two short films that distort the view of the Palestinian landscape. In the 2012 short film Nation Estate, Sansour portrays the landscape of Palestine as a skyscraper where each floor represents something significant to Palestine. The windows of the skyscraper overlook the actual Palestinian landscape and include landmarks such as the Dome of the Rock.

== Significance ==
Palestinian landscape art, like all landscape art, can be descriptive of their subject matter either in a general (vague) manner or can be precise & specific; that is, they can refer to views of land without a reference to a specific location or they can be empirical observations of specific locations.

According to anthropologist Nayrouz Abu Hatoum, the significance of Palestinian landscape art lies in resisting the visual politics dictated by the Israeli regime. According to American academic W.J.T Mitchell, "We are called upon, in short, to think of Palestine as a work of landscape art in progress, to ask what vision of this land can be imagined, what geographical poetry can be recited over it, to heal, repair, unite, understand, and commemorate this place". Several landscape artists, such as Mohammed Al-Hawajri, liken the native landscape in their art as an extension of their own body. Others, such as the aforementioned Halaby, paint landscapes as resistance against Israeli settlers, focusing on the natural life of Palestine whilst intentionally ignoring the Israeli-built structures which dominate the occupied landscape today. Additionally, the landscape art created by Ibrahim Ghannam possesses the loving sentiment and detailed knowledge of Palestinian village life, enabling all Palestinians to revel and relax mentally in their native homeland without being physically present. Landscape artists who paint in a more “vague” sense, such as Rafat Asad, tend to paint landscape art intentionally vaguely as a result of the separation from the land caused by occupation.

== Symbolism ==
Imagery of natural subjects indigenous to the land are often repeated in representations of the Palestinian landscape. Their inclusion is due to the assignment of symbolic meaning by Palestinians.

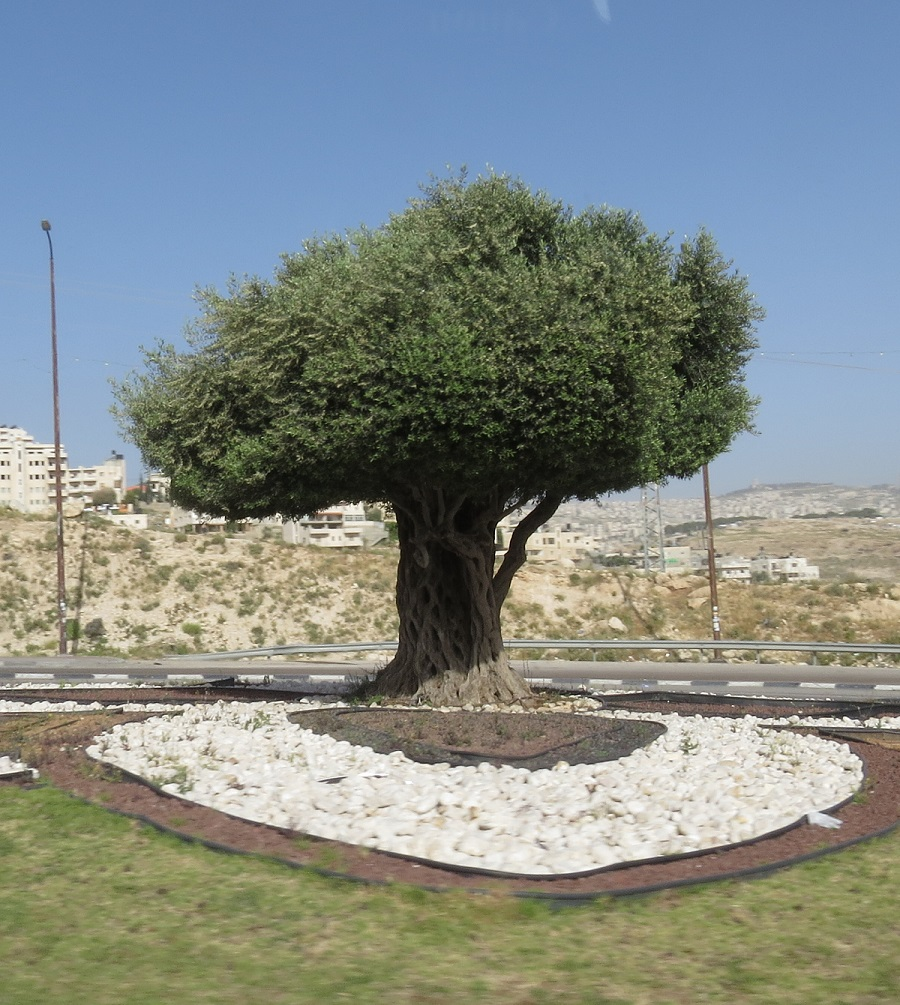
An olive tree in Jerusalem

- The olive tree represents tradition, nationalism and a love and connection to the land of Palestine, found most significantly in the early 1980s. Olive trees are indigenous to the mountain regions of the West Bank, dating back 8,000 years, and Palestinian familial traditions revolving around olive trees remain a prominent part of the culture.

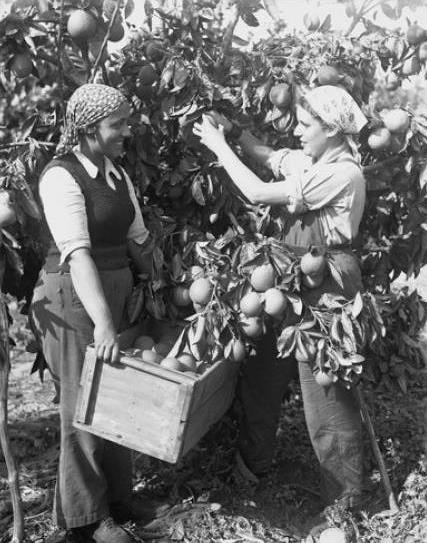
Jaffa orange picking in 1937

- Orange trees and Jaffa oranges symbolize loss after the Nakba. Before, large plots of land towards the coast were dedicated to orange groves, most significantly in Jaffa and Haifa. Oranges were representative of Palestinian national pride. The orange now represents Palestinian sorrow in the loss of land and what was once a symbol of national pride.
- Cacti are used to represent community and resilience of Palestinians. Indigenous to much of the Palestinian landscape, the cactus was used to border gardens or was eaten as fruit pre-Nakba. This inspired the meaning of community, both in the act of eating the fruit and joining together the land of different families. This idea died out during the Nakba, but the cactus was revived as a symbol of resilience and regrowth due to its use to mark or commemorate villages destroyed over the course of several Israeli invasions. It has since grown to symbolize hope for the future of Palestine and the Palestinian right to return to their homeland

== List of landscape artists ==
- Mohammed Al-Hawajri
- Nabil Anani
- Khalil Halaby
- Sophie Halaby
- George Aleeff
- Rafat Asad
- Nicola Saig
- Ibrahim Ghamman
- Vian Shamounki
- Yazan Khalili
- Mohamed Badarne
- Larissa Sansour
- Asim Abu Shakra
