= Kamal Abdulfattah =

Palestinian geographer

- Born: Kamal Jaber Hasan Abdulfattah; February 9, 1943; Umm al-Fahm, Mandatory Palestine
- Died: January 27, 2023 (aged 79); Jenin
- Education: Damascus University, University of Erlangen–Nuremberg
- Occupations: Researcher; geographer; professor
- Years active: 1978–2023

Kamal Abdulfattah (born February 9, 1943, in Umm al-Fahm – died January 27, 2023, in Jenin) was a Palestinian geographer and researcher.

== Biography ==
Abdulfattah studied at the Damascus University. After completing his studies, he obtained a Ph.D. in geography from University of Erlangen–Nuremberg in 1980.

Beginning in 1978, Abdulfattah taught as an teaching assistant at department of Middle Eastern studies at Birzeit University. In 1980, become dean at faculty of Arts at Birzeit University. In the following years, he established the Geography department at the university.

== Notable works ==
- Hütteroth, W.-D.; Abdulfattah, Kamal (1977). Historical Geography of Palestine, Transjordan and Southern Syria in the Late 16th Century. Erlanger Geographische Arbeiten, Sonderband 5. Erlangen, Germany: Vorstand der Fränkischen Geographischen Gesellschaft. ISBN 3-920405-41-2.
- Mountain farmer and fellah in Asir Southwest Saudi Arabia: The conditions of agriculture in a traditional society. Erlangen, Germany. 1981.

== Awards ==
- Abdul Hameed Shoman Award for Arab scientists in social sciences, 1983.
- Palestine Award for social sciences, 1997.
