= Ein Naqquba =

Arab village in central Israel

Ein Naqquba: עֵין נַקוּבָּא (Hebrew); عين نقوبا (Arabic)
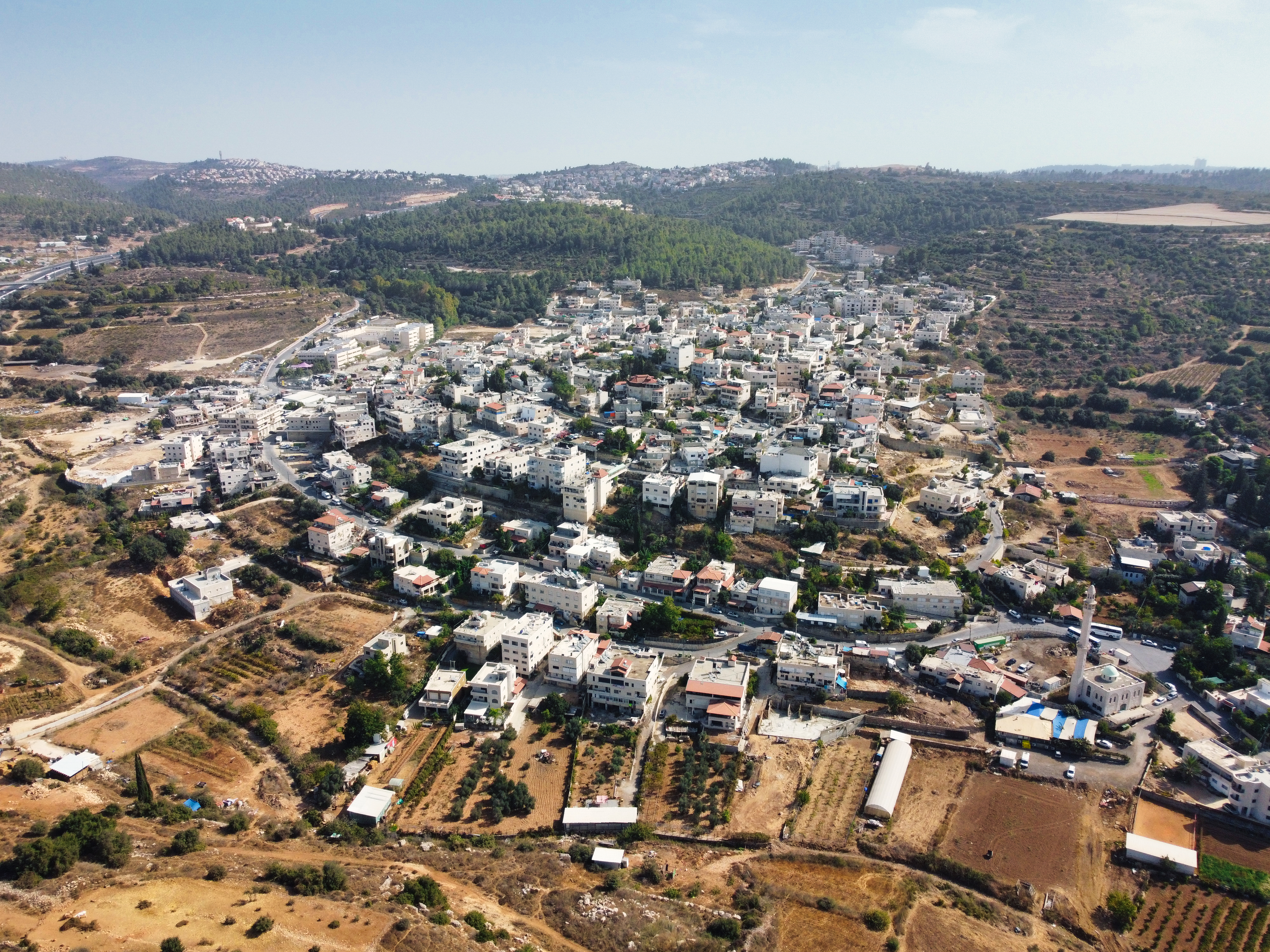

- Location within Jerusalem District Location within Israel
- Coordinates: 31°47′36″N 35°7′6″E
- Country: Israel
- District: Jerusalem
- Council: Mateh Yehuda
- Founded: 1962
- Founder: Former residents of Bayt Naqquba
- Population (2024): 3,849

Ein Naqquba (Arabic: عين نقوبا, Hebrew: עֵין נַקוּבָּא) is an Arab village in central Israel. Located west of Jerusalem, it falls under the jurisdiction of Mateh Yehuda Regional Council. In 2024 it had a population of 3,849.

== History ==
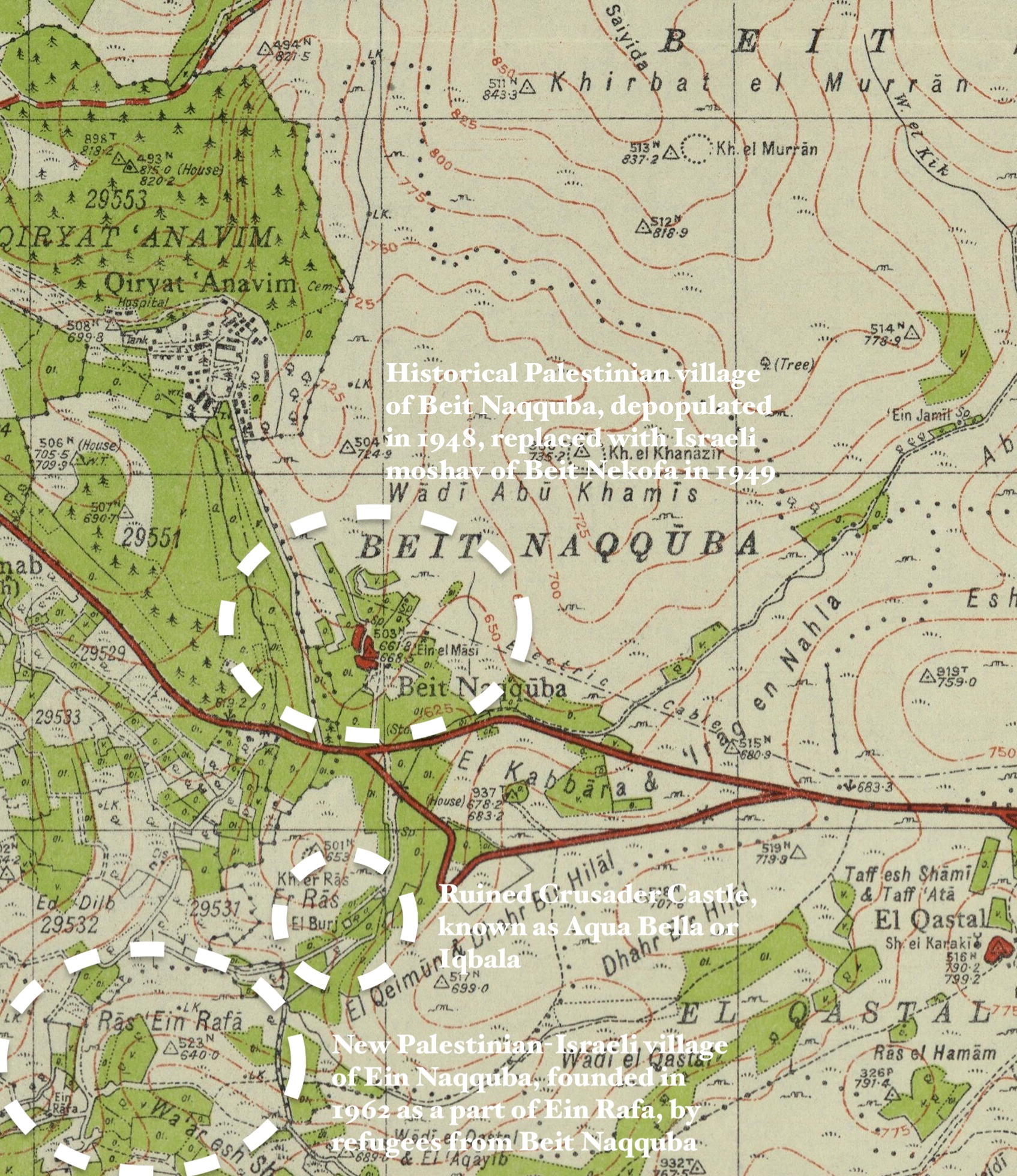
The historical village lands of Beit Naqquba as shown in this 1940s Survey of Palestine map; the village was depopulated in 1948 (its inhabitants returning to create Ein Naqquba in 1962) and was replaced by the moshav of Beit Nekofa.

The village was established in 1962 by refugees from the village of Bayt Naqquba, which had been depopulated during the 1948 Arab–Israeli War and whose lands had become Beit Nekofa. It was part of Ein Rafa until 1976, when it was recognised as a separate village.

== Gallery ==
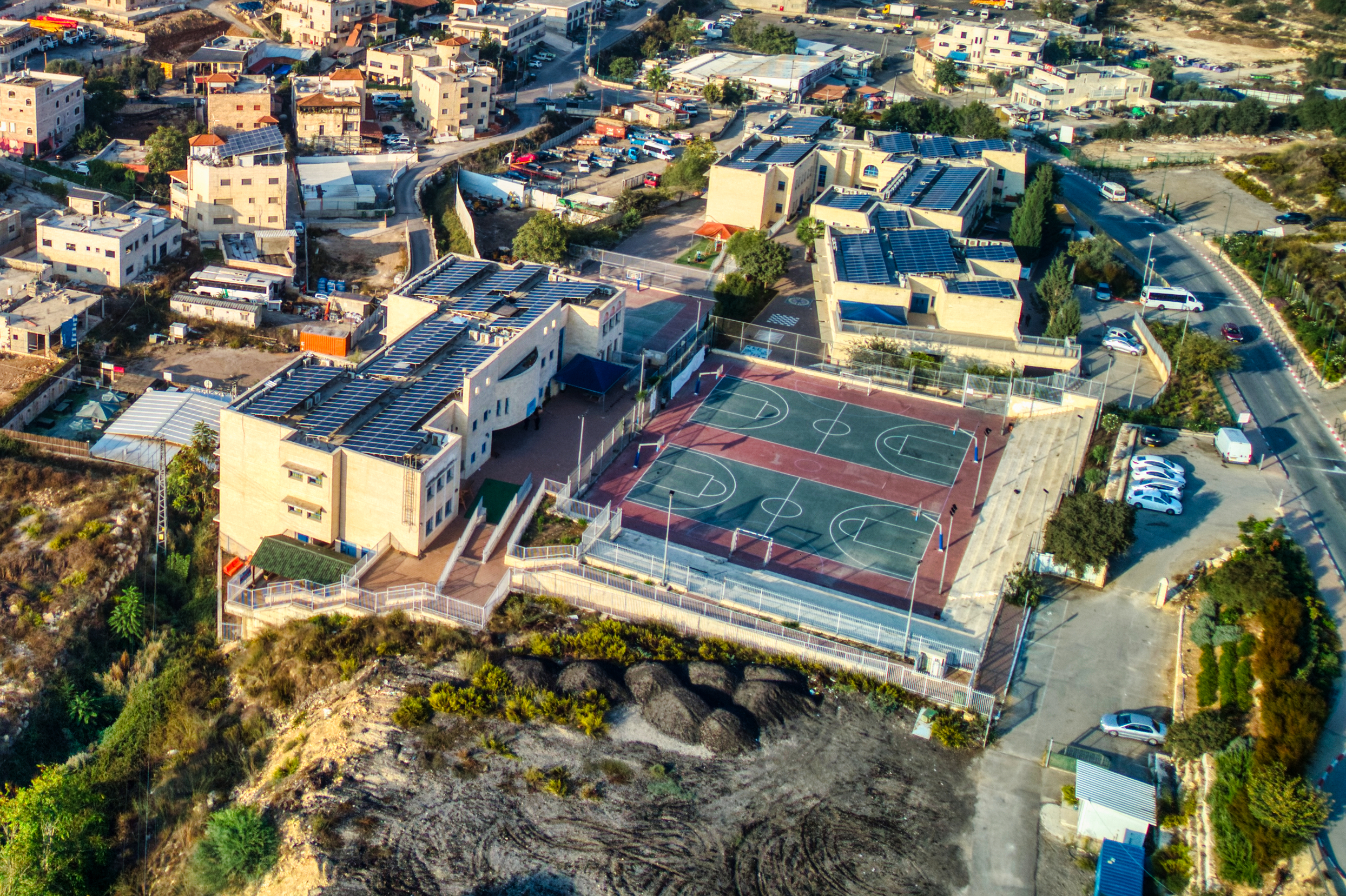
Branco Weiss School Ein Nakuba - Ein Rafa

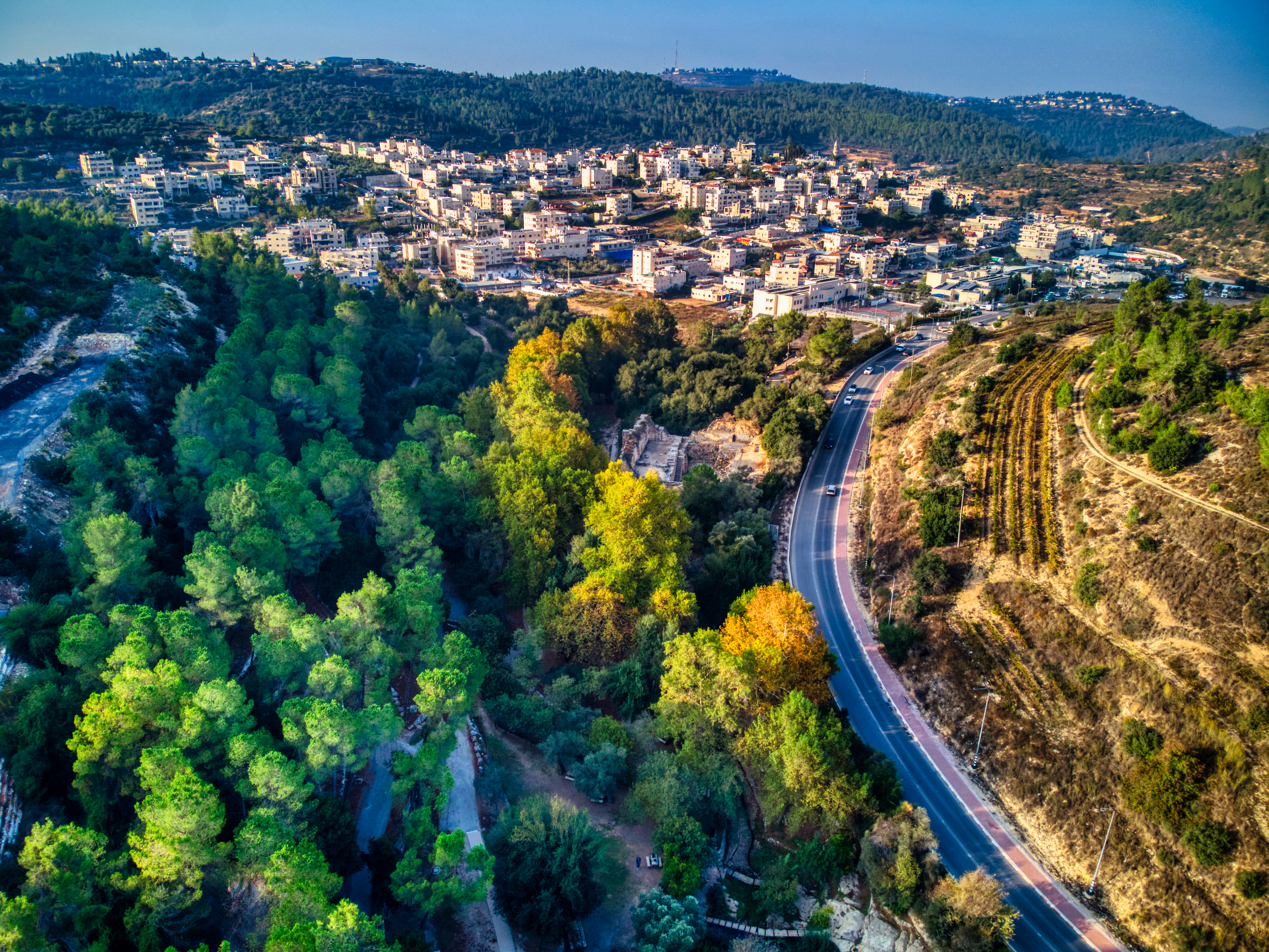
Khirbat Iqbalā, Aqua Bella, a historic and nature site near the village. The cemetery of the village is located inside the site
