= Mohammed Jamal Jebreen =

Palestinian footballer

Mohammed Jamal Jebreen محمد جمال جبارين
Personal information
- Date of birth: May 22, 1982 (age 44)
- Place of birth: Umm al-Fahm, Israel
- Height: 5 ft 8 in (1.73 m)
- Position: Winger

Team information
- Current team: Hapoel Iksal

Youth career
- Hapoel Umm al-Fahm

Senior career*
Years	Team	Apps	(Gls)
2002–2003	Hapoel Umm al-Fahm		
2003–2004	F.C. Umm al-Fahm		
2004–2005	Hapoel Asi Gilboa		
2005	Hapoel Herzliya		
2005	Hapoel Reineh		
2005–2006	Hapoel Makr		
2006–2007	Hapoel Petah Tikva		
2007	→ Hapoel Umm al-Fahm		
2007–2010	F.C. Umm al-Fahm		
2008–2009	→ Hapoel Umm al-Fahm		
2010–2011	Hilal Al-Quds		
2011–2014	Shabab Al-Khaleel		
2014–2015	Ihud Bnei Kafr Qara	15	(3)
2015–2016	Markaz Balata		
2016	Thaqafi Tulkarem		
2016–2017	Ahva Arraba	15	(1)
2017–2018	Ihud Bnei Kafr Qara	18	(1)
2018–2019	Maccabi Umm al-Fahm	24	(13)
2019–2020	Tubas		
2020–2021	Maccabi Umm al-Fahm	12	(0)
2021–2022	Hapoel Baqa al-Gharbiyye	1	(0)
2022–	Hapoel Iksal	1	(0)

International career
2010–2012	Palestine	12	(1)
- * Club domestic league appearances and goals

Mohammed Jamal Jebreen (Arabic: محمد جمال جبارين), simply known as Mohammed Jamal, is a professional footballer who plays as a winger for Hapoel Iksal. Born in Israel, he represented the Palestine national team.

== International career ==
He received his first call up to the Palestine national football team in 2010 against Sudan. He has since played for Palestine at the 2010 WAFF Championship, the qualifying rounds of 2012 AFC Challenge Cup, and the 2012 AFC Challenge Cup finals. He scored his first goal for the national team on his debut against Sudan.

== Career statistics ==
=== International ===
#	Date	Venue	Opponent	Score	Result	Competition
1.	4 June 2010	Khartoum Stadium, Omdurman, Sudan	Sudan	1–1	1–1	Friendly
