= Hashem Abd al-Rahman =

Mayor of Umm al-Fahm

- هاشم عبد الرحمن
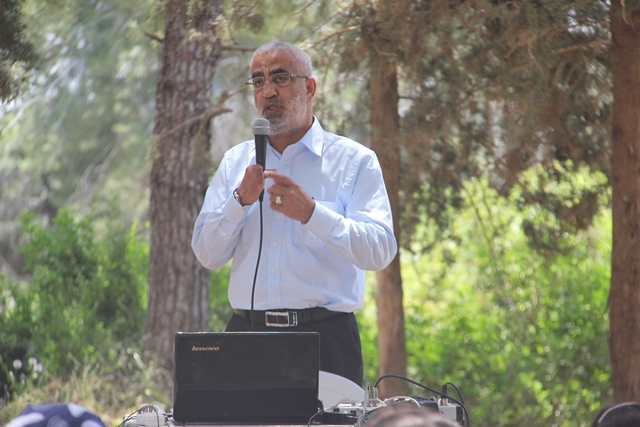
- Hashem Abd al-Rahman

Mayor of Umm al-Fahm
- In office 2003–2008
- Preceded by: Suleiman Aghbariyya
- Succeeded by: Khaled Aghbariyya

Personal details
- Party: Islamic Movement
- Education: Hebron University
- Profession: Politician

Sheikh Hashem Abd al-Rahman (Arabic: هاشم عبد الرحمن) also known as Hashem Abdul Rahman, was mayor of Umm al-Fahm, an Israeli Arab city in the Wadi Ara region of Israel.

A member of the Islamic Movement party in Israel, al-Rahman served as deputy mayor between 1989 and 1998. During Abd al-Rahman's term a project was inaugurated to boost Jewish tourism to Umm al-Fahm.
