= Asim Abu Shakra =

Palestinian artist

Asim Abu Shakra (Arabic: عاصم أبو شقرة, also transliterated Asim Abu Shaqra, Asem Abu Shaqra, 'Asim Abu Shaqra, Assem Abu Shakra) (1961–1990) was a Palestinian artist. Among his works are paintings of potted cacti inspired by his state of exile as a Palestinian living in Israel.

== Biography ==
Asim Abu Shakra was born in 1961 in the village of Umm el-Fahm in the Jenin district. He was the seventh of ten children in a Muslim family.

From 1982 to 1986, Abu Shakra studied at the Kalisher Art School in Tel Aviv. Afterwards, he continued to live and work in the city, and although he was able to access an international art scene, Abu Shakra felt a perpetual sense of alienation as a Palestinian living in exile that was echoed in his paintings. His friend, Ron Gang, reflected in a 2003 interview, “Asim identified completely with the Palestinian cause."

Abu Shakra died in 1990 due to cancer. Since his death, Israeli institutions like the Tel Aviv Museum of Art have portrayed his cactus series as Israeli symbols despite his refusal of such interpretations during his lifetime.

To Palestinians, the cactus series symbolizes the plight of Palestinians in exile as well as Abu Shakra's personal experiences. The depiction of cacti as potted plants further reflects resistance to uprooting.
