= Bayt Naqquba =

Arab village in Mandatory Palestine

Bayt Naqquba بيت نقّوبة Beit Nakuba
- Etymology: The house of the mountain pass
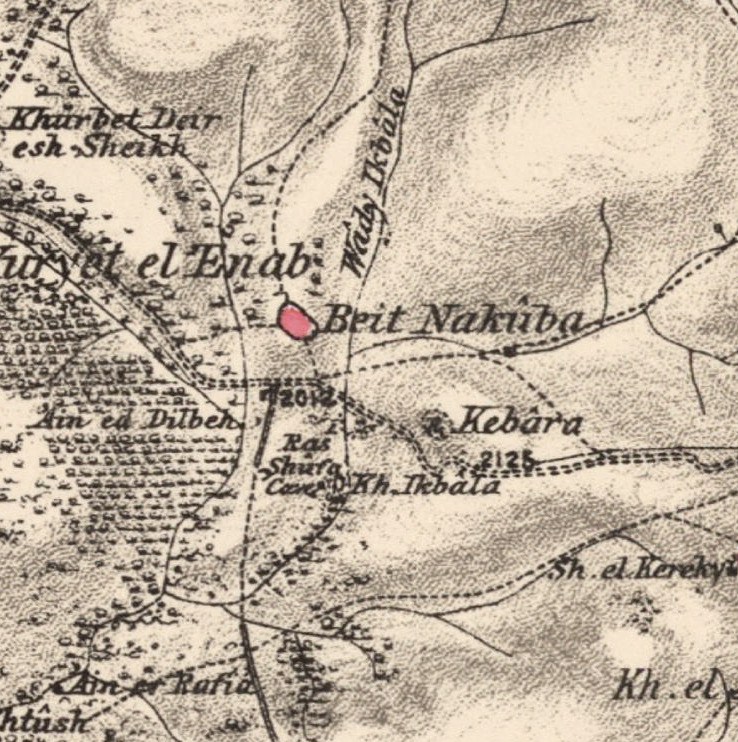
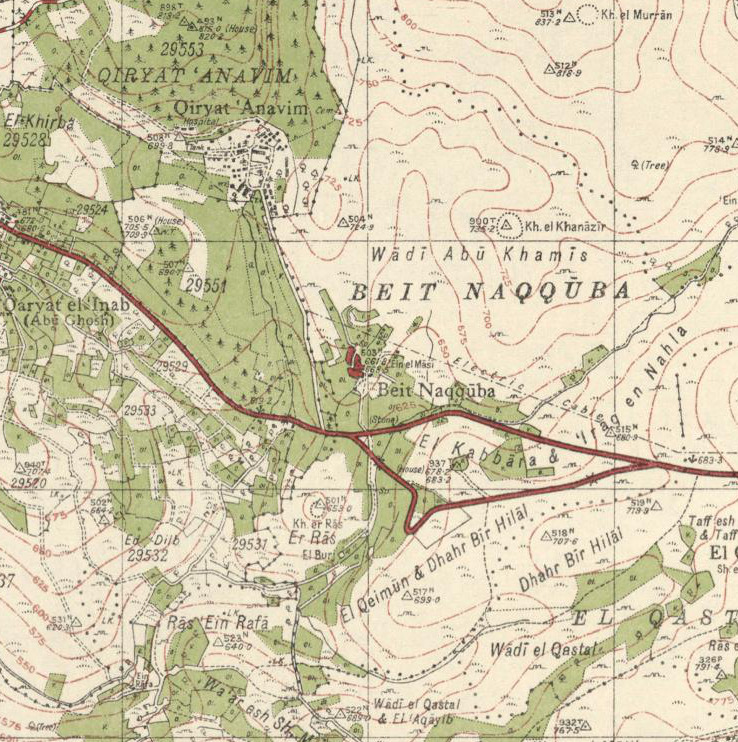
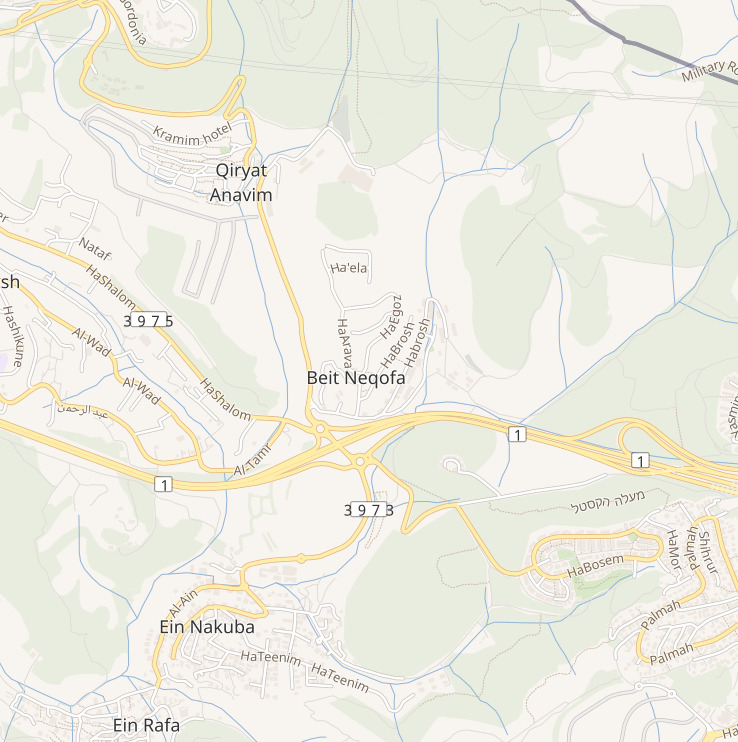
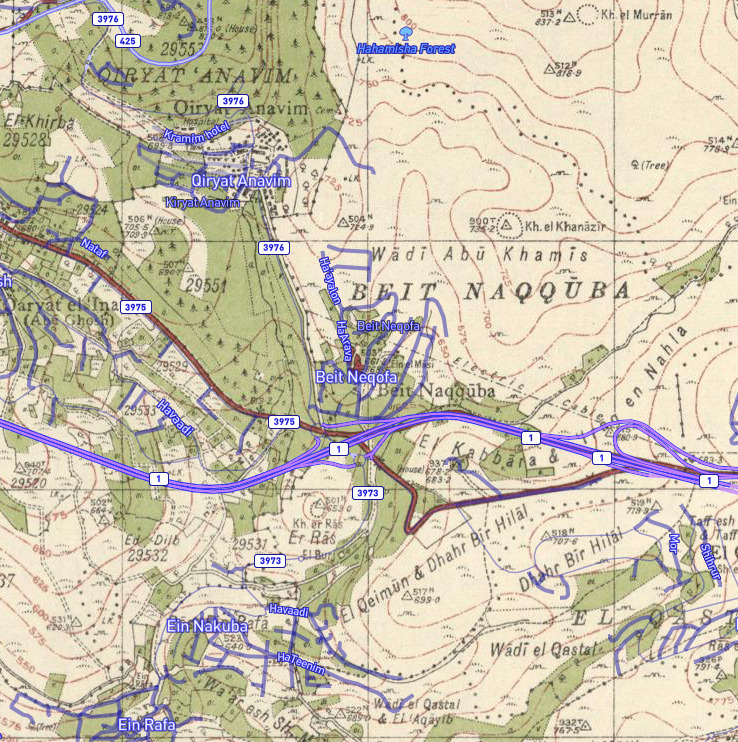
- 1870s map 1940s map modern map 1940s with modern overlay map A series of historical maps of the area around Bayt Naqquba (click the buttons)

- Location within Mandatory Palestine
- Coordinates: 31°48′11″N 35°07′33″E
- Palestine grid: 161/134
- Geopolitical entity: Mandatory Palestine
- Subdistrict: Jerusalem
- Date of depopulation: early April 1948

Area
  - Total: 2.9 km^{2} (1.1 sq mi)

Population (1948)
  - Total: 278
- Cause(s) of depopulation: Military assault by Yishuv forces
- Current Localities: Beit Nekofa

Bayt Naqquba (Arabic: بيت نقّوبة, Hebrew: בית נקובא, also spelled Bait Naqquba) was a Palestinian village in British Mandate Palestine, located 9.5 kilometers west of Jerusalem, near Abu Ghosh. Before Palmach and Haganah troops occupied the village during Operation Nachshon on April 11, 1948, approximately 300 Palestinian Arabs lived there. After the 1948 Arab–Israeli War, a moshav named Beit Nekofa was founded close to the site by Jewish immigrants from Yugoslavia. In 1962, residents of Bayt Naqubba built a new village named Ein Naqquba, south of Beit Nekofa.

== History ==
In 1838 Beit Nikoba was noted as a Muslim village in the District of Beni Malik, west of Jerusalem.

In 1863 Victor Guérin found the village located on cultivated slopes and inhabited with 200 inhabitants, while an Ottoman village list from about 1870 found 23 houses and a population of 88, though that population count included men only.

In 1883, the PEF's Survey of Western Palestine (SWP) described Bayt Naqquba as a village built on a slope with a spring to the south.

Around 1896 the population of Bet Nakuba was estimated to be about 135 persons.

=== British Mandate era ===
In the 1922 census of Palestine, during the early British Mandate of Palestine period, there were 120 villagers, all Muslims, increasing in the 1931 census to 177 Muslims, in 41 houses.

The villagers planted olive trees and vineyards, which grew mainly west of the village and on the valley floors, and irrigated their crops with water drawn from the village springs. Olive trees covered 194 dunum of land. In the 1944/5 statistics, the village had a population of 240 Muslims, and the total land area was 2,797 dunams. 303 dunums were irrigated or used for orchards, 515 dunams were for cereals, while 9 dunams were built-up (urban) Arab land.

=== 1948, and after ===
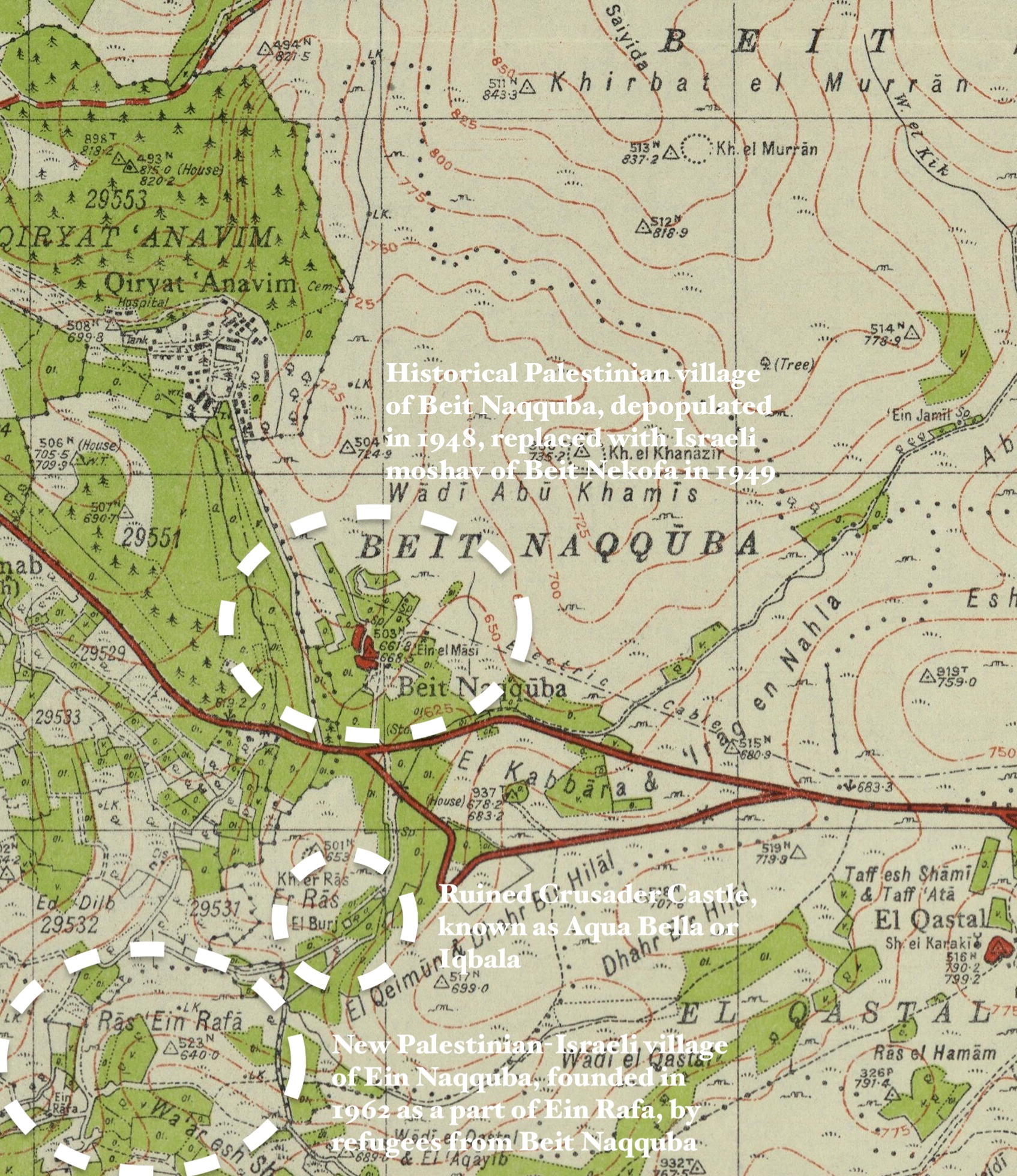
The historical village lands of Beit Naqquba as shown in this 1940s Survey of Palestine map; the village was depopulated in 1948 (its inhabitants returning to create Ein Naqquba in 1962) and was replaced by the moshav of Beit Nekofa.

Like the people of Abu Ghosh, the inhabitants of Bayt Naqquba were known for their friendly relations with their Jewish neighbors in Kibbutz Kiryat Anavim. Benny Morris writes: "It is possible that the inhabitants of Beit Naqquba had received both an order to evacuate from Arab military commanders in Ein Karim and "strong advice" to the same effect from Lisser and Navon. But it is likely that the "advice" given in the name of the Harel Brigade, which physically controlled the area, was more potent of the two factors in precipitating the evacuation." The village was taken around the 11 April 1948 during Operation Nachshon.

Between 1948 and 1964 the inhabitants of Bayt Naqquba lived at Sataf, "under trees, because the Arabs had not allowed them to come over their lines, out of distrust and revenge". Afterwards they were allowed to stay temporarily in Abu Ghosh. In 1962, they established a new village, Ein Naqquba on some of their land south of the Jerusalem-Tel Aviv highway.

=== The village today ===
A few houses are used either as dwellings or as stables. These houses were built of stone and many had domed roofs. Stones recovered from the ruins of the village houses have been used as steps for entrances to new Jewish homes. Almond and olive trees and cactuses cover the village site. In what was probably a unique case among all the villages occupied and depopulated, a new Arab village with the same name was established south of the original site in 1962, and some refugees from the old village were allowed to live there. The old village cemetery lies about 0.5 km south of the village site. It is maintained by a more recent Arab village.

== See also ==
- Depopulated Palestinian locations in Israel
- Jerusalem District

== Bibliography ==
- Barron, J. B., ed. (1923). Palestine: Report and General Abstracts of the Census of 1922. Government of Palestine.
- Conder, C.R.; Kitchener, H. H. (1883). The Survey of Western Palestine: Memoirs of the Topography, Orography, Hydrography, and Archaeology. Vol. 3. London: Committee of the Palestine Exploration Fund.
- Department of Statistics (1945). Village Statistics, April, 1945. Government of Palestine.
- Guérin, V. (1868). Description Géographique Historique et Archéologique de la Palestine (in French). Vol. 1: Judee, pt. 1. Paris: L'Imprimerie Nationale.
- Hadawi, S. (1970). Village Statistics of 1945: A Classification of Land and Area ownership in Palestine. Palestine Liberation Organization Research Centre.
- Hartmann, M. (1883). "Die Ortschaftenliste des Liwa Jerusalem in dem türkischen Staatskalender für Syrien auf das Jahr 1288 der Flucht (1871)". Zeitschrift des Deutschen Palästina-Vereins. 6: 102–149.
- Khalidi, W. (1992). All That Remains: The Palestinian Villages Occupied and Depopulated by Israel in 1948. Washington D.C.: Institute for Palestine Studies. ISBN 0-88728-224-5.
- Mills, E., ed. (1932). Census of Palestine 1931. Population of Villages, Towns and Administrative Areas. Jerusalem: Government of Palestine.
- Morris, B. (1994). "8". 1948 and after; Israel and the Palestinians. Oxford University Press. pp. Ghosh and Beit Naqquba, Al Fureidis and Jisr Zarka. ISBN 0-19-827929-9.
- Morris, B. (2004). The Birth of the Palestinian Refugee Problem Revisited. Cambridge University Press. ISBN 978-0-521-00967-6.
- Palmer, E. H. (1881). The Survey of Western Palestine: Arabic and English Name Lists Collected During the Survey by Lieutenants Conder and Kitchener, R. E. Transliterated and Explained by E.H. Palmer. Committee of the Palestine Exploration Fund.
- Robinson, E.; Smith, E. (1841). Biblical Researches in Palestine, Mount Sinai and Arabia Petraea: A Journal of Travels in the year 1838. Vol. 3. Boston: Crocker & Brewster.
- Schick, C. (1896). "Zur Einwohnerzahl des Bezirks Jerusalem". Zeitschrift des Deutschen Palästina-Vereins. 19: 120–127.
- Socin, A. (1879). "Alphabetisches Verzeichniss von Ortschaften des Paschalik Jerusalem". Zeitschrift des Deutschen Palästina-Vereins. 2: 135–163.

== See also ==
- Welcome Bayt Naquba
- Bayt Naqquba, Zochrot
- Survey of Western Palestine, Map 17: IAA, Wikimedia commons
- Bayt Naqquba from the Khalil Sakakini Cultural Center
