= Beit Nekofa =

Beit Nekofa: בית נקופה (Hebrew)
- Moshav
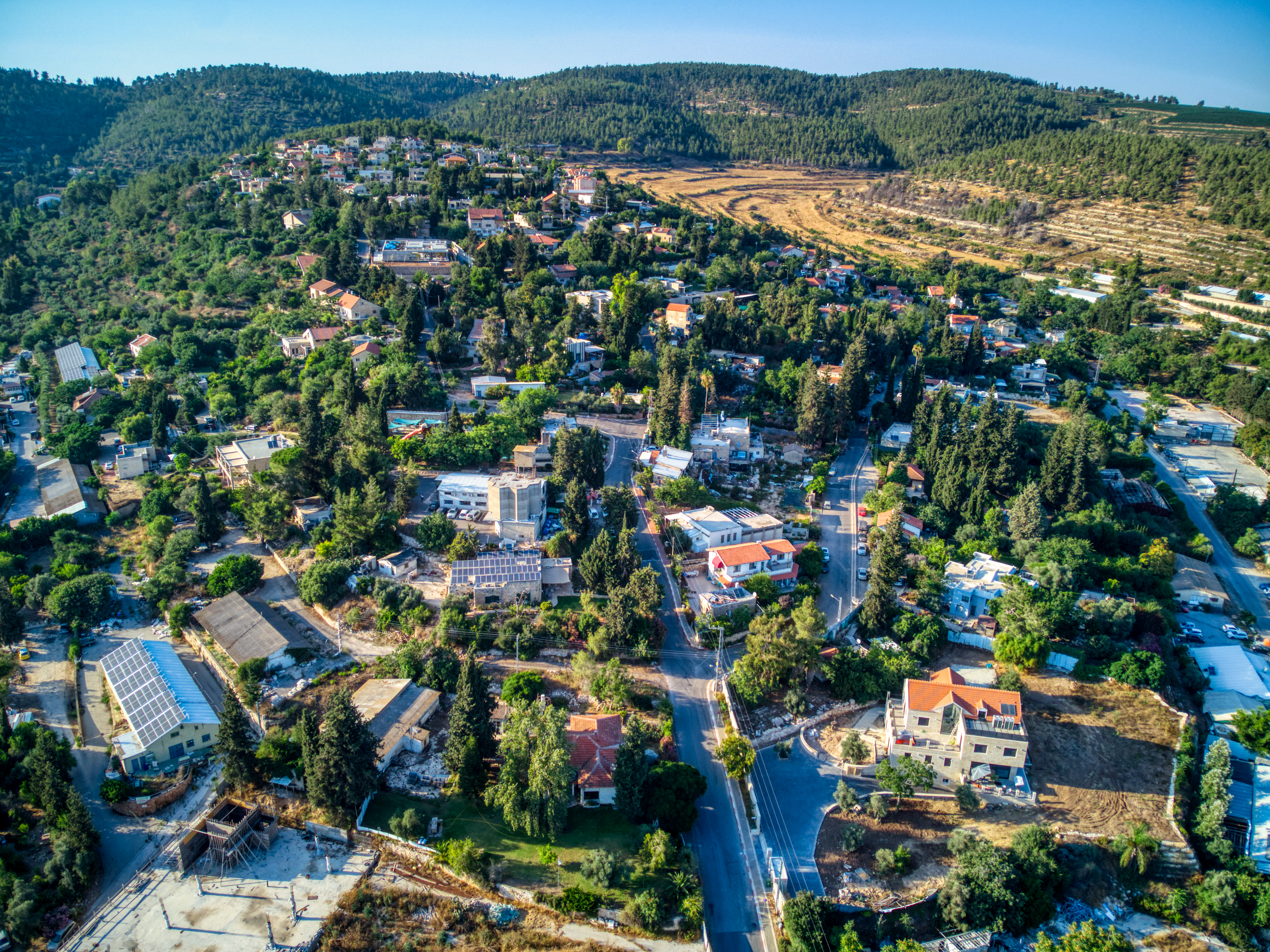

- Location within Jerusalem District Location within Israel
- Coordinates: 31°48′10″N 35°7′31″E
- Country: Israel
- District: Jerusalem
- Council: Mateh Yehuda
- Affiliation: Moshavim Movement
- Founded: August 1949
- Founder: Yugoslav Jews
- Population (2024): 675

Beit Nekofa (Hebrew: בית נקופה) is a moshav in central Israel. Located in the Jerusalem Corridor, about 10 km west of central Jerusalem, next to Highway 1 and the Hemed Interchange, between Mevaseret Zion and Kiryat Ye'arim, south of Kiryat Anavim, it falls under the jurisdiction of Mateh Yehuda Regional Council. In 2024 it had a population of 675.

== Etymology ==
Beit Nekofa's name may be based on the name of an ancient town, Nukveta (Hebrew: נוּקְבְתָא) of Benjamin, mentioned in the Talmud, from which the ancestors of Rabbi Judah ha-Nasi are said to have come from. Nukveta is from the Hebrew word נִקְבָּה, Nikba, or tunnel.

According to Zev Vilnay, Beit Nekofa was mentioned in the Jerusalem Talmud as the place of residence of a family of Kohanim. The Hebrew root of the name is Nakaf (נ-ק-פ, taken from Isaiah 17:6), referring to the collection of olives by means of hitting the tree, as opposed to harvest by hand (the Hebrew root Masak).

In Arabic, Naqb means (mountain) passage. An Arab village, Bayt Naqquba, existed in the same location until the 1948 Arab–Israeli War when the area came under Israeli control and the villagers were expelled. After the end of the war, the residents were not allowed to return to their village, but they were allowed later, in 1962, to establish a new village, Ein Naqquba, on the opposite side of Highway 1.

== History ==
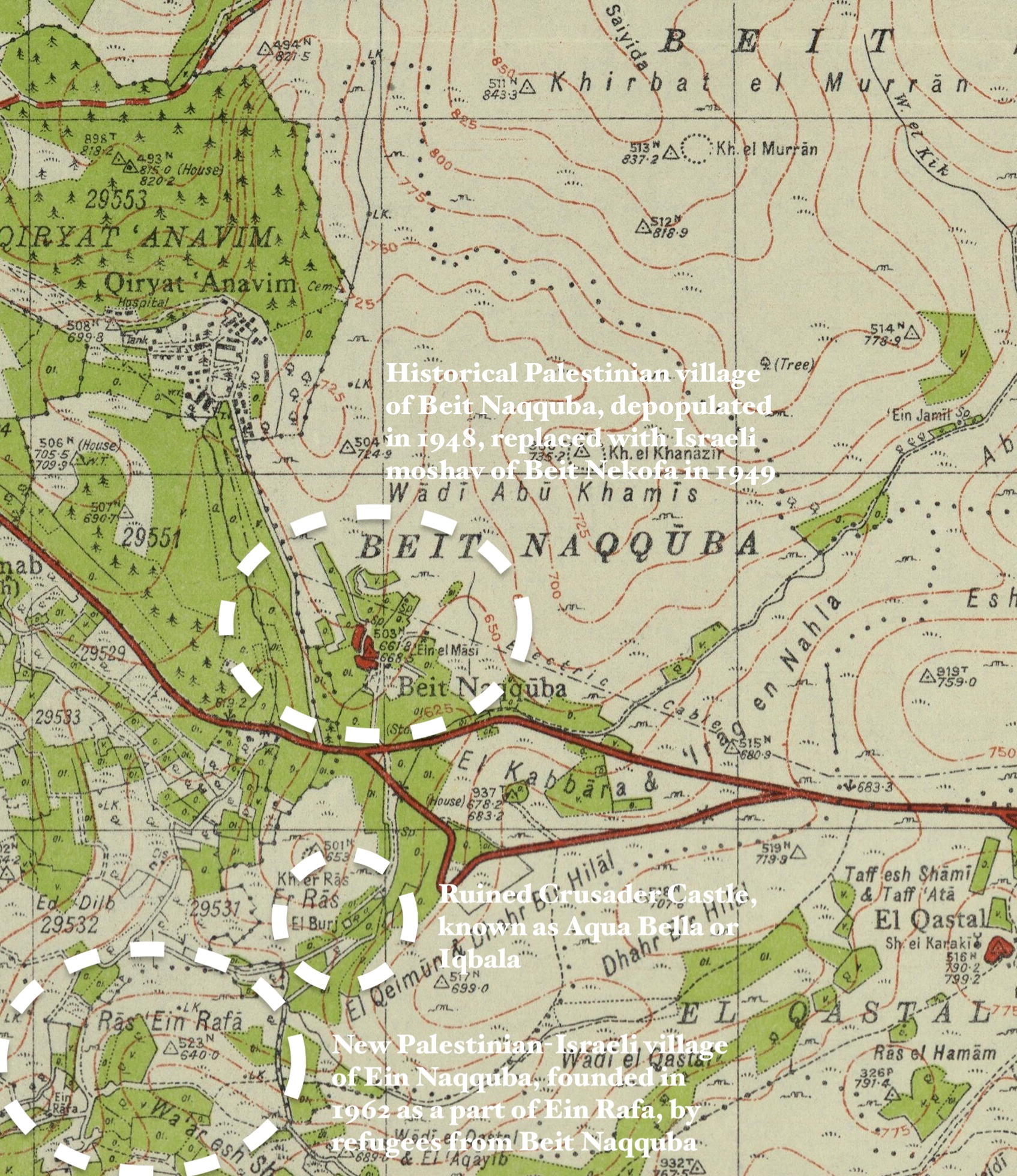
The historical village lands of Beit Naqquba as shown in this 1940s Survey of Palestine map; the village was depopulated in 1948 (its inhabitants returning to create Ein Naqquba in 1962) and was replaced by Beit Nekofa

Beit Nekofa was founded in August 1949 by seven families who immigrated to Israel from Yugoslavia. The Neveh Ilan-Beit Nekofa area was devastated by fire in the summer of 1996. Two thousand dunams of forest and dozens of buildings in Kiryat Anavim and Beit Nekofa were destroyed or damaged in the blaze.

Beit Nekofa runs a bronze foundry that employs many Arabs from the surrounding villages.

== Gallery ==
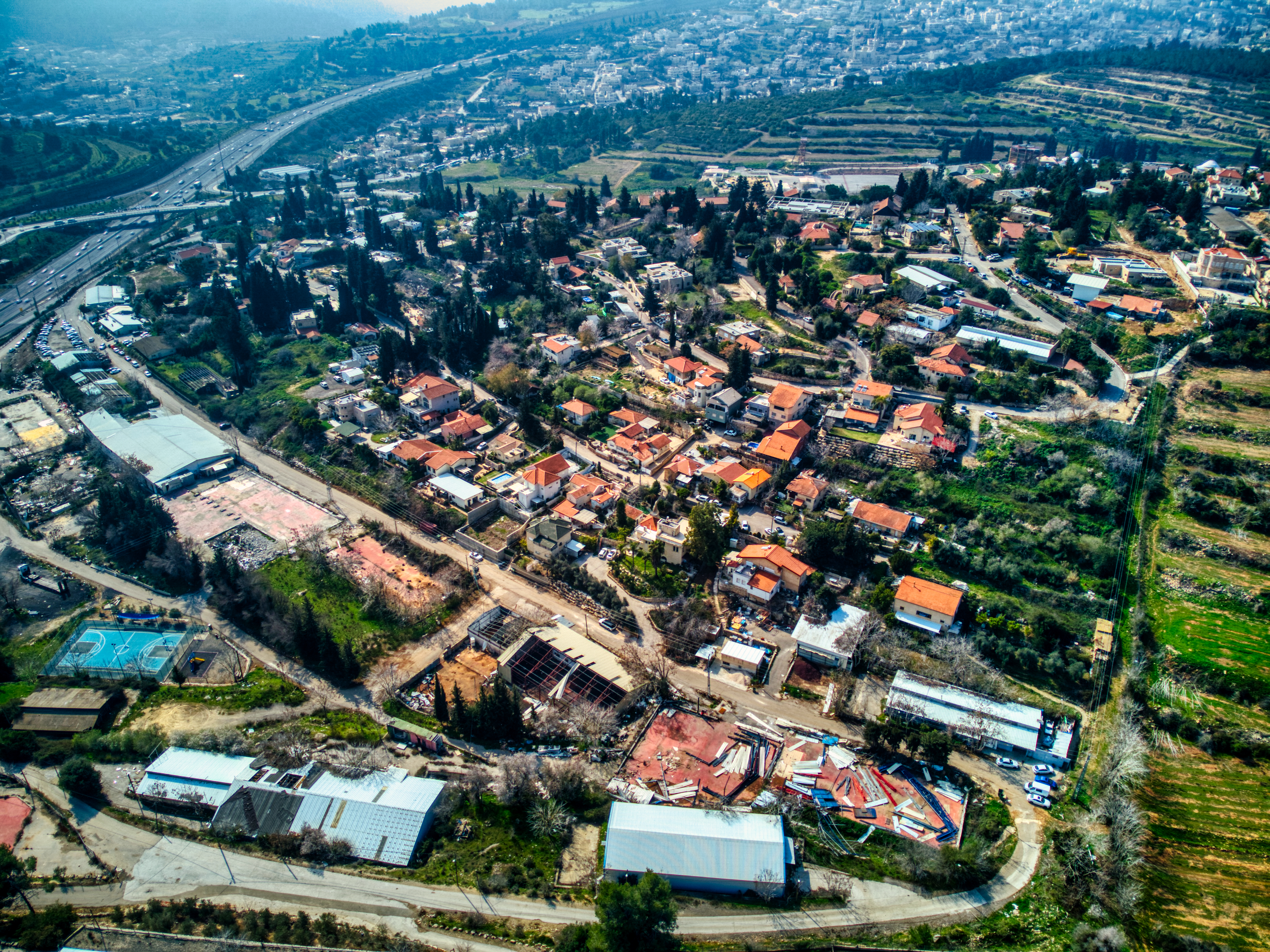
The lower, southern part of Beit Nekofa

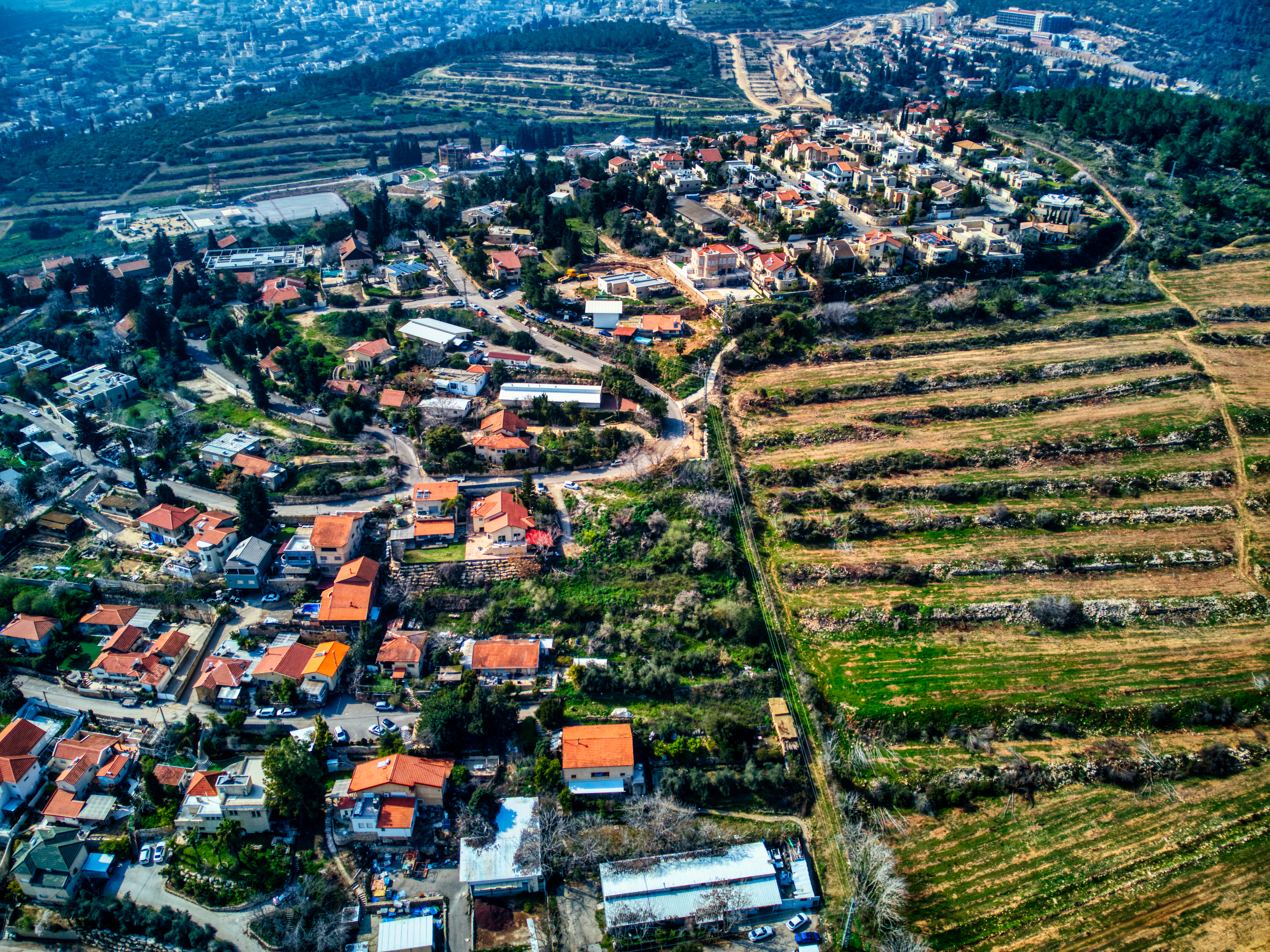
The upper, northern part of Beit Nekofa
