= Charles F. Tyrwhitt-Drake =

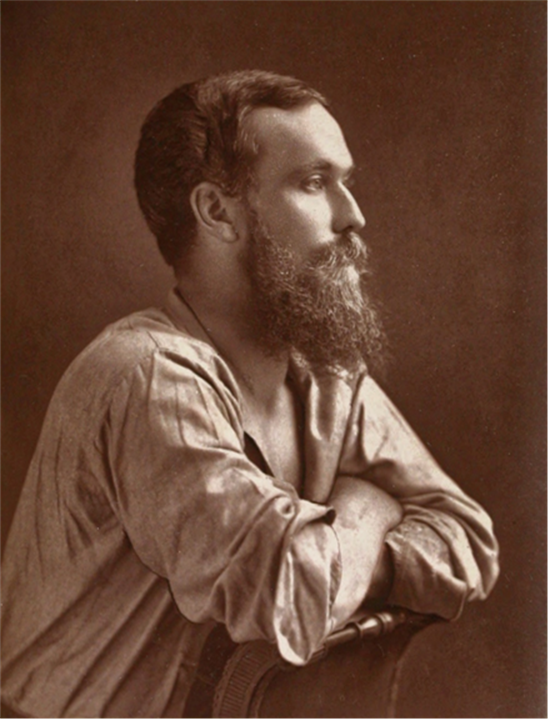
Charles Francis Tyrwhitt-Drake

Charles Frederick Tyrwhitt-Drake (2 January 1846 – 23 June 1874) was an explorer, naturalist, archaeologist, and linguist. He died during the PEF Survey of Palestine.

He was the youngest son of Colonel W. Tyrwhitt Drake.

He worked with the Palestine Exploration Fund in the East in the winter of 1870, in order to investigate the Hama inscriptions.

In May 7 1873 he participated in the consecration of the first known masonic lodge in Palestine “Royal Solomon Mother Lodge N° 293” in Zedekiah cave Jerusalem as acting secretary.

He died of fever on 23 June 1874 at Jerusalem, Ottoman Empire, aged only 28.

Richard Francis Burton wrote after his death that: "He was my inseparable companion during the rest of our stay in Palestine, and never did I travel with any man whose disposition was so well adapted to make a first-rate explorer".

== Publications ==
- 'Notes on the Birds of Tangier and Eastern Morocco’ (‘Ibis,’ 1867, p. 421); ‘Further Notes’ on the same (‘Ibis,’ 1869, p. 147);
- The map, illustrations, and sketches to accompany Professor Palmer's account of the Desert of Tih (Palestine Exploration Fund April 1871);
- Burton, R. F.; Tyrwhitt-Drake, C. F. (1872). Unexplored Syria: Visits to the Libanus, the Tulúl el Safá, the Anti-Libanus, the northern Libanus, and the 'Aláh. Vol. 2. Tinsley Brothers.
- Drake, Charles Frederick Tyrwhitt (1877). The Literary Remains of the Late Charles F. Tyrwhitt Drake. R. Bentley.
- Tyrwhitt-Drake, Charles F. (1872). "Mr. Tyrwhitt-Drake's reports". Quarterly Statement - Palestine Exploration Fund. 4: 7-11, 36-46, 77-91, 174-193.
