= Tayseer Barakat =

Palestinian painter (b. 1959)

- تيسير بركات
- Born: 1959 (age 66–67); Jabalia refugee camp near Jabalia, Gaza Strip
- Other names: Tyseer Barakat, Taysir Barakat, Tysir Barakat
- Education: Faculty of Fine Arts, Alexandria University (BA)
- Occupations: Painter, draftsperson, installation artist, writer, curator, gallery–cafe owner
- Organization: League of Palestinian Artists
- Movement: New Visions
- Website: tayseerbarakat.com

Tayseer Barakat (Arabic: تيسير بركات; born 1959) is a Palestinian painter, curator, and writer. He also owns a gallery–cafe in Ramallah, where he lives. Barakat was one of the founding members of the League of Palestinian Artists in 1973, and the New Vision art group and movement during the First Intifada.

== Early life and education ==
Tayseer Barakat was born in 1959, in the Jabalia refugee camp near Jabalia in the Gaza Strip. His family was from al-Majdal, a village in the Lower Galilee region. As a young adult he moved to the West Bank.

Barakat graduated with a B.A. degree from at the Faculty of Fine Arts, Alexandria University (formerly Helwan University, Alexandria), he attended from 1978 to 1983.

== Career ==
After graduation, he worked at a UNWRA-led women’s teacher training center in Ramallah. He primarily works in the mediums of painting and drawing. Much of his artwork depicts images of flight or escape.

Barakat was one of the founding members of the League of Palestinian Artists (Arabic: رابطة الفنانين الفلسطينيين) art collective in 1973, the other founding artists included Karim Dabbah, Taysir Sharaf, Nabil Anani, Kamel Mughanni, Vera Tamari, Fathi Ghabin, Issam Badr, Suleiman Mansour, Fatin Tubasi, Samira Badran, and Yusuf Duwayk. The group wanted to created Palestinian visual art on native land.

In 1987, the New Visions (Arabic: نحو التجريب والإبداء, romanized: Nahwa al-Tajrib wa al-Ibda') art collective and movement founded by Barakat, Vera Tamari, Sliman Mansour, and Nabil Anani, and it was formed in response to the First Intifada (1987–1993). As a group they had pledge to make art with naturally found materials, in order to divest from spending money on Israeli art supplies. During this period Barakat began to work with materials such as local clay (and he added hay for consistency), wood and fire.

Barakat founded in 1997 the Ziryab Gallery and Cafe in Ramallah, where he also worked as an art curator.

Barakat's artwork is found in museum collections, including at the British Museum in London; Umm al-Fahm Art Gallery in Umm al-Fahm, Israel; and the Jordan National Gallery of Fine Arts in Amman.

== Exhibitions ==
- 1996, 23rd São Paulo Art Biennial, group exhibition, São Paulo, Brazil
- 2003, Made in Palestine!, traveling group exhibition, Station Museum of Contemporary Art, Houston, Texas, U.S.; featuring artists Samia Halaby, Mary Tuma, Muhammad Rakouie, Zuhdi al Adawi, Emily Jacir, and Tayseer Barakat
- 2005, Made in Palestine!, traveling group exhibition, SomArts Cultural Center, San Francisco, California, U.S.
- 2012, Refraction: Moving Images on Palestine, group exhibition, P21 Gallery, London, England; featuring artists: Mohammad Al-Hawajri, Kamal Aljafari, Tayseer Barakat, Mike Hoolboom, Khaled Hourani, Khaled Jarrar, Josh Jones, kennardphillipps, Inzajeano Latif, Manal Mahamid, Laila Shawa, Nasser Soumi, Tarzan and Arab Nasser.
- 2015, Narratives, at Zawyeh Gallery Ramallah; group exhibition featuring artists Abed Alem, Ahmad Kanaan, Amani Harhash, Asad Azzi, Irina Naji, Jawad Malhi, Marwa Najjar, Maisara Barood, Mohammad Khalil, Nabil Anani, Sana Bishara, Sliman Mansour, and Tayseer Barakat

== See also ==
- List of Palestinian painters
- New Visions
