= Watermelon as a Palestinian symbol =

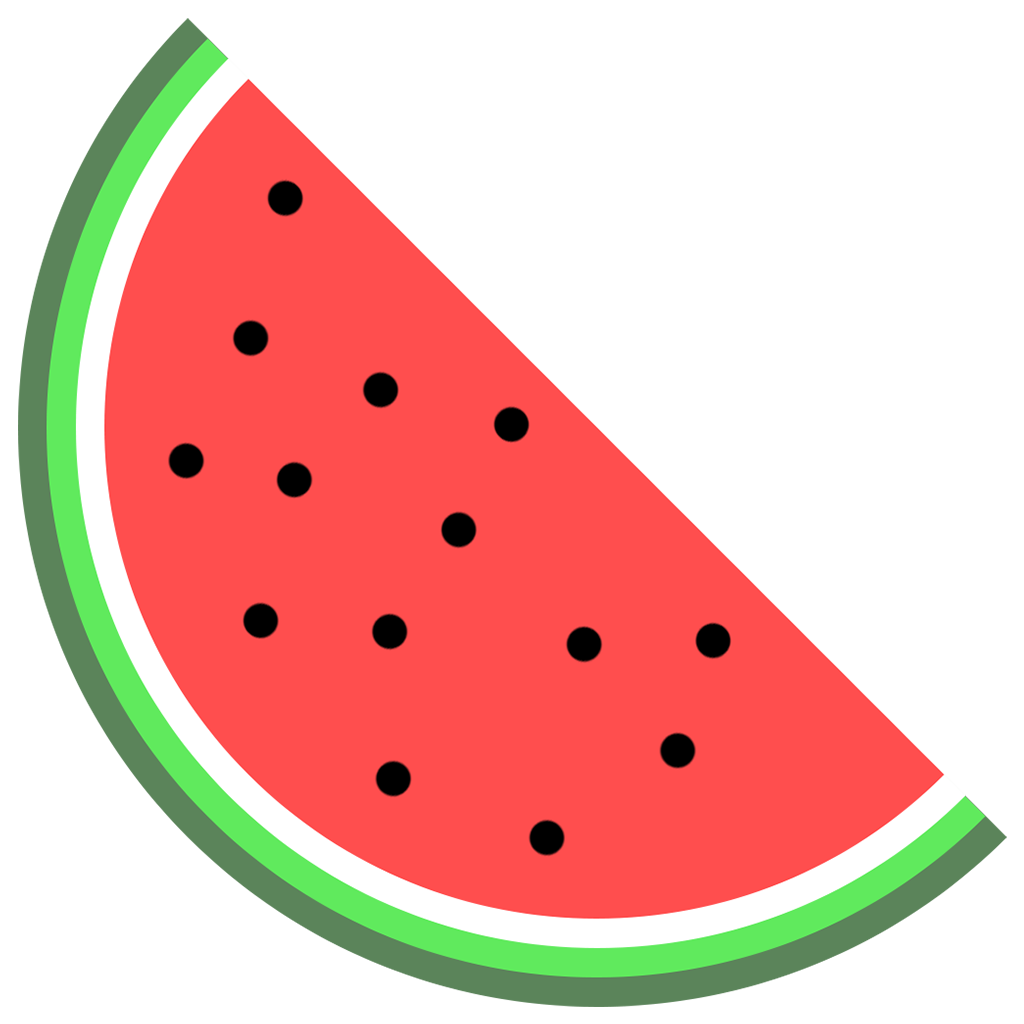
Watermelon symbol, often used as an emoji (🍉)

The watermelon (Levantine Arabic: بطيخ, romanized: baṭṭīkh) has been used as a symbol of Palestinian perseverance and resistance in protests and works of art, representing the Palestinian cause in the context of the Israeli–Palestinian conflict. It started being used as such in response to Israeli suppression of the display of the Palestinian flag after the 1967 war, as the watermelon has the same colors as the flag: red, green, white, and black.

== Origins ==
The flag of Palestine is colored in the Pan-Arab colors of red, green, white and black. In 1980, the IDF shut down Gallery 79, an art gallery in Ramallah founded by Issam Bader, displaying works by Sliman Mansour, Issam Bader, and Nabil Anani that incorporated the colors of the Palestinian flag. An Israeli officer told the artists that even painting a watermelon in the flag's colors would be confiscated. Mansour, one of the exhibitors, remembers a conversation with the Israeli officer who shut down the gallery: the officer banned the use of the colors of the Palestinian flag, and mentioned watermelons as an example of the use of the banned colors. Mansour recalled watermelon iconography only started being used in 2007, when Khaled Hourani created an image for a "Subjective Atlas of Palestine" project. Other artists who have used the watermelon include Sarah Hatahet, Sami Boukhari, Aya Mobaydeen and Beesan Arafat. There are reports of instances of Israeli forces banning the display of the flag, leading artists to use the watermelon in its place.

Under Israeli law, flying the Palestinian flag is not a crime. By law the flag is not allowed to be displayed when it is "used in support of terrorism or disrupts public order". Since 2014 Israeli police have been given the authority to confiscate a flag when used in a manner that violates the law. As of 2022 Israeli police have been routinely confiscating flags. In January 2023, Minister of National Security Itamar Ben-Gvir announced he had instructed the police to ban the flag's showcasing in public spaces. Israel's restriction on the Palestinian flag was criticized by Amnesty International as an attempt to legitimize racism, adding that the Palestinian flag has been used for the past decades as "a symbol of unity and resistance to Israel's unlawful occupation".

A flag of Palestine with a watermelon slice replacing the red triangle

In 1993, as part of the Oslo Accords, the flag was recognized by Israel as that of the Palestinian Authority. At the time, The New York Times claimed "young men were once arrested for carrying sliced watermelons", but Palestinian artist Sliman Mansour has cast doubt on the validity of these claims. A later editor's note to the article says "Given the ambiguity of the situation, The Times should either have omitted the anecdote or made it clear that the report was unconfirmed."

== Resurgence ==
In 2023, the Israeli Ministry of National Security banned the Palestinian flag in public places. In response, many Israelis displayed watermelon stickers with "This is not a Palestinian flag."

Since the outbreak of the Gaza war in 2023, the watermelon symbol has experienced a resurgence in popularity. Individuals have been leveraging it, often using watermelon emojis (U+1F349 🍉 WATERMELON) on various social media platforms to show support for Palestine. In particular, the symbol may be used to circumvent censorship and shadow banning on some platforms (a practice called "algospeak"), avoiding more overt symbols such as Palestinian flags. For example, when the Dutch MP Esther Ouwehand (Party for the Animals) was told to change her Palestinian flag shirt during a debate, she returned in a printed watermelon-themed shirt.

Training materials for the New York City Police Department categorized the watermelon, along with the kuffiyeh, as antisemitic symbols.

== Gallery ==
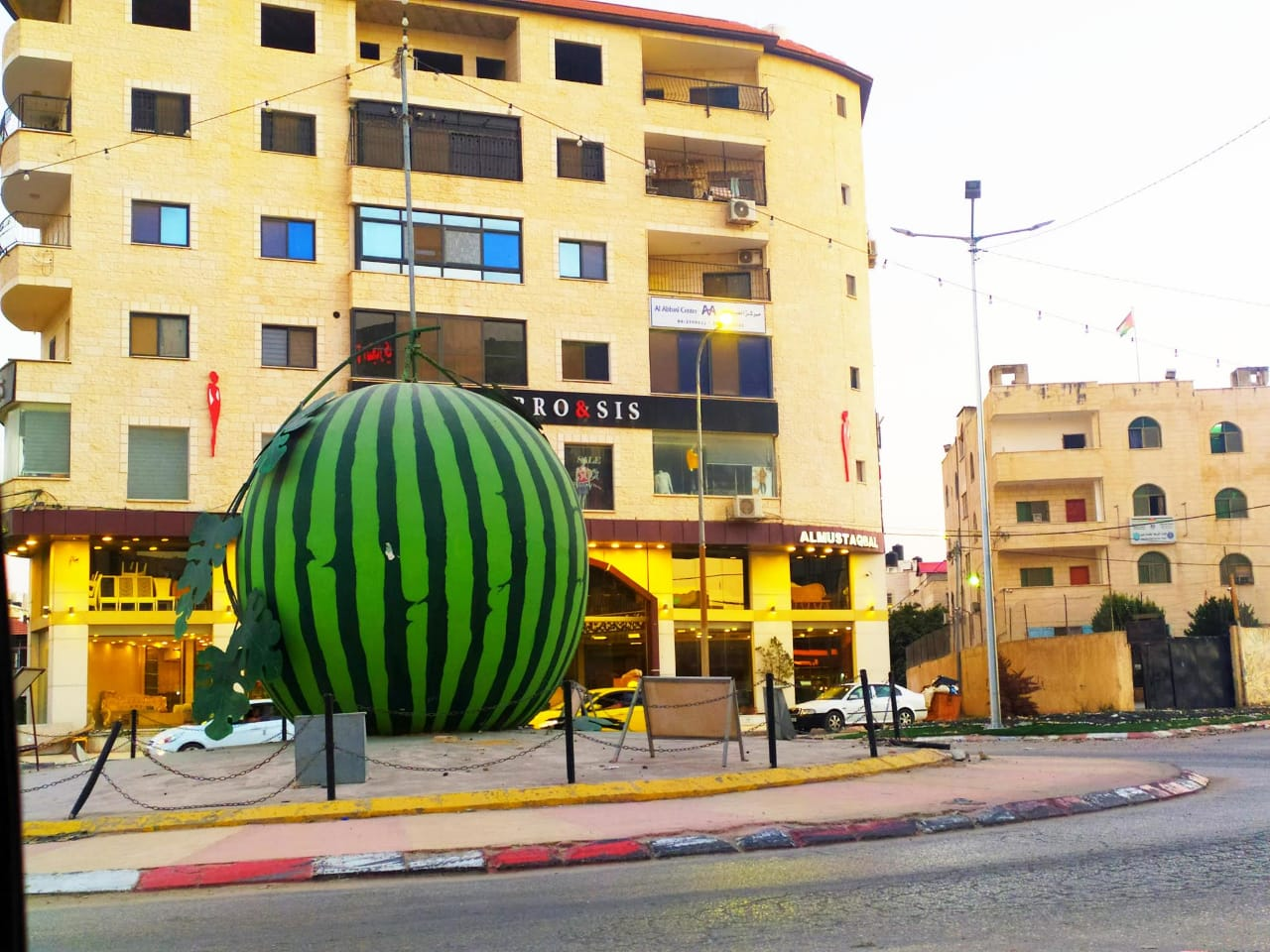
Watermelon sculpture at a roundabout in Jenin, Palestine (January 2021)

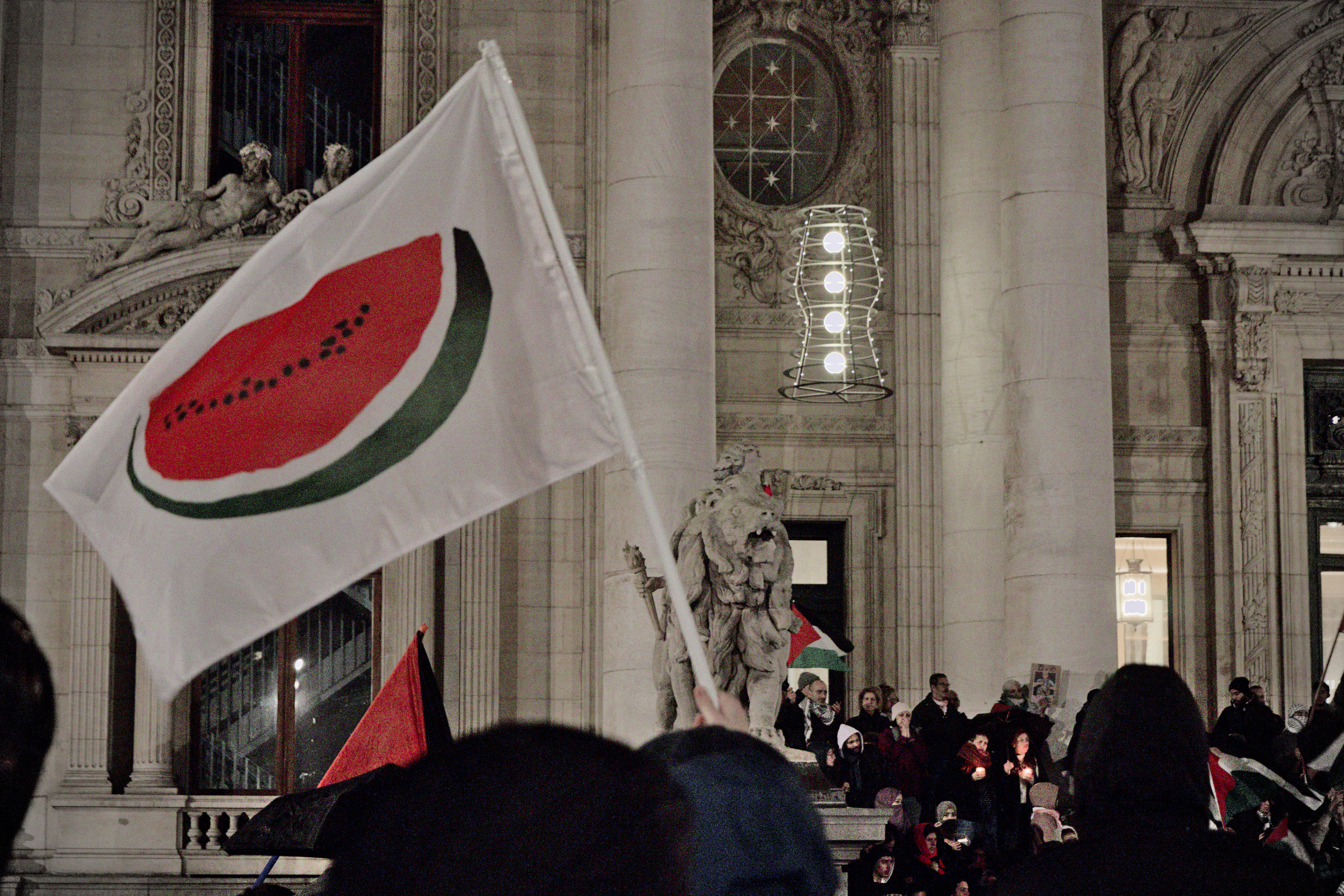
Solidarity gathering for Palestine in Brussels (2023)

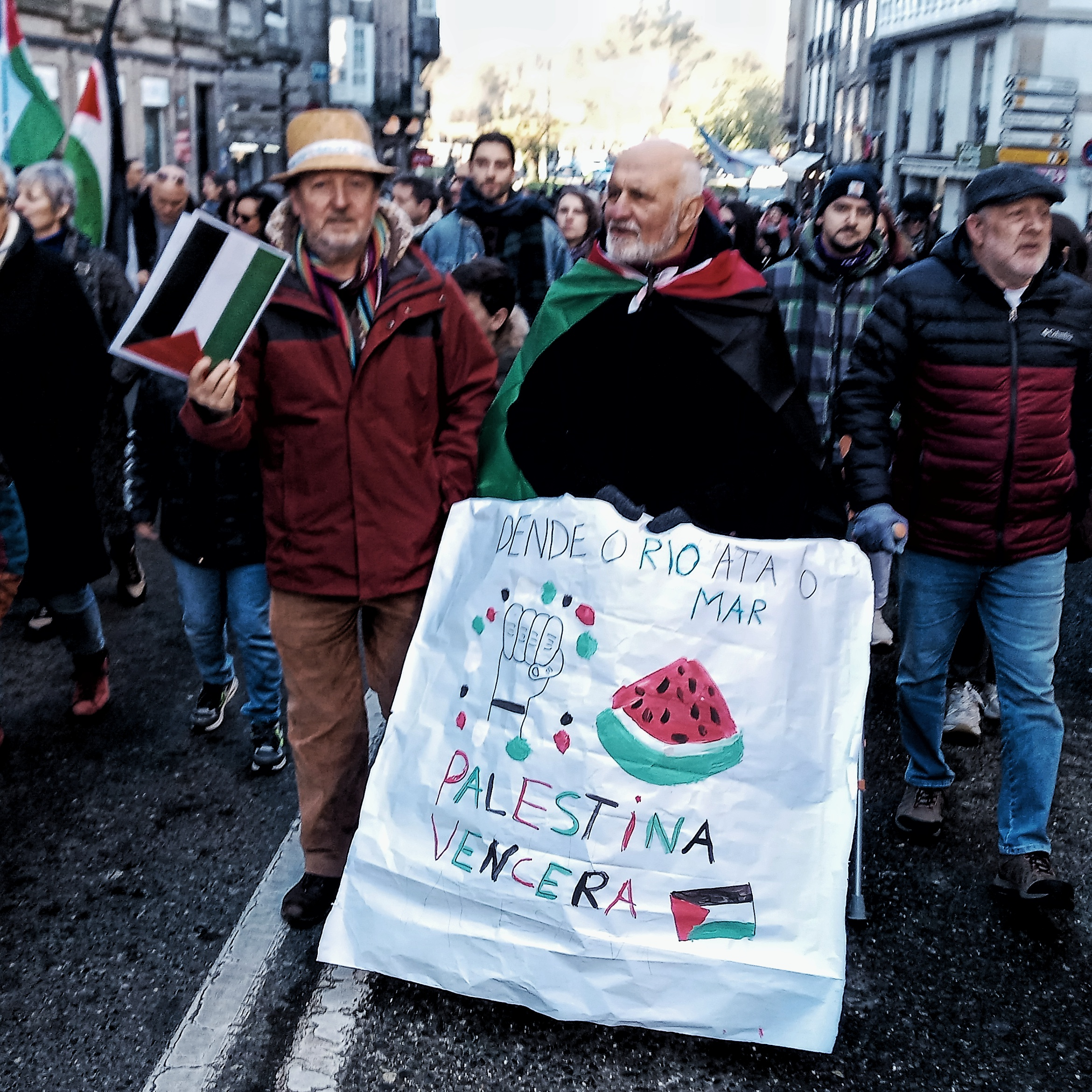
Pro-Palestine protest in Santiago de Compostela, Spain (17 December 2023)

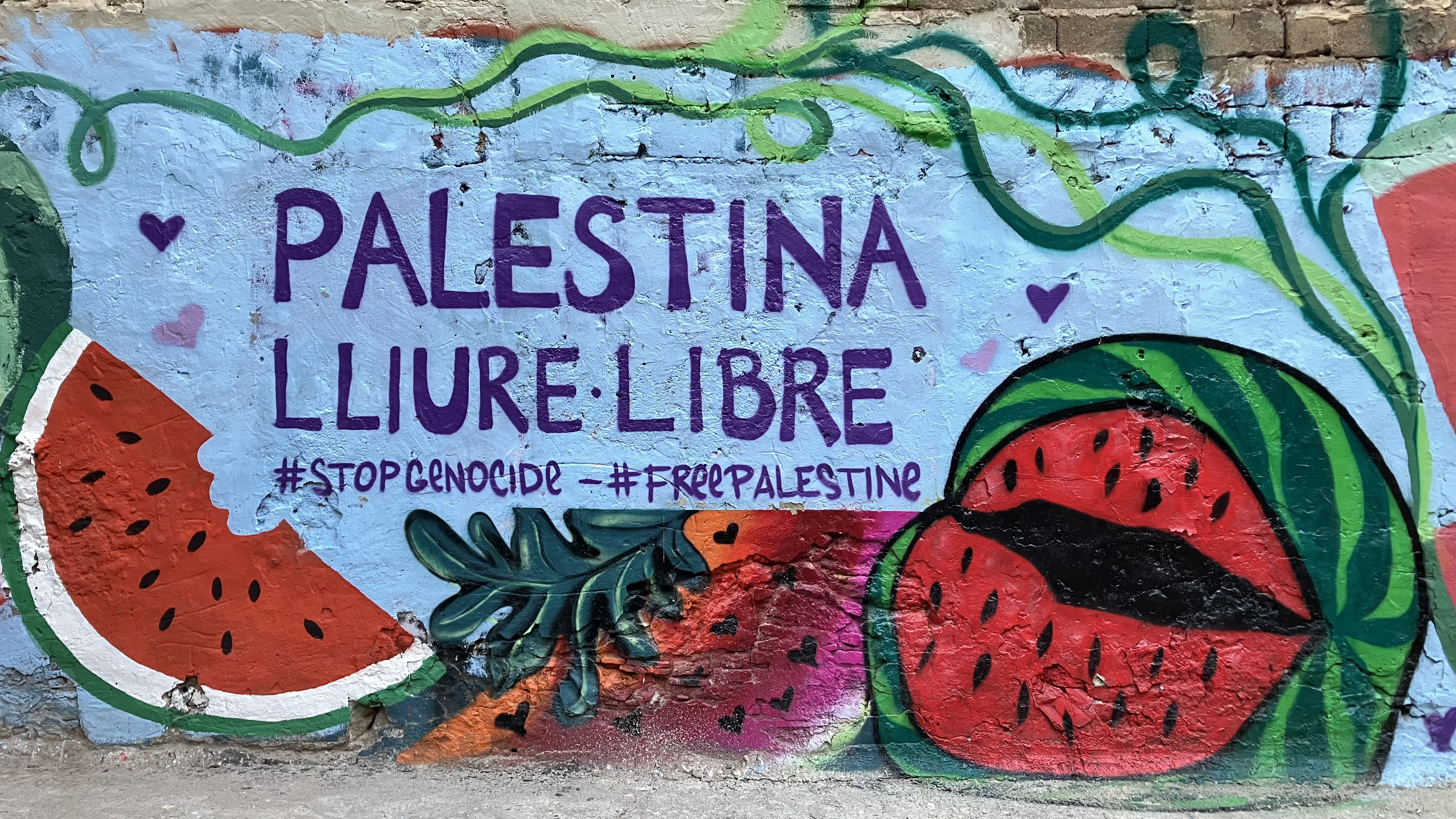
A mural painted on a wall in a street in Barcelona

== See also ==
- List of national symbols of Palestine
- Watermelon stereotype – Symbol of self-reliance for formerly enslaved African-American people (now primarily a racist stereotype)
- Kherson watermelon – Symbol of Kherson Oblast, Ukraine
- Freedom pineapples – Political response to Chinese import ban
- Husum Red Pied – Breed of domestic pig
