= Palestinian abstract art =

Palestinian abstract art is work originating from Palestine or produced by Palestinian artists in the diaspora, working in a medium that is not defined by reality. The visual language is not strictly defined by visual references in the world, characteristic of the genre of abstraction.

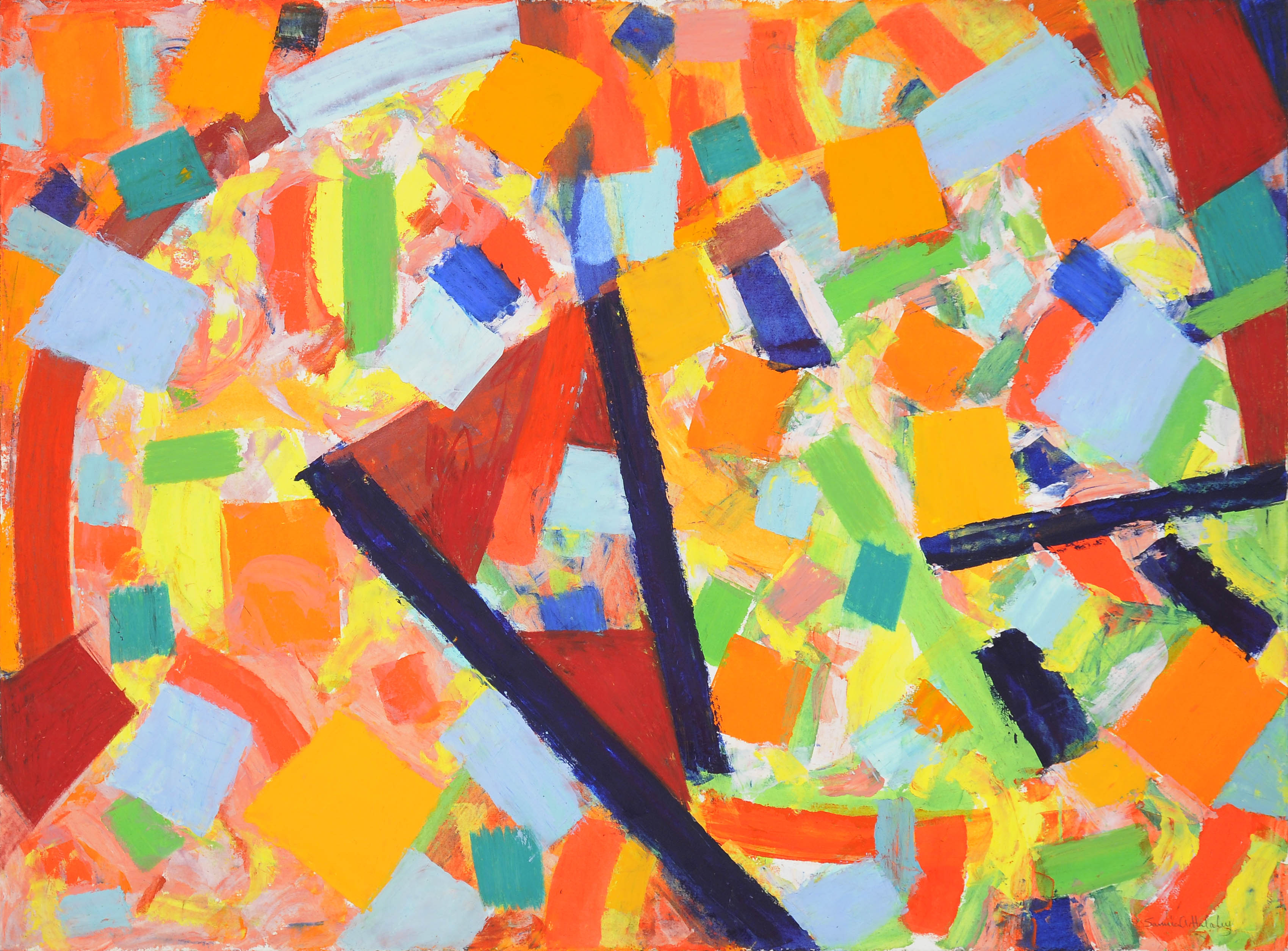
Samia Halaby, Prancing in the Vineyard, July 1982

Palestinian abstract art spans “over four major geographic centers: in the West Bank and Gaza, inside Israel, in the Palestinian diaspora in the Arab world, and in the Palestinian diaspora in Europe and the US". As a result of the diaspora and dissemination through media, the genre is characterized by its inspiration from Western abstract art, as well as drawing inspiration from traditional Islamic painting and classical Arabic traditions of geometry and calligraphy.

== Emergence of abstraction in Palestinian art ==
During the 1960s-1980s, Palestinian artists started to utilize principles and techniques of abstraction as a means of expression for their political and cultural struggles faced during occupation. Painting modes and methods of 20th century revolutionary movements were adopted by Palestinian artists associated with the liberation movement. The movement itself is deeply intertwined with broader revolutionary movements within the Middle East and Arab world. It has been argued that the development of abstraction in the 20th century was a result of revolutionary social movement during the region and era.

Other revolutionary movements and their art scenes were influential to pioneers in the Palestinian abstract art scene. Key Palestinian artists such as Mustafa Al-Hallaj and Sliman Mansour were influenced by their contemporaries in 20th century abstract art, especially cubism and Mexican Muralism. These artists adapted these techniques to their circumstances, reflecting the political and revolutionary realities of Palestine.

== Formal qualities ==
The characteristics of Palestinian abstract art draw their roots from Western abstract art, traditional Islamic painting, and classical Arabic traditions of geometry and calligraphy. Similarly to many of their contemporaries in the region, they took inspiration from Arab-Islamic history. It has been argued that there is a general preference for abstract art in all Muslim societies, as the form aids in symbolizing the "universal, transcendent, unity in multiplicity, and necessary being".

By tinkering with characteristics such as space, light, size, distance, location, and motion, the composition can exist with a degree of separation from reality. The art form aims to imitate the general principles in nature, not the appearance of them from one side at one moment in time. Palestinian abstract art centered more around popular symbols as opposed to a pure or total sense of abstraction. Art that could engage with the masses more directly and convey political messages was favored in its stead.

== Recurring themes ==
Within Palestinian art, researchers trace themes that appear after significant events that occur between Israel and Palestine. The Nakba was, in particular, a very influential event that appears in Palestinian abstract art because of the exile that occurred after the event. Palestinian artists in the diaspora created art where Palestinians felt the need to represent their culture beyond living in Palestine by usage of iconography such as flags or the Arabic language. Some artists go against that and create art that can be connected to any culture or person, with the hope that the viewer can relate to the art beyond the political conflicts within the artist’s home country.

== Prominent abstract artists ==
During the 20th century, three major artists contributed to modern Palestinian abstract art: Kamal Boullata, Steve Sabella, and Samia Halaby.

=== Kamal Boullata ===
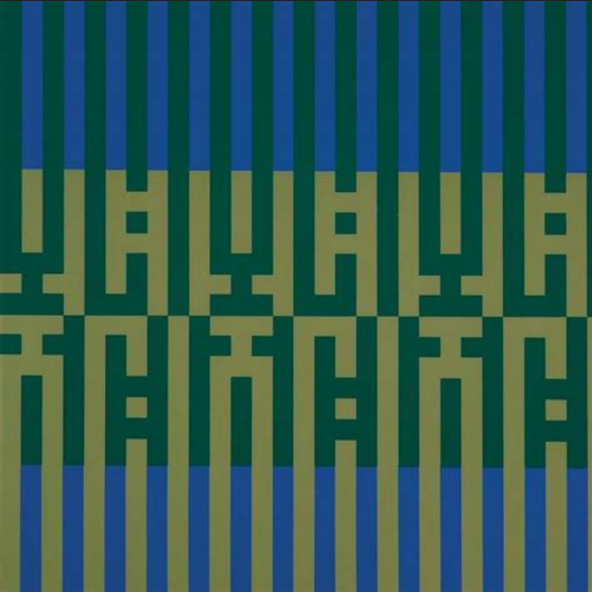
Kamal Boullata, there is no i but i, 2023

Boullata (born 1942, Jerusalem) spent his younger years painting, despite there being no art school within Jerusalem. Throughout his younger years, he leaned heavily on figuration within his art, but later in life he moved further into abstraction. His work relies prominently on geometric themes, taking inspiration from the Arabic Language and the divine meaning of shapes. With his essay To Measure Jerusalem: Explorations of the Square, he states that “a simple geometric form may be a product of discursive thought, color is from intuitive feeling”, explaining how he takes a rigid idea such at geometric shapes, and combines it with “intuitive feeling” to create an art piece that reflects his experience as a Palestinian man. His paintings mostly emerge within the late 20th century, following the Israeli occupation of Palestine his work displays themes of exile and Palestinian “light”, as seen through his use of the Arabic Language within his work. He believed that Palestinian history was inherently oral and that it transcends the need for words and concrete images, thus his usage of shapes and designs over literal images.

=== Steve Sabella ===
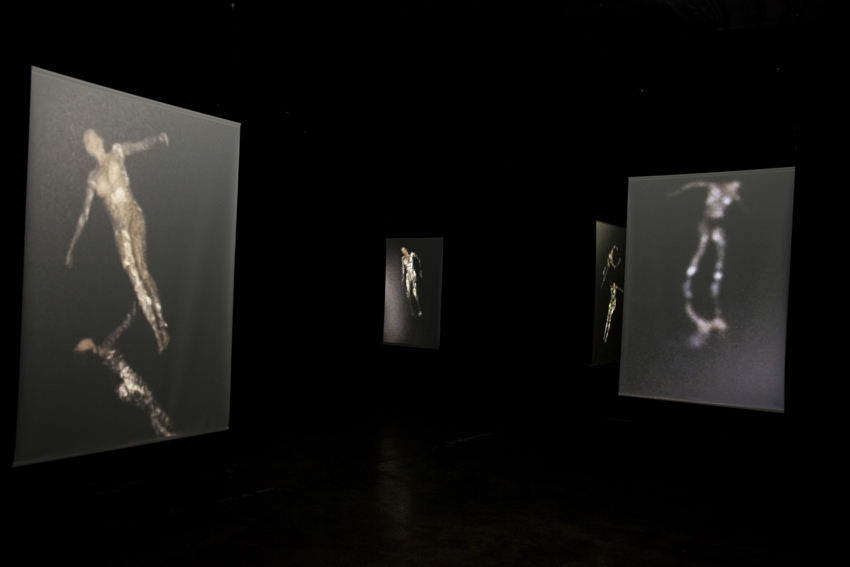
Steve Sabella, Independence, 2014

Sabella (b. 1975, Palestine), unlike Boulatta, uses the medium of abstract photography rather than paintings. He work is an active member of the Islamic art community with many solo exhibits of his work around the world. Sabella's work centers around the common theme of exile and homeland, as he grew up in Jerusalem during the Israeli occupation. His usage of photography holds meaning as he believes it transcends walls where he finds "freedom between the rocks and the sky", commenting on his consistent theme of nature within his work. Sabella believes that the natural world can transcend language and oppression, and can give people a window to look into a place that they don’t initially relate to due to their own personal journey.

=== Samia Halaby ===
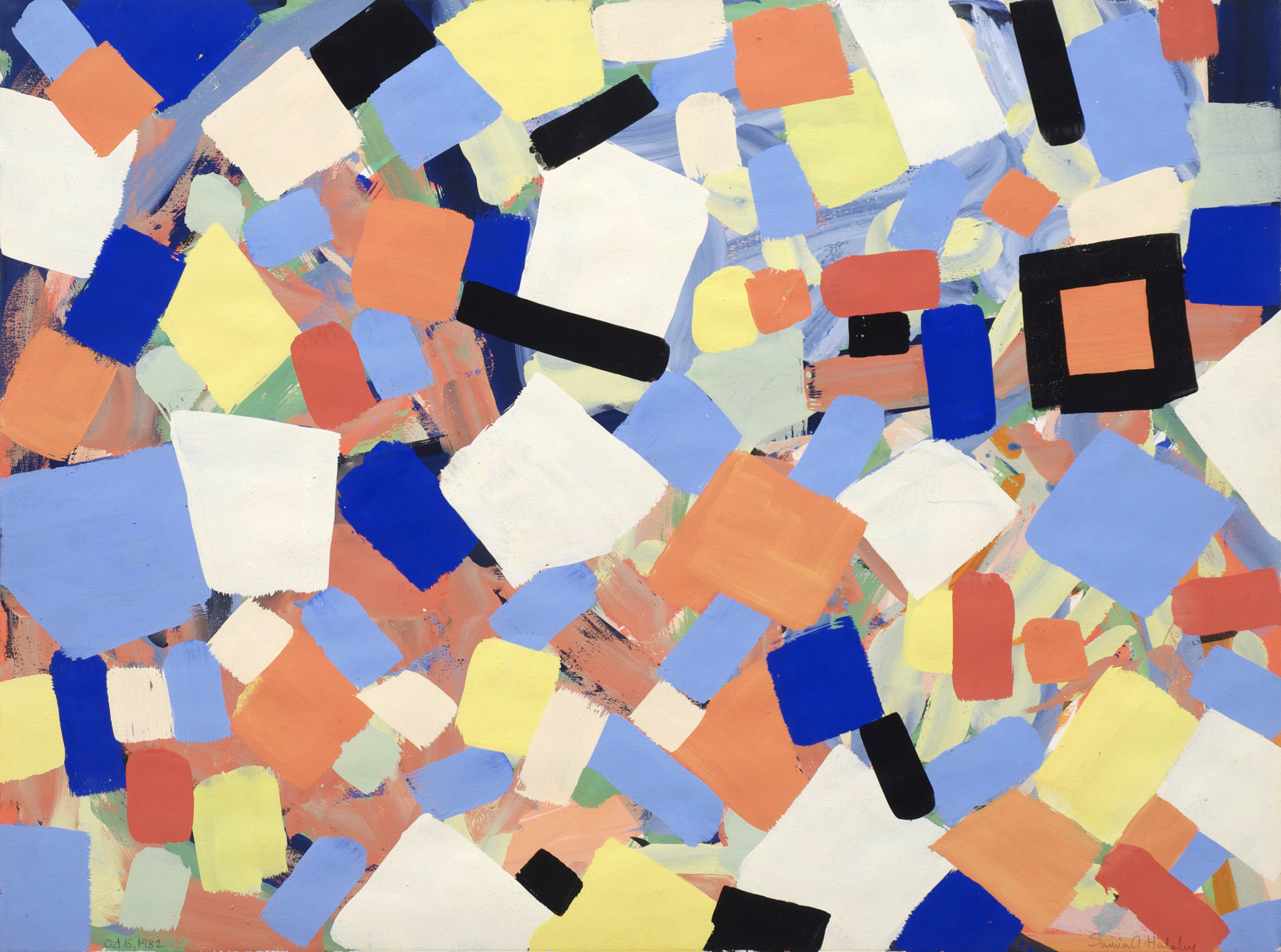
Samia Halaby, All Blue, 1982

Samia Halaby (born 1936, Palestine) was displaced with her family to Cincinnati, Ohio in 1948 due to the Nakba. Her work has become a cornerstone of Arab Abstract art, due to her discussions of diaspora through her work and her experience with it. She believes that her art comes from a place deeper than political issues. Halaby believes that beyond her culture, abstract art is “the most advanced art form of our time”, and she tends to keep her documentary and political work out of her paintings. Rather than discussing the past or present within her work, she focuses on how abstract art can transform how people see and act on the future, hopefully giving her audience a new perspective on advancing society through art. Her work has been displayed all around the globe and published in numerous journals on Islamic art.

== See also ==
- Palestinian art
- Contemporary Palestinian art
- Hurufiyya movement
- Abstract art
