= Rana Samara =

Palestinian painter (born 1985)

- Born: 1985 (age 40–41); Jerusalem
- Children: 3

Rana Samara (Arabic: رنا سمارة; born 1985) is a Palestinian painter. Her work explores societal expectations and taboos regarding Palestinian women's sexuality and gender roles.

== Early life and education ==
Samara was born in Jerusalem. She grew up in a "typical Palestinian family". At one point in her childhood, her family's home was stormed by Israeli soldiers while she was playing Super Mario, a memory which later inspired pieces of her art. As a teenager, she began analyzing social expectations as they related to gender.

Samara's father encouraged her to study finance, but after one semester she changed her major to art. She completed a two-year degree at Palestine Technical College in graphic design. She then went on to study contemporary visual arts at International Academy of Art Palestine. She later obtained a master's degree in Fine Art from Northwestern University in Illinois.

== Career ==
Samara's work often focuses on places and objects, particularly indoor rooms, rather than human figures. She has said she wants to move away from common Palestinian artistic motifs, like olive trees, and to instead portray everyday interior life as a way to "make the private public". She is inspired by "intimate stories and female wisdom". Her painting style has been compared to Henri Matisse and David Hockney.

Samara is represented by Zawyeh Gallery in Ramallah. In 2016, she had her first solo exhibition, Intimate Spaces, at the gallery. The exhibition was based on a year of research in Al-Am'ari refugee camp and West Bank villages, during which she interviewed women residents about their sex lives and experiences with intimacy. The exhibition was later shown at Art Dubai in 2017.

In 2019, Samara exhibited her series "War Games" at Art Dubai. The paintings were born out of an 18-month research project based in Jerusalem and Jordan, and focused on the dreams of children and refugees impacted by war. They were inspired by Samara's interaction with a young boy in Jerusalem whose home had been destroyed.

In June 2021, Samara's pieces were included in Zawyeh Gallery's permanent group exhibition.

In June 2022, Samara exhibited in Zawyeh Gallery's Dubai gallery; her 40 piece exhibition, Inner Sanctuary, focused on "the artist’s conception of her own intimate space from an emotional perspective".

During the Gaza war, Samara worked with Zawyeh Gallery to raise money to support humanitarian efforts in the Gaza Strip. She created pieces inspired by images of the war, specifically looking at what children carried with them as they evacuated their homes.

== Personal life ==
Samara lives in Ramallah, in the West Bank. She has three children, and is estranged from her ex-husband.
