= Issam Bader =

- عصام بدر
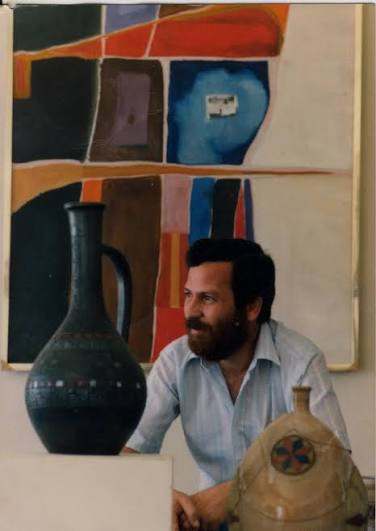
- Palestinian artist Issam Bader (1948–2003) at an art exhibition. Bader was a painter, ceramicist, and art educator who co-founded the Association of Palestinian Artists and played a significant role in Palestinian contemporary art.
- Born: 1948; Hebron, West Bank, Palestine
- Died: November 2003 (aged 54–55); Ramallah, West Bank, Palestine
- Other names: Issam Badr, Essam Badr
- Movement: Palestinian visual arts movement
- Website: issambader.ps

Issam Bader, or Issam Badr (Arabic: عصام بدر; 1948 – November 2003) was a Palestinian painter, ceramicist, and art educator. He was a co-founder of the Association of Palestinian Artists (رابطة الفنانين التشكيليين الفلسطينيين) and a leading figure in the development of the modern Palestinian visual arts movement in Palestine also, while it was under Israeli occupation. He is also credited with originating the story behind the adoption of the watermelon as a symbol of Palestinian resistance.

== Early life and education ==
Issam Bader was born in 1948 in Hebron, West Bank, Palestine. He graduated from the Academy of Fine Arts in Baghdad in 1973, and later earned a master's degree in ceramics from the Tbilisi State Academy of Arts in Tbilisi, Georgia in 1982.

== Career ==
In 1971, Bader held a solo exhibition described as marking the revival of the visual arts movement in the West Bank under occupation, after which a number of other artists began active careers.

He went on to hold numerous solo exhibitions in Hebron, Jerusalem, Nablus, and Ramallah, and participated in group exhibitions in Baghdad, Jerusalem, Nazareth, and internationally. In 1979, he created a mural for the Ramallah municipality building, composed of eight iron and ceramic forms set into a marble floor, and held a graphic art exhibition in Ramallah the same year.

Bader's work combined painting and ceramics, drawing on geometric folk forms and stylized natural and local symbols connected to the land and Palestinian identity, including compositions based on Arabic letterforms. His early work was influenced by the Palestinian artist Ismail Shammout, an influence visible in his painting Qissat al-Khuruj thumma Tariq al-'Awda ("The Story of the Exodus, then the Path of Return").

He was a co-founder of the Association of Palestinian Artists (also referred to as the Association of Palestinian Visual Artists in the West Bank and Gaza), founded in 1980, which united artists across the occupied territories and played an influential role in coordinating artistic efforts during the First Intifada.

=== Publications ===
In 1984, Bader co-authored, with fellow artist Nabil Anani, the book al-Fann al-Tashkili al-Filastini fi al-Ard al-Muhtalla (الفن التشكيلي الفلسطيني في الأرض المحتلة, "Palestinian Visual Art in the Occupied Land"), a documentation of Palestinian visual art under occupation.

== Watermelon symbol ==
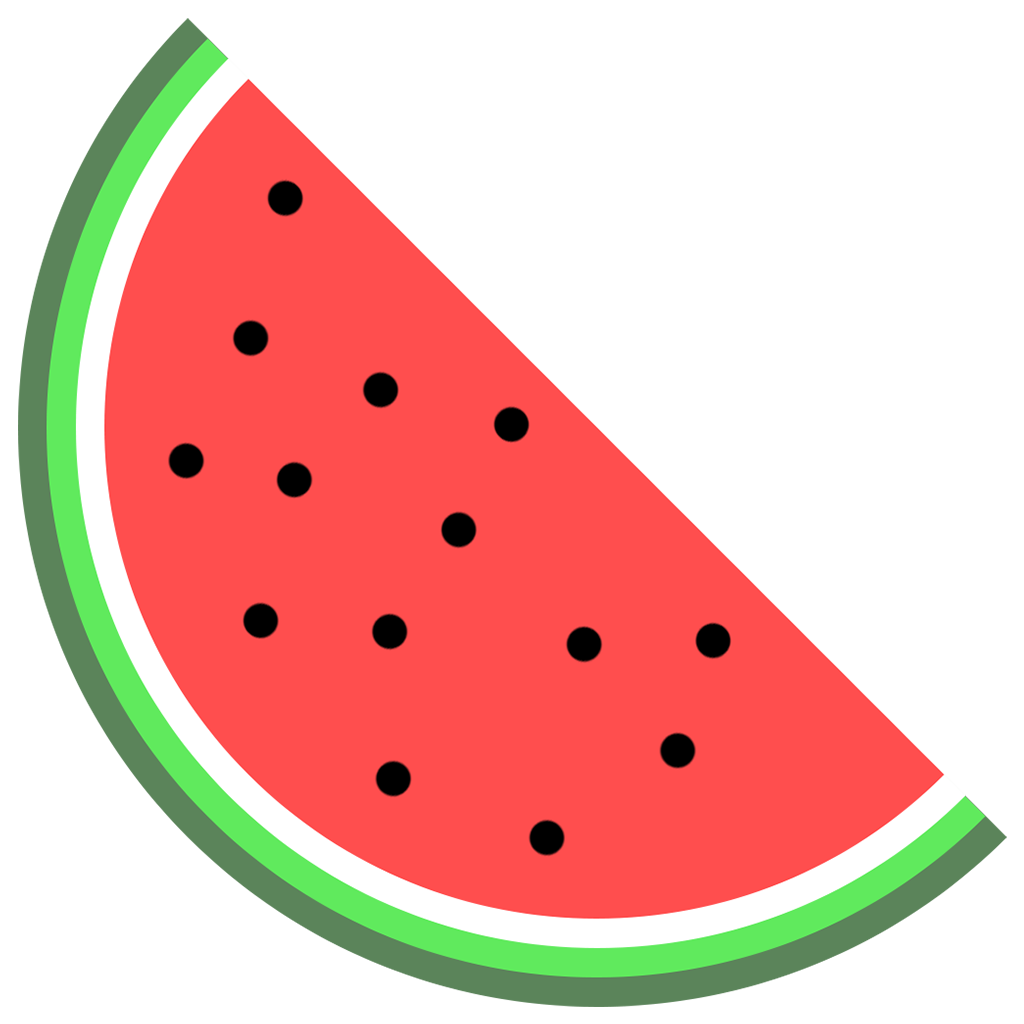
Watermelon symbol, often used as an emoji (🍉)

Bader is among the artists most closely associated with the origin of the watermelon as a symbol of Palestinian solidarity and resistance, an anecdote later widely recounted by fellow artist Sliman Mansour. According to multiple accounts, around 1980 an Israeli military officer informed a group of Palestinian artists—including Bader, Mansour, and Nabil Anani—that depicting the Palestinian flag or its colors (red, green, white, and black) in artwork was forbidden. When Bader asked whether a flower painted in those colors would be permitted, the officer reportedly replied that it would be confiscated—"even if you draw a watermelon."

This exchange has been widely cited in Arabic and international media as the origin of the watermelon—whose cross-section displays the same colors as the Palestinian flag—as a symbol of Palestinian identity and resistance, particularly after Israel's ban on public display of the Palestinian flag following the 1967 occupation. The story later inspired the artist Khaled Hourani's well-known 2007 work The Story of the Watermelon and his 2013 Flag print, which depicts a sliced watermelon in the colors of the Palestinian flag. The watermelon symbol gained renewed international attention during the Sheikh Jarrah events of 2021 and following the escalation of the Israel–Gaza conflict from October 2023.

Some scholars have questioned aspects of the symbol's popular history; Palestinian researcher Issam Nassar has argued that, prior to its recent international popularization, the watermelon was not a widespread or culturally embedded emblem in Palestinian life.

== Death and legacy ==
Bader died in Ramallah in November 2003. He is regarded as one of the pioneering figures of the modern Palestinian visual arts movement that developed during the occupation, and his role in co-founding the Association of Palestinian Artists, as well as his part in the well-known watermelon anecdote, remain frequently cited in discussions of Palestinian art and visual culture.
