= New Visions =

Palestinian art movement

New Visions نحو التجريب والإبداء
- Years active: 1987–present
- Location: Palestine
- Major figures: Sliman Mansour, Vera Tamari, Tayseer Barakat, Nabil Anani
- Influenced: Boycott, Divestment and Sanctions

The New Visions group (Arabic: نحو التجريب والإبداء, romanized: Naḥw at-Tajrīb wa-l-Ibdāʾ) was a Palestinian art group that was founded during the First Intifada (1987-1993) by four artists: Sliman Mansour, Vera Tamari, Tayseer Barakat, and Nabil Anani.

== History and Context ==
The group was part of cultural resistance to the Israeli occupation of Palestine at the time of the First Intifada (1987–1993). According to their 1989 manifesto, the group sought to begin "an aesthetic quest to elevate artistic vision to a level that affirms the artist’s inner freedom and ability to envision beauty and truth in the midst of their daily struggle for freedom"

The four New Vision group co-founders, Sliman Mansour, Vera Tamari, Tayseer Barakat and Nabil Anani, were inspired by calls to boycott goods from Israel, and chose to forego buying imported art supplies in favor of using local materials from their surrounding environment, embodying the First Intifada's philosophy of self-reliance. They stopped using oil paints, and instead began to produce works of fine art such as paintings, posters, mixed media assemblage, and earthworks with only materials found or produced locally. The group's output is lauded as an example of 'committed art', bringing the political in symbolic form of the land (e.g. as mud, hay, leather) into the artwork.

It has been described as an "artists' precursor to Boycott, Divestment and Sanctions (BDS)," highlighting the continued centrality of nonviolent resistance to the Palestinian cause over time. The group's audience was broad and included targeting an international audience as well as the Palestinian public. New Visions became a model for political art in Palestine, and has had a lasting impact on contemporary art practice.

== Materials and Innovation ==
The First Intifada led the artists to question their use of art materials imported from Israel. Mansour recounts that the artists' group was inspired by Palestinian self-sufficiency: "People were planting vegetables in their gardens so as not to buy anything from Israel. We thought, 'Why don’t we do the same as artists? Why should we buy paint from Israeli shops and then use it to paint against them?'." The artists instead started exploring local media including lime, wood, clay, chalk, animal glue or animal fat, straw, mud, leather and natural plant-based dyes such as coffee, olive oil, henna, tea and spices. In doing so, the New Visions group tied the process of art production to the land itself, a political act of self-sufficiency.

Both Mansour and Tamari worked with potter's clay, and added hay to improve its consistency.

Vera Tamari created works in this period featuring family groups in relaxed aspects and leisure activities such as chess and picnicking. Tamari continued this experimentation with medium for many years, including developing a technique for painting water colours on ceramic, media that usually do not mix. Her later work, Tale of a Tree (started in 2002), commemorated in ceramic each olive tree uprooted by Israeli settlers.

Tayseer Barakat, a painter, used wood and fire as his primary art materials, a technique known as pyrography.

Nabil Anani used wood wrapped in sheep's leather, produced by a factory in Hebron/Al Khalil in the occupied West Bank, and then dyed using natural dyes, and ingredients found in the kitchen, as listed above. He used these pigments to burn shapes into wood, "transforming surface damage into a visual language."

All four artists utilized assemblages in their work, drawing from traditions of Islamic art and geometric patterns.

For Mansour, the New Visions group was a turning point in his art production. He said of the shift:

"The intifada mainly liberated us. Our art became more expressive of ourselves and more abstract. We were no longer limited to the traditional way of doing art to please a specific public. For example, I began working with clay and this made me engage in sculpture.”

== Influence ==
The New Visions had an important influence on Palestinian art. Dar El-Nimer for Arts and Culture and the Institute for Palestine Studies called the New Visions artists "four of the founding members of the modern art group in Palestine". Although there were no additions to the founding members - beyond Khalil Rabah joining for a short time from exile in the US - the Palestinian artists' scene benefited from the prompt to experiment with local materials for their artworks, with some using cement, and wood that they hadn't before the intifada. In this way the group had an indirect influence on the development of the visual or fine arts in Palestine and is even considered to have ushered Palestinian fine art towards a more contemporary art practice.

=== Institution Building ===
==== Al-Wasiti Art Centre ====
In 1994, the New Visions group founded the Al-Wasiti Art Centre in a renovated traditional house in Sheikh Jarrah, East Jerusalem, named after Yehya Al-Wasiti, the 13th century pioneer of Arab Painting. The art centre had a permanent collection, a library, an art education unit and a temporary exhibition space. The inaugural exhibition was, From Exile to Jerusalem (1995), and it included the works of Jabra Ibrahim Jabra, Laila Shawa, Kamal Boullata and Vladimir Tamari. Sliman Mansour served as the Director from 1996 to 2003. In 2003, the art centre closed down; in 2005, its archive was donated to a Jerusalem-based non-profit cultural arts organisation, the Palestinian Art Court—al-Hoash, (meaning a courtyard in a traditional Palestinian architecture). The archive now forms the basis of Yura — Palestinian Visual Art Resources Program, the first digital platform Palestinian digital arts, supported by the A. M. Qattan Foundation, which launched in 2022.

==== Birzeit University ====
In 2005, Vera Tamari, co-founded the Birzeit University Ethnographic Museum, further demonstrating the ongoing legacy of the New Vision art group in Palestinian cultural life.

In 2006, the New Visions group helped found the International Academy for Art in Palestine, which operated for 10 years independently and then was incorporated into the Birzeit University Faculty of Art, Music and Design in the occupied West Bank.

=== New Vision's lasting impact ===
In 2018, the A. M. Qattan Foundation (AMQF) honoured the New Visions art collective in a ceremony in Ramallah. During the ceremony artist Khaled Hourani spoke about the impact and accomplishments of New Visions, which AMQF describes as having "set the foundations for contemporary practices of Palestinian visual arts".

In March 2024, Sharjah Art Foundation brought together all four founders (including virtual participation) to present their work under the New Visions group a case study for art-making as an act of resistance.

In December 2024, the Palestinian Museum, a non-governmental association and independent cultural organisation based in the town of Birzeit, near Ramallah, in the West Bank, marked the 37th anniversary of the First Intifada and the 35th anniversary of the New Visions group by unveiling four murals by the four artist co-founders. The four murals were of differing materials, and commissioned and displayed on opposite walls within the Palestinian Museum.

- Vera Tamari's mural (6.3x27.5m), Harisat AlArd (Guardians of the Earth /حارسات الأرض), made up of 3,288 miniature ceramic olive trees painted with watercolours, was inspired by her earlier work from 2002, Hikayat Shajara (A Tree's Tale / حماية شجرة).
- Sliman Mansour's mural, Ala Janah AlMalak (On the Wings of An Angel / على جناح الملاك) used clay with straw, (6x12m) and featured the Old City of Jerusalem as the focal point of the work.
- Nabil Anani's mural, (clay, henna, wood, 3.5x17.5m) is titled, 'The March of the Trees', Maissra Ashjaar / ميسرة الاشجار).
- Tayseer Barakat's mural is titled, 'The Eternal Quest on the Mediterranean Shores', (البحث عن الارجوان على شواطئ المتوسط / Albahth 'an alarjouan 'ala shwati' almutawast), (fire and wood, 17 metres (56 ft) x 3.9 metres (13 ft)).

The murals were created with the assistance of volunteers and students from the nearby Birzeit University's faculty of art, music and design, inspired by the spirit of collective resistance commonly espoused during the First Intifada. The Palestinian Museum stated that the murals will become part of their permanent art collection, in recognition that the group remains relevant today, as Palestinian artists continue to express their daily lives and struggles through creative practice.

== Exhibitions ==
The New Visions collective began holding group exhibitions inspired by the potential of a free Palestine, and the role that art could play in civic resistance, in 1989. This is an incomplete, but representative selection:

- 1989, New Visions, Jerusalem; which also travelled to Germany, Italy and the United States
- 1995, From Exile to Jerusalem, Al Wasiti Art Centre, Jerusalem
- 2016, Rendezvous, Zawyeh Gallery, Ramallah, Occupied Palestinian Territories
- 2018, There is a light that never goes out, at the Khalil Sakakini Cultural Center and Bab idDeir Art Gallery, Ramallah, OPT
- 2019, Challenges Of Identity, Dalloul Art Foundation (DAF), Beirut, Lebanon
- 2024, Gaza: Recalling the Collage of a Place, a virtual exhibition of the early works of Gazan artist Tayseer Barakat, at Zawyeh Gallery, Ramallah, OPT

== Themes and symbolism ==
New Visions artists focused on iconic representations of Palestinian culture and pastoral life. Yazid Anani recalls that these included representations of important aspects of Palestinian culture, traditional and contemporary: the "village, Jerusalem, refugees, the Israeli militaristic machine, prisoners, olive trees, women in embroidered traditional dresses".

Common symbols used include colors from the Palestinian flag, village scenes, Tatreez (embroidery) motifs, chains and prison bars. Works commemorating martyrs would sometimes depict specific deceased individuals or would collage images related to their lives, and were often hung at their grave or home.
