= Khalil Rabah =

Palestinian multidisciplinary artist (born 1961)

- خليل رباح
- Born: 1961 (age 63–64); Jerusalem
- Other names: Khalil Rabach
- Education: University of Texas at Arlington
- Occupation(s): Visual artist, curator, teacher
- Known for: Installation art
- Movement: Conceptual art, New Visions

Khalil Rabah (Arabic: خليل رباح; born 1961) is a Palestinian multidisciplinary visual artist, curator, and teacher. He is known for his conceptual installation artwork focused on rewriting history. Rabah lives in Ramallah, West Bank.

== Life and career ==
Khalil Rabah was born in 1961, in Jerusalem. He graduated from the University of Texas at Arlington.

He is the founder of the Palestinian Museum of Natural History and Humankind project; a co-founder of the Al Ma’mal Foundation for Contemporary Art, Jerusalem; and a co-founder of the ArtSchool Palestine, London. Since 2005, Rabah has served as the director of the Riwaq Biennale in Ramallah.

Rabah taught at Bezalel Academy of Arts and Design from 1997 to 2000; and at Birzeit University.

In 2002, he was awarded the LennonOno Grant for Peace.

== Exhibitions ==
- 1990 – I.D. Entity, University Gallery, University of Texas at Arlington, Arlington, Texas
- 1996 – Converging Cultures, group exhibition, Skirball Cultural Center, Los Angeles, California, U.S.
- 1998 – Every Day, 11th Biennale of Sydney, Sydney, Australia; curated by Jonathan Watkins
- 2004 – Plug In, group exhibition, Futura Center for Contemporary Art, Prague, Czech Republic
- 2005 – What Keeps Mankind Alive?, 9th Istanbul Biennial, Istanbul, Turkey
- 2008 – 5th Liverpool Biennial, Liverpool, United Kingdom
- 2009 – Tarjama / Translation: Contemporary Art from Middle East, Central Asia and its Diasporas, traveling group exhibition, Queens Museum, Queens, New York City; commissioned by ArteEast, curated by Leeza Ahmady
- 2010 – Tarjama / Translation, traveling group exhibition, Johnson Museum of Art, Cornell University in Ithaca, New York
- 2011 – Sharjah Biennial 10, Sharjah, United Arab Emirates; curated by Suzanne Cotter, Rasha Salti, and Haig Aivazian
- 2017 – Sharjah Biennial 13, Sharjah, United Arab Emirates; curated by Christine Tohmé

== See also ==
- Contemporary Palestinian art
