= Vera Tamari =

Palestinian art historian, visual artist, educator (b. 1945)

- فيرا تماري
- Born: 1945 (age 80–81); Jerusalem, Mandatory Palestine
- Other name: Vira Tamari
- Education: Beirut College for Women, University of Oxford
- Occupations: Visual artist, art historian, museum founder, curator, educator
- Organization: League of Palestinian Artists
- Known for: Palestinian art and architectural history, Palestinian activist, ceramics, bas relief, sculpture, installation art, painting
- Movement: New Visions

Vera Tamari (Arabic: فيرا تماري; born 1945) is a Palestinian visual artist, art historian, curator and educator. She is known for artwork in ceramics, sculpture, painting, and installation art. Tamari taught at Birzeit University for many years. She founded the Birzeit Museum of Ethnography and Art. Tamari lives in Ramallah, West Bank. Renowned for her multidisciplinary practice, Tamari has significantly contributed to the development of contemporary Palestinian art through her innovative use of materials and commitment to cultural preservation. She was a founding member of the Palestinian art movement, New Visions (Arabic: نحو التجريب والإبداء, romanized: Nahwa al-Tajrib wa al-Ibda'), with Tayseer Barakat, Sliman Mansour and Nabil Anani, in response to the First Intifada.

== Early life and education ==
Vera Tamari was born in 1945, in Jerusalem, into a Palestinian Christian family originally from Jaffa. Her mother Margo Dabbas was a visual artist, as well as her older brother Vladimir Tamari (1942–2017). She was three years old in 1948 during the Nakba, and her family moved to Jaffa temporarily.

She received a B.A. degree in 1966 in fine arts from Beirut College for Women (now the Lebanese American University); and received a M.Phil. degree in 1984 in Islamic art and architecture from the University of Oxford in Oxford, England. Additionally she had studied ceramics from 1972 to 1974 in Florence, Italy.

== Career ==
Tamari joined the faculty in the architecture department at Birzeit University in 1986, where she taught art history and visual communication for nearly twenty years. She founded the Birzeit Museum of Ethnography and Art in 2005 in Birzeit, West Bank; and the Virtual Communication Gallery, which operated from 2005 until 2010, to facilitate art cultural exchange with the Palestinian diaspora.

Tamari has worked in ceramics, sculpture, and installation art. Her artwork is a nod to Palestinian ceramics history, and touches on themes of identity and memory.

Tamari was one of the founding members of the League of Palestinian Artists (Arabic: رابطة الفنانين الفلسطينيين) art collective in 1973, the other founding artists included Karim Dabbah, Taysir Sharaf, Nabil Anani, Kamel Mughanni, Tayseer Barakat, Fathi Ghabin, Issam Badr, Suleiman Mansour, Fatin Tubasi, Samira Badran, and Yusuf Duwayk. The group wanted to created Palestinian visual art on native land. She has also been a founding member of the Palestinian art movement, New Visions (Arabic: نحو التجريب والإبداء, romanized: Nahwa al-Tajrib wa al-Ibda'). In 1987, the New Visions art group was founded by Tamari, Tayseer Barakat, Sliman Mansour, and Nabil Anani. As a group the members of New Visions had pledge to make art with naturally found materials, in order to divest from spending money on Israeli art supplies.

== Publications ==
- Amiry, Suad; Tamari, Vera (1 January 1989). The Palestinian Village Home. Trustees of the British Museum. p. 17. ISBN 978-0-7141-1599-3.

== See also ==
- New Visions
