= Contemporary Palestinian art =

Post-1970 artwork by Palestinians

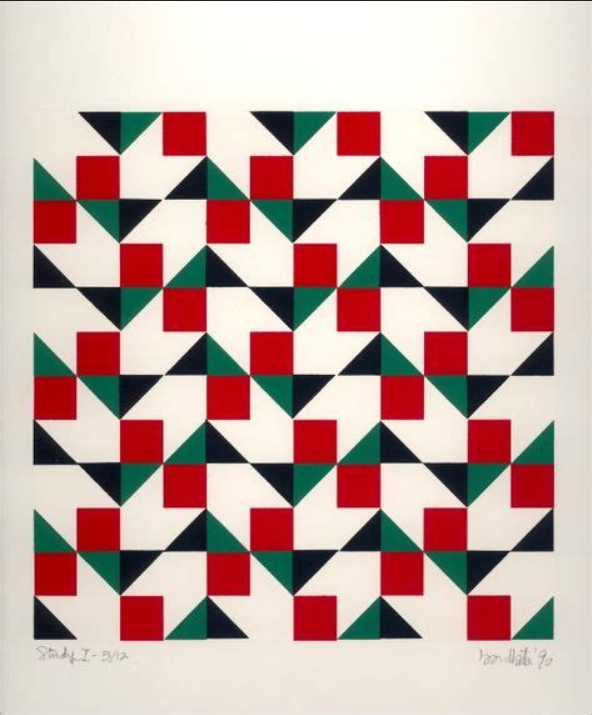
Homage to the Flag, silkscreen, Kamal Boullata. (1990)

Contemporary Palestinian art is a term used to describe artwork produced by Palestinians post-1970. It is produced in four main geographic centers: 1) The West Bank and Gaza 2) Israel 3) the Palestinian diaspora across the Arab World 4) the Palestinian diaspora in the United States and Europe. Due to the widespread geographic presence of Palestinians as well as a lack of Palestinian institutions and historical museum infrastructure, contemporary artists focus on highlighting Palestinian identity as opposed to specific territorial claims or centralized cultural institutions. Artists rely on the collective experiences, shared narratives, and symbolic representations of Palestine.

== Political context ==
Palestinians experienced mass exile and dislocation in 1948 known as al-Nakba, or “the Catastrophe”. Following the Nakba, artists began depicting this violent displacement through images of massacres, refugees on foot, abandoned homes, and other iconography (see below). Later events such as The Six Day War, the 1982 Lebanese War, the 1993 Oslo accords, and The First and Second Intifada heavily influenced contemporary artists. Widespread liberation movements brought upon surges in resistance art. Artists now felt a sense of urgency which they illustrated through their stark imagery including guns, blood and graves.

Notably following the Palestinian Liberation Organization's establishment in 1964, art became a widespread means of defiance during the Intifadas. For example, the PLO designed, produced, and disseminated thousands of posters to advocate for Palestinian national identity, mobilize support for resistance, and highlight key political events or issues. These posters often employed bold and recognizable visual elements and nowadays are often created and distributed digitally, increasing their reach and extending to international audiences. For example, political cartoonist Naji all-Ali produced thousands of cartoons, many featuring the recognizable child Handala, the woman Fatima, and the fat man representing Arab leaders. These were all created in an attempt to criticize not only the Israeli state, but also the inefficiency of the Arab states. Until the 1990s, there was limited gallery space and opportunities for Palestinian artists to display their work professionally in Palestine. Despite their censorship, collectives of artists have created contemporary art movements in Palestine. In Gaza, The Eltiqa for Contemporary Art and The Shababik Windows for Contemporary Art galleries (created in 2002 and 2009 respectively) were active galleries and organizations supporting local artistic creation. Both have since been destroyed by Israeli forces. Contemporary art in Gaza, while fragile due to the lack of stable public or private support and an underdeveloped local art market, possesses a unique flexibility. While artists in the Palestinian diaspora engage with their environments, those in Gaza have cultivated self-sustaining practices shaped by confinement, economic instability, and political upheaval. This has turned artists to use mediums such as graffiti, cartoons, posters, and other urban art forms. These conditions have driven Gazan artists to break from tradition and reinvent their approaches, using art as a means of expressing freedom and resistance rather than merely building on or imitating past practices.

== Iconography ==
Use of specific recurring symbols and iconography in contemporary Palestinian art, contribute to a movement to articulate a national Palestinian identity. These contemporary symbols of nationalism, originated from cultural symbols in the context of the political and socio-economic conditions of Palestine in the early 20th century to present day. Post-Nakba, Palestinian nationalistic imagery works to convey central themes of dispossession, displacement, suffering, and longing for return to homeland.

=== The key ===
Following the 1948 Nakba, the key became a recurring symbol in Palestinian art, literature, and media. Many Palestinians who became displaced from their homes post-Nakba, carried with them the keys to their former residences, as “evidence of their property ownership in the pre-Nakba period”. In retaining the keys to their lost homes, the Key is a visual reminder of the loss, displacement, memory, and nostalgia of homeland for Palestinians in refugeehood. The key thus has become a symbol for the Palestinian national narrative of the ‘right of return,’ which encompasses the collective desire of Palestinians to return to their homelands. In the context of the ‘right of return’ the key additionally represents a rejection of Israeli occupation, and has become a protest symbol.

The key can be seen across contemporary art including works such as:

1. The Sea is Mine, Sliman Mansour (2016)
2. Key of Return, Aida Social Youth Center (2008)

=== Jerusalem ===
The city of Jerusalem, is also commonly depicted in contemporary Palestinian art. The connection between Palestinians and Jerusalem stems from the city's historical, religious, political-economic, cultural, and geographical significance to Palestinians. The Old City–an area of Jerusalem containing multiple holy sites to Christians, Jews, and Muslims–is most commonly referenced in Palestinian contemporary artworks depicting Jerusalem. These representations of the Old City often place higher emphasis on the landscape, architecture, and religious icons of the city, rather than on specific figures and cultural details. The Dome of the Rock–an Islamic shrine located in the Old City–is specifically used across contemporary artworks of Jerusalem. Artwork illustrating the landscape of the Old City of Jerusalem, embodies a utopian image of the city, representing Palestine as the land of peace. Depictions of Jerusalem within contemporary Palestinian art, in working to evoke feelings of loss and a desire to return to a historical past, contributes to a nationalist narrative.

Depictions of Jerusalem can be seen across contemporary art including works such as:

1. Jerusalem, Nabil Anani (2011)
2. Camel of Hardships, Sliman Mansour (1974)
3. Woman with Jerusalem, Sliman Mansour (1983)
4. Woman Carrying Jerusalem, Sliman Mansour (1979)

=== The olive tree ===
Within contemporary Palestinian art, the olive tree is a nationalist symbol representing connection to the land of Palestine in relation to the historical and cultural traditions and communal practices of Palestinian peoples. The significance of olive trees within Palestinian visual culture, arose from a multiplicity of conditions, including the abundance of olive trees across the mountainous regions of the West Bank. Olive tree by-products being central to Palestinian cuisine, has thus supported generations of farmer communities involved in the harvesting and maintenance of olive tree groves. From the social and familial values embedded in traditional olive harvesting, the roots of the olive tree itself are representative of the continuous sense of rootedness by Palestinians to the land.

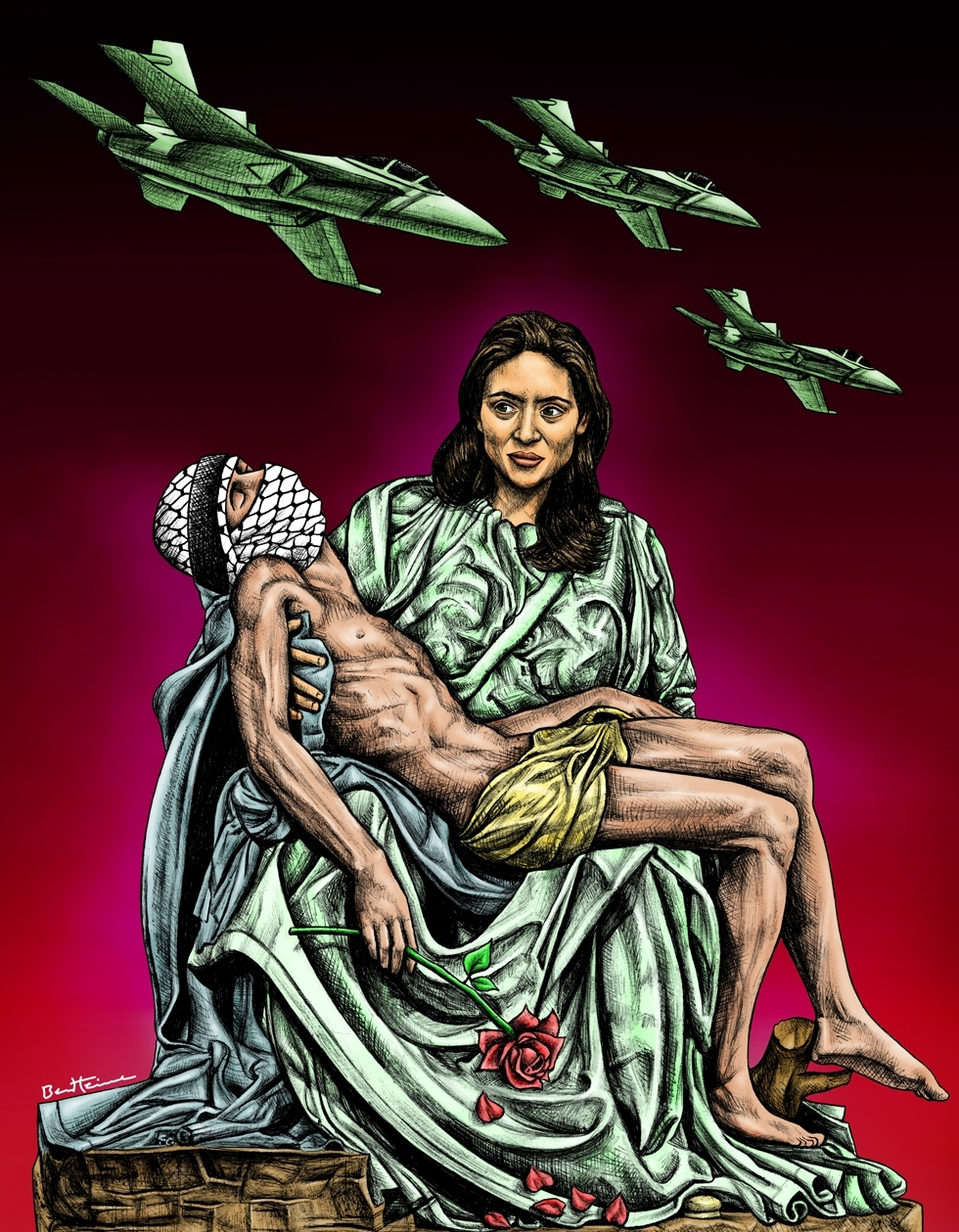
Palestinian Pieta (Ben Heine, 2009)

The olive tree can be seen across contemporary art including works such as:

1. Holy Family in an Olive Grove, Sliman Mansour (2020)
2. Roots of an Ancient Olive Tree, Walid Abu Shakra (1985)
3. We Are Olive, Malak Mattar (2019)

=== The keffiyeh ===
The keffiyeh–a square shaped cloth traditionally worn as a sun protection for Bedouins living in the desert–has become a contemporary symbol of Palestinian identity and resistance.

The keffiyeh can be seen across contemporary art including works such as:

1. Children of Palestine, Sliman Mansour (1990)
2. Homage to Ghassan Kanafani, Samia Halaby (2017)
3. Fashionista Terrorista, Laila Shawa (2010)

=== The cactus ===
The cactus– known in Arabic as Saber and also meanings “patience” and “perseverance”–has significance within Palestinian culture due to their abundance, edibility, and historical use for property marking. The cactus, being indigenous to Palestine, has been recognized by Palestinians for its ability to grow in harsh environments while producing edible fruit underneath its thorny exterior. Within visual representations, the cactus takes on a metaphorical meaning that symbolizes both Palestinian resistance to Israeli occupation and connection to physical land.

The cactus can be seen across contemporary art including works such as:

1. Drowning Cactus, Laila Shawa (2014)
2. Collective Memory, Cactus Brain, Samira Badran (2014)
3. Cactus, Asim Abu Shakra (1988)

=== The orange tree ===
The orange tree in contemporary Palestinian art is associated with exile and the loss of the nation of Palestinians post-Nakba. Planted along the coastal areas of Palestine, orange tree groves became a major export during the 1930s and 1940s, becoming a symbol of pride for the Palestinian peoples. In 1948, Israeli forces then assumed ownership of these orange groves generating the brand of the “Jaffa Orange” as a symbol for Israel's newly acquired nationhood. Following the mass exile of Palestinians post-Nakba, representations of the orange evolved into a symbol for the robbery of land and nationhood for Palestinians.

The orange can be seen across contemporary art including works such as:

1. From the River to the Sea, Sliman Mansour (2021)
2. Orange Grove, Sliman Mansour (1984)
3. Yafa - Mermaid, Imad Abu Shtayyah (2015)

== Recent reception ==
Social media has played a major role in the way contemporary Palestinian artists have been received. Samia Halaby, an accomplished abstract artist and vocal supporter of Palestine, is known to use her social media presence to shed light on the violence Palestine is facing. Her social media posts caught the attention of faculty at Indiana University and its Eskenazi Museum of Art. She then received a curt message from the museum's director stating that her exhibition would be canceled and that the organization did not wish to further communicate with her; Halaby spoke to the New York Times to convey her outrage.

However, Palestinian art has also been celebrated - but not without opposition - as shown by journalist Bisan Owda's documentary. Owda's documentary entitled, “It’s Bisan From Gaza - and I’m Still Alive,” won an Emmy Award for Outstanding Hard News Feature Story. The win comes after a non profit Jewish organization, Creative Community for Peace, called for the National Academy of Television Arts and Sciences (NATAS) to rescind the nomination. In response, NATAS issued an open letter to the organization that underscored their commitment to rewarding truthful, complex journalism and standing by their choice to nominate Owda.

A Manchester arts center, HOME, canceled a Palestinian literature showcase after receiving hundreds of complaints and a letter from the Jewish Representative Council of the Greater Manchester Region issued antisemitic allegations against the artist, Atef Abu Saif. The well-documented dispute caused the English Arts Council to change museum guidelines. Museums are now strongly cautioned against “overtly political or activist statements” and could have their funding taken away if they entertain such art.

The reception of Palestinian art is often first treated by its proximity to antisemitism rather than its own cornerstone of culture. As a result, when Palestinian artists showcase their work on an institutional level there is a palpable reliance on institutions of power to stand up for an artist's work. Social media, however, has revolutionized the ways in which Palestinian artists can reach new audiences and share their art in its most honest, most creative form.

Groups such as the Palestinian Campaign for the Academic and Cultural Boycott of Israel (PACBI), Artists Against the Occupation (AAO) have been great actors in the support of Palestinian art. PACBI led a campaign to cancel, boycott, and end all cooperation with Israeli art and organizations. The AAO has protested the occupation by bringing Palestinian and Israeli artists together hoping for peaceful resolutions to the conflict.

== Notable artists ==
- Naji al-Ali
- Nabil Anani
- Anisa Ashkar
- Asad Azi
- Kamal Boulatta
- Samia Halaby
- Mona Hatoum
- Sliman Mansour
- Malak Mattar
- Khalil Rabah
- Larissa Sansour
- Juliana Seraphim
- Ismail Shammout
- Laila Shawa
- Ahlam Shilbi
