= Sacha Craddock =

British art critic and curator

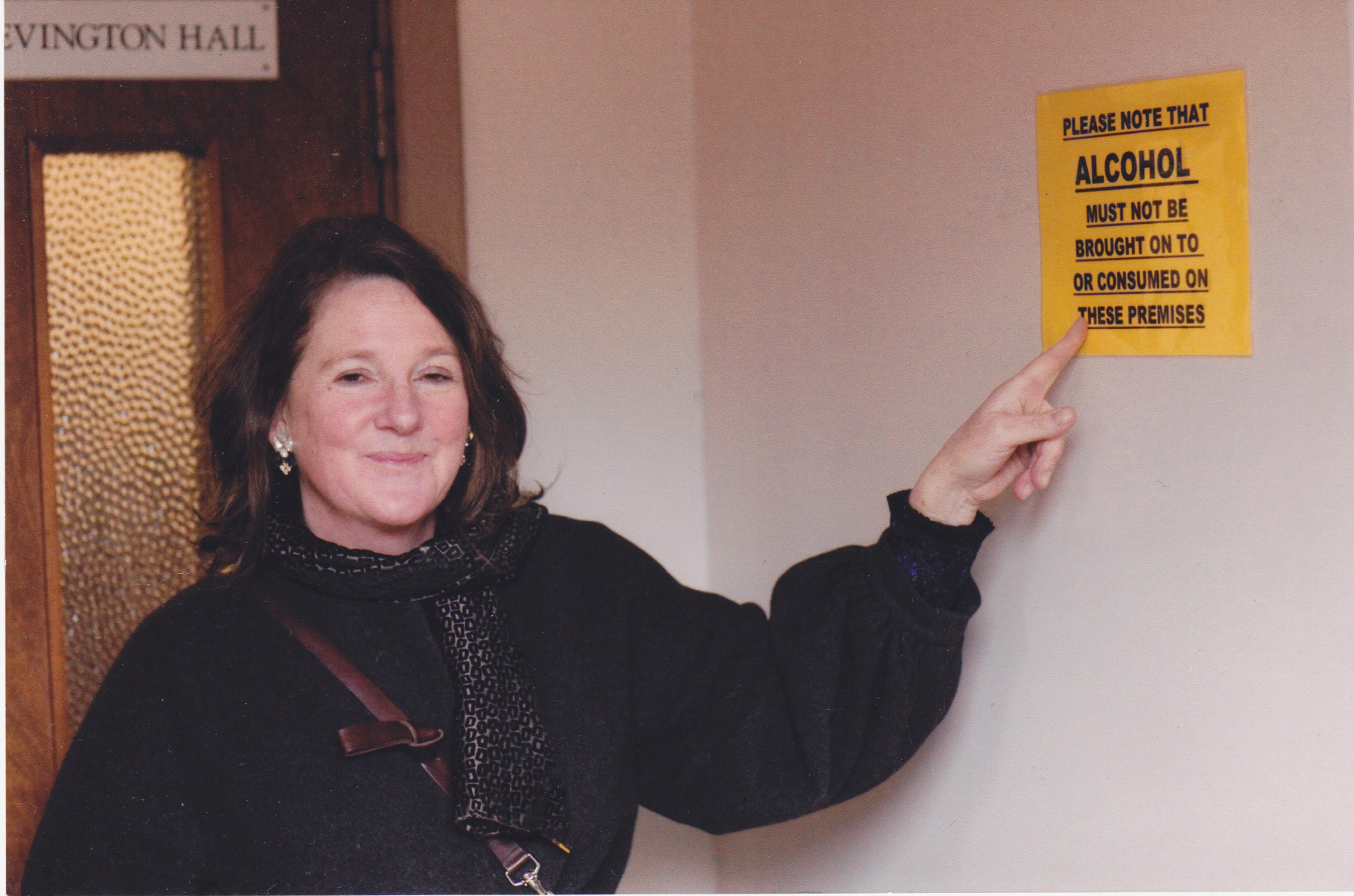
- Born: August 6, 1955 (age 71); New Zealand
- Education: Central Saint Martins
- Known for: Art critic, writer, curator

Sacha Craddock (born 6 August 1955) is an independent art critic, writer and curator based in London. Craddock is co-founder of Artschool Palestine, co-founder of the Contemporary Art Award and council member of the Abbey Awards in Painting at the British School at Rome, Trustee of the Shelagh Cluett Trust, and President of the International Association of Art Critics AICA UK. She was chair of the Board of New Contemporaries and its selection process from 1996 until December 2021.

== Biography ==
Born in New Zealand, Craddock moved to Oxford as a child, and then to London in 1973, where she went on to help formulate one of the city's most well-known squats on Tolmers Square in Euston. Craddock continues to live communally along with some of the original Tolmer's residents. After completing a degree in fine art painting at Central St Martins, and a post-graduate painting degree at Chelsea School of Art, Craddock began writing art criticism for The Guardian newspaper in 1988, her first review appearing in the 26 May issue of the paper. (Note: "Death in Fine Detail". The Guardian. 26 May 1988.) Later, Craddock was also a regular art columnist for The Times, reviewing exhibitions of up and coming Young British Artists (she was the only journalist to review the pre-YBA exhibition: Freeze, which featured early work by artists such as Damien Hirst, Sarah Lucas, and Mat Collishaw). In 1996, Craddock became chair of Bloomberg New Contemporaries (formerly Young Contemporaries).

Craddock has judged many art prizes, such as the Turner Prize in 1999 and the John Moores Painting Prize in 2008. In 2005, Craddock co-founded ArtSchool Palestine (ASP) with Charles Asprey, and Samar Martha, in order to promote and support Palestinian artists and aid their participation in international contemporary art exhibitions and biennales. ASP has held many events and exhibitions, including As If By Magic, to which the British artist Damien Hirst lent his support.

Sacha Craddock was the co-founder of Bloomberg Space and its curator from 2002 to 2011. Craddock's curatorial contribution included Gillian Wearing at IVAM Institut Valencià d'Art Modern in 2015, Turner Prize 2017 at Hull, Strike Site at Backlit Gallery in Nottingham in 2018, the SPECTRUM Art Award 2018 at Saatchi Gallery, and Creekside Open and Exeter Contemporary Open in 2019.

== Other collaborations and activities ==
- Myriad Editions, Graphic Novel Competition, guest judge (2020)
- The Incorporated Edwin Austin Abbey Memorial Scholarships and Award, The British School at Rome, board member (2010–present)
- The Shelagh Cluett Trust, trustee (2019)
- Royal Academy, The definers of success: The Successful Artist? panel discussion with artist Yinka Shonibare MBE RA, Head of the RA Schools, Eliza Bonham Carter, and the Director of Ikon Gallery Jonathan Watkins chaired by art critic and curator Sacha Craddock (2018)
- The International Awards for Art Criticism, IAAC 5, selection panel (2018)
- Vitrine Gallery, Symposium Public Sculpture: From Process to Place, guest panellist (2015)
- TATE Museum, American Artist Lecture Series, guest lecturer (2014)
- Pangaea Sculptors' Centre, True Or False: There’s No Such Thing As Sculpture, a curated conversation with Liliane Lijn, Elizabeth Neilson, Ossian Ward, Toby Ziegler and Sacha Craddock as chair (2013)
- John Moores 25, Contemporary Painting Prize, guest judge (2008)
- Braziers International Workshop, chair (1999–2004)
- Venice Biennale, A series of three breakfast meetings, contributor (2003)
- Open Sculpture, The Royal West of England Academy, selection committee (2003)
- Jerwood Foundation Painting Prize, guest judge (2001)
- Turner Prize, guest judge (1999)
- The Royal Borough of Kensington and Chelsea, public art advisor (2009–2010)
- Fondazione MACC, Sardinia, chair member

== Selected bibliography ==
Craddock has written on contemporary international artists, including Alison Wilding, Laura Ford, Mark Boulos, Benjamin Senior, Angus Fairhurst, Richard Billingham, Jose Dávila, Chantal Joffe, Mustafa Hulusi, Andreas Reiter Raabe, Cornelia Parker, Phyllida Barlow, Heri Dono, Wolfgang Tillmans, Rosa Lee, Young In, Chris Ivey, and Alberto Savinio.

=== Selected books ===
- Adam Henein Abdulrahman Alsoliman: The Art Library Discovering Arab Artists. [S.l.], Sacha Craddock, Mona Khazindar (editor), RIZZOLI, 2021.
- Women artists : a conversation, Sacha Craddock; Fine Art Society, 2017.
- Paul Hamlyn 'Here': Paintings, Sacha Craddock, Michael Richardson (editor), Art Space Gallery, 2012.
- Goodbye to London: Radical Art & Politics in the 1970s, Sacha Craddock, Peter Cross, Homer Sykes, Astrid Proll, Hatje Cantz, 2011.
- Nothing in the World but Youth, Iain Aitch, Sacha Craddock, Jon Savage, Turner Contemporary, 2011.
- Angus Fairhurst, Sacha Craddock, James Cahill, Philip Wilson Publishers, 2009.
- The Turner Prize and British art, Louisa Buck; Mark Lawson, novinar.; Grayson Perry; Lionel Shriver; Tom Morton; Michael Bracewell; Sacha Craddock; Katharine Stout; Nicholas Serota, London : Tate Publishing, 2007.
- Chantal Joffe, Neal Brown, Sacha Craddock, Victoria Miro, 2008.
- B.Read: 8: The Producers: Contemporary Curators in Conversation, Sacha Craddock, Andrew Renton, Jonathan Watkins, Laura Godfrey-Isaacs, James Putnam, Barbara London & Sarah Martin, Susan Hiller (editors), BALTIC Centre for Contemporary Art, 2002.
- L'anti-monument : les mots de Paris, Jochen Gerz, Sacha Craddock, [Arles u.a.] : Actes Sud, 2002.
- Art for All? Their Policies and Our Culture, Mark Wallinger and Mary Warnock (editors), London : Peer, 2001.
- A Split Second of Paradise: Live Art, Installation and Performance, Childs, Nicky; Walwin, Jeni; Craddock, Sacha; Etchells, Tim; Kent, Sarah; Khan, Naseem; Levy, Deborah; Lomax, Yve; MacRitchie, Lynn; Phillips, Andrea; Warner, Marina, 1998.
- Cathy de Monchaux, Mark Gisbourne, Louisa Buck, Sacha Craddock, Kathy Acker, Whitechapel Art Gallery, 1997.
- Elizabeth Ogilvie: Island Within, Tessa Jackson, Kenneth White, Sacha Craddock, Arnolfini, 1995.
- Gravity & Grace: The Changing Condition of Sculpture 1965–1975, Sacha Craddock, Hayward Publishing, 1993.

=== Selected writing ===
- Milly Thompson Obituary for The Guardian, 2023.
- Sadang B: Young In Hong for Korean Artist Prize exhibition catalogue, 2019.
- Andreas Reiter Raabe for exhibition catalogue, 2019.
- Fundamental Concerns for Jose Dávila - Not All Those Who Wander Are Lost exhibition catalogue, 2018.
- Beau Travail for book Mark Boulos, 2017.
- Towards a Greater Artistic Freedom for Preoccupying Zones: The Young Artist of the Year 2004. The Hassan Hourani Award, 2004.
- Cornelia Parker for the book Sculpture in 20th-century Britain, 2003.
- Anna Barriball for Recognition, Arnolfini, for exhibition catalogue, 2003.
- Reinventing the Wheel for book Art: What Is It Good For?, 2002.
- Light After Dark for LUX Europæ, 1993.

=== Selected articles ===
- "Sacha Craddock: New Order: Art, Product Image, 1976–95" for Burlington Contemporary magazine, 2019.
- "Sacha Craddock on Alberto Savinio" for PICPUS #21, PICPUS press, 2018.
- "London, Points of Departure" for Artasiapacific, Issue 85, September/October 2013.
- "Review Europe" for ArtReview, Issue 47, 2011.
- "Mike Nelson" for ArtReview, Issue 20, March 2008.
- "Cultural Checkpoint" for Artasiapacific, Issue 61: 15th Anniversary Special Issue, 2008.
- "Goshka Macuga" for Contemporary Magazine, Issue 64, 2004.
- "Embedded: Sacha Craddock on Politics in Art" for Contemporary Magazine, Issue 69, 2004.
- "Thomas Struth" for Contemporary 21, No 67, 2004.
- "World Review England" for Art Price, Vol. 002, 2003.
- "David Cotterrell" for Beck's Futures, 2002.
- "Art as a Museum…Museum as Art" for The British Museum Magazine, No 41, Autumn/ Winter 2001.
- "In and Out of the Sun: Sacha Craddock on Francis Alÿs" for Contemporary Art Magazine, No. 21, Spring 2000.
- "More Questions Than Answers" for Public Art Journal, Volume 1, Number 1, March 1999.
- "Review Piece: Sacha Craddock has the last word on Sensation" for Creative Camara Magazine, Issue 349, 1997.
- "Art Review, Sigmar Polke at Tate Gallery Liverpool" for Art+Text, 1995.

=== About Craddock ===
- Tali Silver, "Omelet and Muscadet with Sacha Craddock: Sacha Craddock in conversation with Tali Silver", Luncheon- No2 magazine, Autumn 2016.
- "Freeze: Defrosted", Review of Freeze from 1988, Time Out, London, 2008.
- Matthew Sweet, "The Bloomsbury Set", The Sunday Times, 1999.
