= Khaled Jarrar =

Palestinian artist

Khaled Jarrar (born 1976, Palestine) is an artist working in various mediums, including photography, video, sculpture, installation and performance. His work explores issues around the occupation of Palestine. Jarrar moved from Ramallah, Palestine. to New York City, where he is an artst-in-residence at The Old American Can Factory.

== Biography ==
Born in 1976 in Jenin, his work explores the realities and impacts of occupation and power struggle on the Palestinian lived experience, particularly in the West Bank. He completed his studies in 1996 in Interior Design at Palestine Polytechnic University, and worked as a bodyguard for PLO leader Yasser Arafat. He then worked as a carpenter, before graduating from the International Academy of Art Palestine in 2011.

In 2015, he painted a rainbow flag on a section of a West Bank wall, and a group of Palestinians painted over it. Jarrar said that he painted the rainbow flag to remind people that although same-sex marriage was legalized in the United States. Palestinians still live in occupation, and criticized the paint-over, stating that it "reflects the absence of tolerance, and freedoms in the Palestinian society".

Jarrar's work takes the form of various mediums, including video art, photography, performance art, sculpture, and installation art. His works have been exhibited internationally, including at Ayyam Gallery in London, and at the Centre Pompidou in Paris.

== List of work ==
Notable examples of his work include:

- State of Palestine (performance art) (2012)
- Whole in the Wall (2013)
- No Man's Land (2016)
