= Hiribya =

Hiribya هربيا Hirbya, Herbieh
- Former village
- Etymology: Herbieh, p.n., from "to take flight".
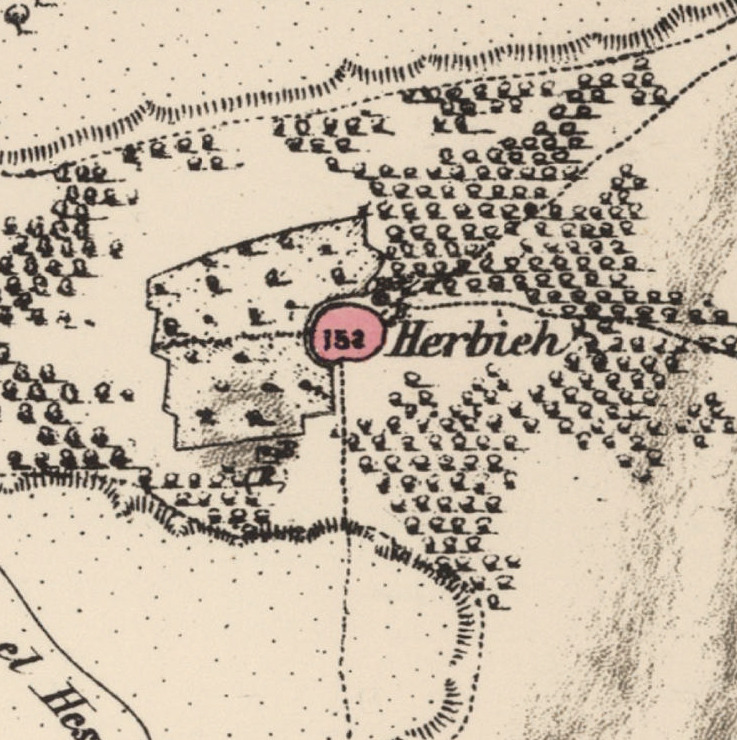
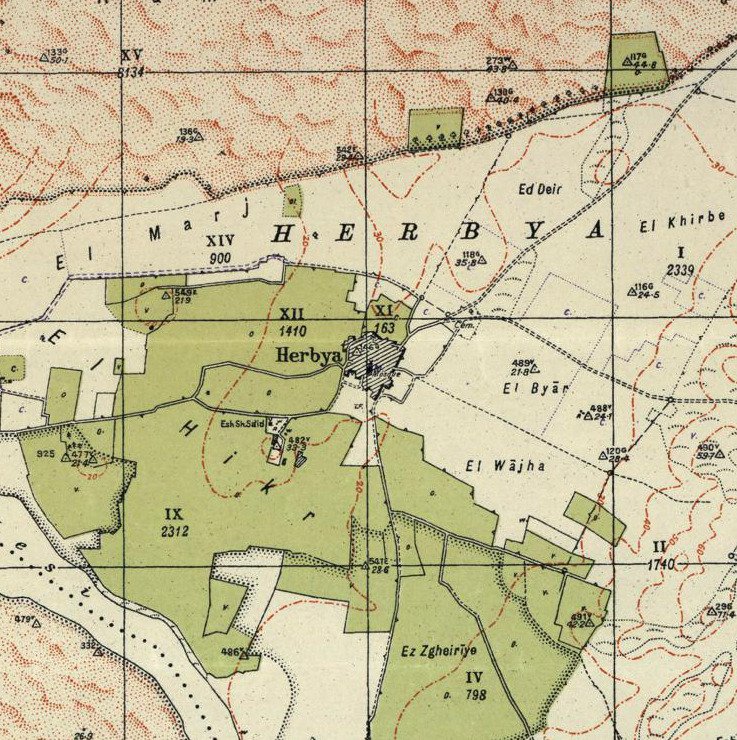
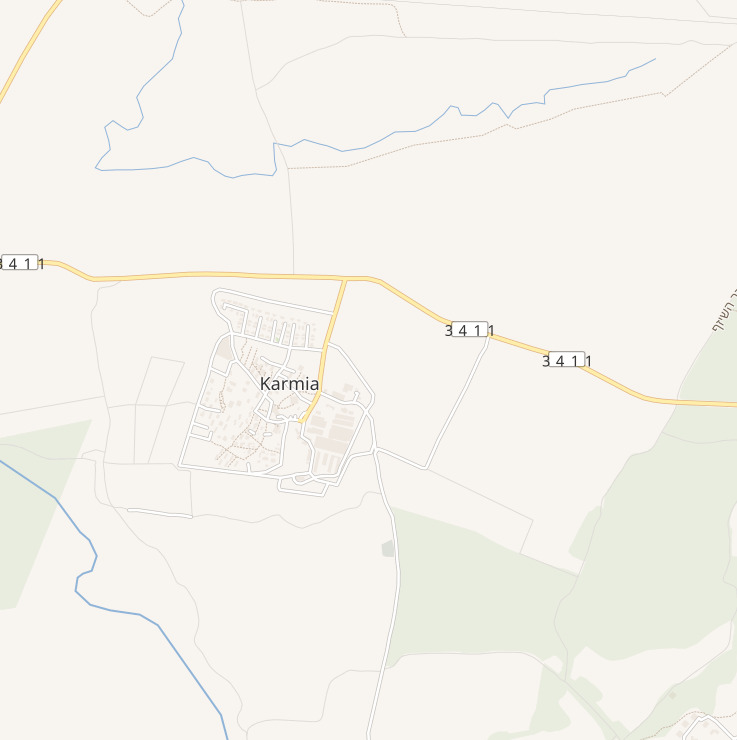
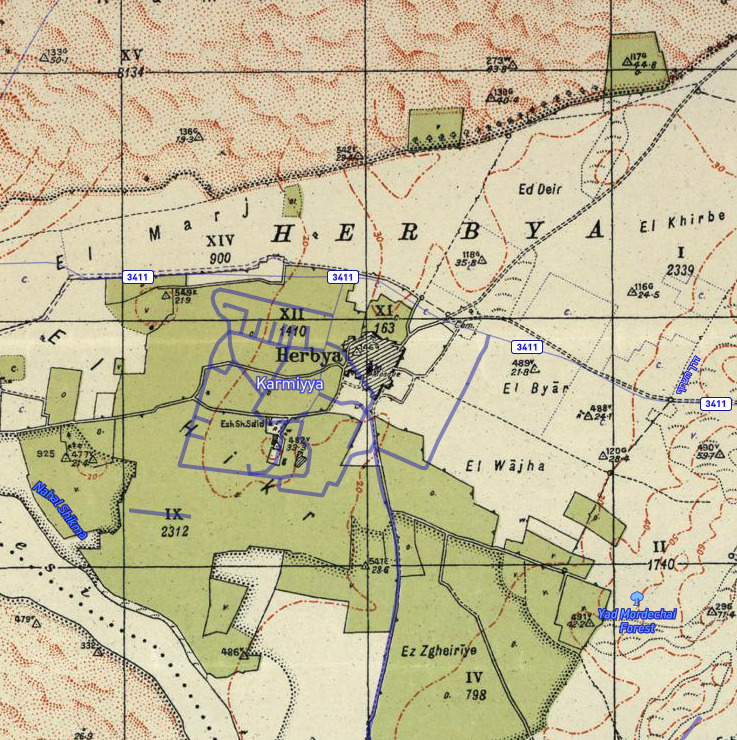
- 1870s map 1940s map modern map 1940s with modern overlay map A series of historical maps of the area around Hiribya (click the buttons)

- Location within Mandatory Palestine
- Coordinates: 31°36′21″N 34°32′47″E
- Palestine grid: 107/112
- Geopolitical entity: Mandatory Palestine
- Subdistrict: Gaza
- Date of depopulation: late October–November 1948

Area
  - Total: 23.3 km^{2} (9.0 sq mi)

Population (1945)
  - Total: 2,300
- Cause(s) of depopulation: Military assault by Yishuv forces
- Secondary cause: Expulsion by Yishuv forces
- Current Localities: Zikim, Karmia, Yad Mordechai

Hirbiya (Arabic: هربيا) was a Palestinian Arab village in the Gaza Subdistrict, located 14 kilometers (8.7 mi) northeast of Gaza along the southern coastal plain of Palestine. Situated where the Battle of La Forbie took place in 1244, it was depopulated during the 1948 Arab-Israeli War.

== History ==
=== Bronze Age ===
Settlement at the site of Hirbiya dates back to the Canaanite period.

=== Crusader period ===
It was known as "Forbie" to the Crusaders. In 1226, the Syrian geographer Yaqut al-Hamawi called it "Firbiya" (or "Farbaya") and noted that it was within the administrative jurisdiction of Ascalon.

The village was the site of a crucial battle, called the Battle of La Forbie, between the Crusaders and the Ayyubids, which ended in a decisive Ayyubid victory. Historians consider it second in strategic significance only to the Battle of Hattin in 1187.

A circular well, made of masonry, and the foundations of a small tower were still found there in the late 19th century.

=== Ottoman period ===
Hirbiya was incorporated into the Ottoman Empire in 1517 with the rest of Palestine, by the 1596 tax records it was located in the nahiya (subdistrict) of Gaza, a part of the Liwa of Gaza. It had a population of 160 households and 15 bachelors, an estimated 963 person, all Muslim. The villagers paid a fixed tax rate of 33.3% on various products, including wheat, barley, grapes, fruit, and cotton; a total of 35,500 akçe. All of the revenue went to a waqf.

During the 17th and 18th centuries, settlement in the region declined due to nomadic attacks on local communities. The residents of abandoned villages moved to elsewhere but the land continued to be cultivated by neighboring villages.

In 1838 Hirbiya was described as part of the Gaza district.

An Ottoman village list from 1870 showed that Herbija had 58 houses and a population of 206, which included only men.

In the late 19th century Hirbiya had a rectangular layout, although some of its adobe brick houses were scattered in surrounding orchards. The village was surrounded by a pond, a well, and several gardens. To the south were remains of the Crusader fortress.

=== British mandate ===
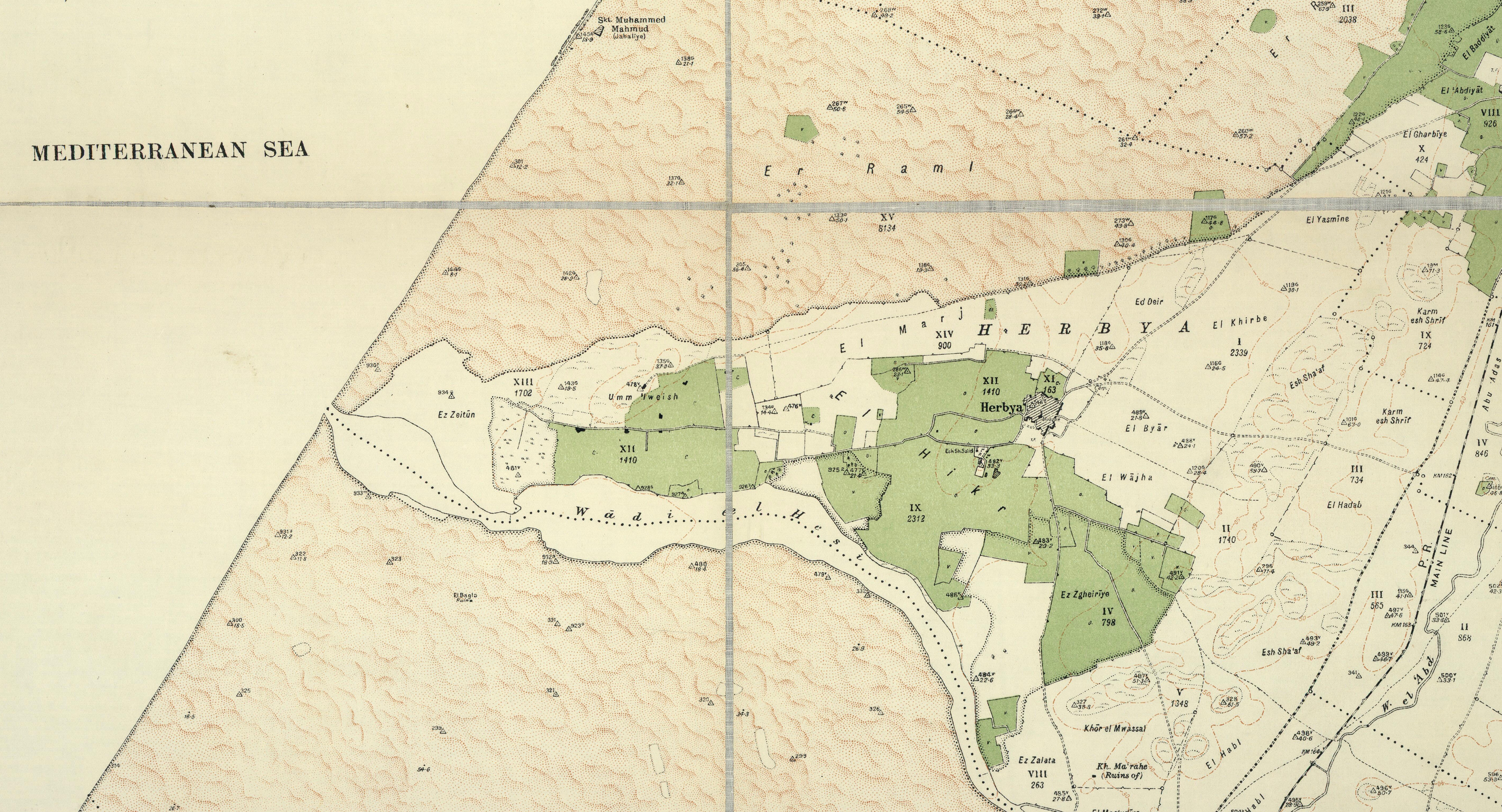
Hiribya 1931 1:20,000

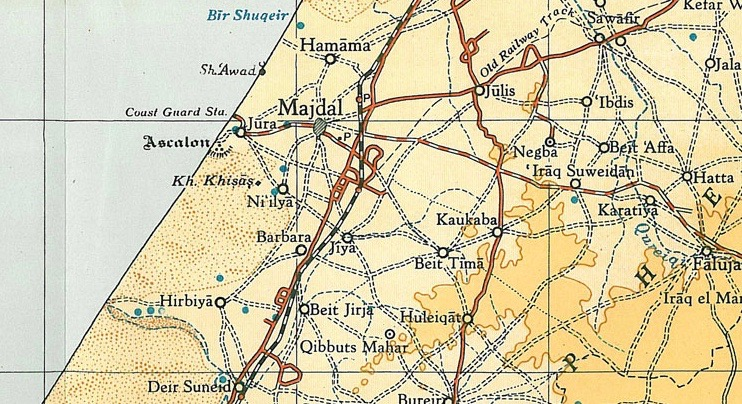
Hiribya 1945 1:250,000

In the 1922 census of Palestine, conducted by the British mandate authorities, Herbia had a population of 1,037 inhabitants, consisting of 1031 Muslims and 6 Orthodox Christians, The population had increased in the 1931 census to 1,520; 1,510 Muslims and 10 Christians, in 234 houses. Hirbiya had a mosque and elementary school, both located in the village center. The school opened in 1922 and had an enrollment of 124 students in the 1940s.

In 1945 Hiribya had a population of 2,300; 2,200 Muslims, 40 Christians and 60 Jews, with a total of 22,312 dunams of land, according to an official land and population survey. Of this, 2,765 dunams were used for citrus and bananas, 6,106 dunams were for plantations and irrigable land, 2,037 for cereals, while 92 dunams were built-up land.

=== 1948 war ===
Hirbiya was targeted in October 1948 during Operation Yoav, coming under aerial bombardment on October 15–16. A planned attack was called off when Israeli forces learned that a large Egyptian Army force was quartered in the village. Khalidi speculates that the village fell to Israeli forces in early November, shortly after the occupation of Ascalon.

== People from Hiribya ==
- Fathi Ghaben

=== Israel ===
Following the war the area was incorporated into the State of Israel and two kibbutzim, Zikim and Karmia, were established on village lands in 1949 and 1950 respectively. Kibbutz Yad Mordechai, established in 1943, expanded onto Hirbiya's lands. According to Khalidi, only the mosque, which was used as a warehouse, and one residential building, remain from earlier times.

== Bibliography ==
- Barron, J. B., ed. (1923). Palestine: Report and General Abstracts of the Census of 1922. Government of Palestine.
- Conder, C.R.; Kitchener, H. H. (1883). The Survey of Western Palestine: Memoirs of the Topography, Orography, Hydrography, and Archaeology. Vol. 3. London: Committee of the Palestine Exploration Fund.
- Department of Statistics (1945). Village Statistics, April, 1945. Government of Palestine.
- Hadawi, S. (1970). Village Statistics of 1945: A Classification of Land and Area ownership in Palestine. Palestine Liberation Organization Research Center.
- Hartmann, M. (1883). "Die Ortschaftenliste des Liwa Jerusalem in dem türkischen Staatskalender für Syrien auf das Jahr 1288 der Flucht (1871)". Zeitschrift des Deutschen Palästina-Vereins. 6: 102–149.
- Hütteroth, W.-D.; Abdulfattah, K. (1977). Historical Geography of Palestine, Transjordan and Southern Syria in the Late 16th Century. Erlanger Geographische Arbeiten, Sonderband 5. Erlangen, Germany: Vorstand der Fränkischen Geographischen Gesellschaft. ISBN 3-920405-41-2.
- Khalidi, W. (1992). All That Remains: The Palestinian Villages Occupied and Depopulated by Israel in 1948. Washington D.C.: Institute for Palestine Studies. ISBN 0-88728-224-5.
- Le Strange, G. (1890). Palestine Under the Moslems: A Description of Syria and the Holy Land from A.D. 650 to 1500. London: Committee of the Palestine Exploration Fund. OCLC 1004386.
- Mills, E., ed. (1932). Census of Palestine 1931. Population of Villages, Towns and Administrative Areas. Jerusalem: Government of Palestine.
- Morris, B. (2004). The Birth of the Palestinian Refugee Problem Revisited. Cambridge University Press. ISBN 978-0-521-00967-6.
- Palmer, E. H. (1881). The Survey of Western Palestine: Arabic and English Name Lists Collected During the Survey by Lieutenants Conder and Kitchener, R. E. Transliterated and Explained by E.H. Palmer. Committee of the Palestine Exploration Fund.
- Robinson, E.; Smith, E. (1841). Biblical Researches in Palestine, Mount Sinai and Arabia Petraea: A Journal of Travels in the year 1838. Vol. 3. Boston: Crocker & Brewster.
- Socin, A. (1879). "Alphabetisches Verzeichniss von Ortschaften des Paschalik Jerusalem". Zeitschrift des Deutschen Palästina-Vereins. 2: 135–163.
