= ArtSchool Palestine =

British non-profit organization

ArtSchool Palestine (ASP) is a non-profit organisation based in the Palestinian territories and in London. It was founded in 2005 by Charles Asprey, Sacha Craddock and Samar Martha to promote and support Palestinian artists and aid their participation in international contemporary art exhibitions and biennales.

ASP has held events and exhibitions, including As If By Magic, to which the British artist Damien Hirst lent his support; and Points of Departure, a group exhibition and public programme with six residencies in London and Ramallah by British and Palestinian artists, organised with the British Council.
