= Fathi Ghaben =

Palestinian painter (1947–2024)

- فتحي غبن
- Ghaben in 2020
- Born: 1947; Hiribya, Gaza Subdistrict, Mandatory Palestine
- Died: 25 February 2024 (aged 77); Gaza City, Gaza Strip
- Education: Al-Azhar University – Gaza (did not graduate)
- Occupation: Painter
- Spouse: Faiza (m. 1966)
- Children: 16

Fathi Ghaben (Arabic: فتحي غبن; also spelled Fathi Ghabin; 1947 – 25 February 2024) was a Palestinian self-taught artist and educator, whose paintings depicted Palestinian culture, resistance, and right of return.

== Personal life ==
Fathi Ghaben was born in Hiribya village in the Gaza Subdistrict in 1947, Ghaben and his family experienced displacement many times due to Israeli occupation. He enrolled at Al-Azhar University in the 1960s, but was unable to complete his education because of financial issues. Seven of his paintings were on display at the Palestinian Red Crescent Society, until the building was destroyed by a fire caused by Israeli bombardment. One of his paintings is on display at the Ministry of Culture of Gaza. Ghaben was arrested in 1984 on charges of "inciting violence" by Israel. He was married to Faiza. He married her at the age of 19 and soon was the father of 8. After dropping out of primary school, Ghaben worked as a newspaper seller, for 15 years, and at a citrus orchard. He had approximately 16 children. One of his sons, named Hossam, died from cancer at the age of 18.

== Career ==
Tessa Solomon wrote in ARTnews magazine that Ghaben was considered "one of Palestine's most prominent painters". His work became known in the 1970s and 80s, and he worked in a highly colorful "exuberant" style.

Ghaben painted his nephew Suhain, who was killed by Israeli soldiers during a demonstration in April 1982. It was the reason behind his 1984 imprisonment. He was first arrested in 1970 for "planting a bomb" during a demonstration in Gaza. Ghaben was arrested and detained for 45 days in 1975. Ghaben's work was included in exhibitions in Palestine and abroad, including Arab and Western countries. He was the recipient of several orders and medals, including the Medal of Sword of Canaan, which he received from Yaser Arafat. He was one of the founders of the Association of Fine Artists and Artists in Gaza. He represented Palestine at the Arab Plastic Artists, which is based in Cairo. He was the founder of Fathi Ghaben Center of Arts, which helped discover promising young artists in Gaza. As of 2015, he resided in Nasser. More recently, in July 2023, he was awarded the Annual Media Freedom Awards Appreciation Award by the Palestinian Press House.

== Death ==
Ghaben died in Gaza on 25 February 2024, at the age of 77 during the ongoing Gaza war. He suffered from serious lung problems, and the unavailability of oxygen and medicine in Gaza prevented him from receiving appropriate health care treatment for his conditions. He was not permitted to leave the besieged enclave to seek necessary medical care; his requests to depart the war-torn area for medical treatment were not responded to by Israeli authorities.
