= Zawyeh Gallery =

Galleries in Ramallah and Dubai

Coordinates: 31.9263°N 35.2135°E

The Zawyeh Gallery (Arabic: غاليري زاوية, romanized: Ghālīrī Zāwiyah) are independent art galleries located in Ramallah, Palestine and Dubai, United Arab Emirates.

== History ==
It was founded by Ziad Anani in 2013 in Ramallah, to support and promote local emerging and established artists from Palestine to show their work internationally. In March 2020, Zawyeh opened a second gallery in Dubai. In addition to exhibitions in its two spaces, the gallery has participated in Beirut Art Fair, Art Dubai, and other fairs in Turkey and Europe. Among Palestinian artists it has represented are Sliman Mansour, Malak Mattar, and Samir Salameh.

== Exhibitions ==
- 2013, Spaces; a group exhibition
- 2014, Colors of Life; a group exhibition, curated by Sulieman Mleahat
- 2014, In Memory; a group exhibition
- 2014, Pre-1948 Palestine, at Zawyeh Gallery Ramallah; solo exhibition of Nabil Anani
- 2015, Narratives, at Zawyeh Gallery Ramallah; a group exhibition featuring artists Abed Alem, Ahmad Kanaan, Amani Harhash, Asad Azzi, Irina Naji, Jawad Malhi, Marwa Najjar, Maisara Barood, Mohammad Khalil, Nabil Anani, Sana Bishara, Sliman Mansour, and Tayseer Barakat

== See also ==
- The Palestinian Museum
- List of Palestinian artists
