= Palestinian Press Agency =

Palestinian news agency in Gaza

Safa Press Agency
- وكالة الصحافة الفلسطينية
- Abbreviation: SAFA
- Formation: 5 July 2009; 17 years ago
- Type: News agency
- Official language: Arabic
- Website: safa.ps

The Palestinian Press Agency (Arabic: وكالة الصحافة الفلسطينية, romanized: Wikālat aṣ-Ṣaḥāfa al-Filasṭīniyya), also known as the Safa News Agency or Safa Press Agency (stylized as SAFA; Arabic: صفا), is a Gaza-based Palestinian news agency affiliated with Hamas.

The agency was launched on July 5, 2009, and headed by Yasser Abu-Hin, who previously directed Hamas-affiliated PalMedia. Abu-Hin states that the agency is independent and not affiliated with Hamas. He described Safa's goal as to "expose the crimes of the Israeli occupation against the Palestinian people as a national priority." According to Wael Abdelal of Qatar University, Hamas leaders who work in media such as Safa are generally reticent to publicly declare media institutions' affiliation with Hamas.

Facebook deleted the agency's page in March 2018 as part of a broader blocking of Palestinian accounts for alleged incitement. According to Palestinian activists, Facebook deleted the accounts of more than 500 journalists and pages since the beginning of 2018.

== See also ==
- Wafa
