= Khaled Hourani =

Palestinian artist (born 1965)

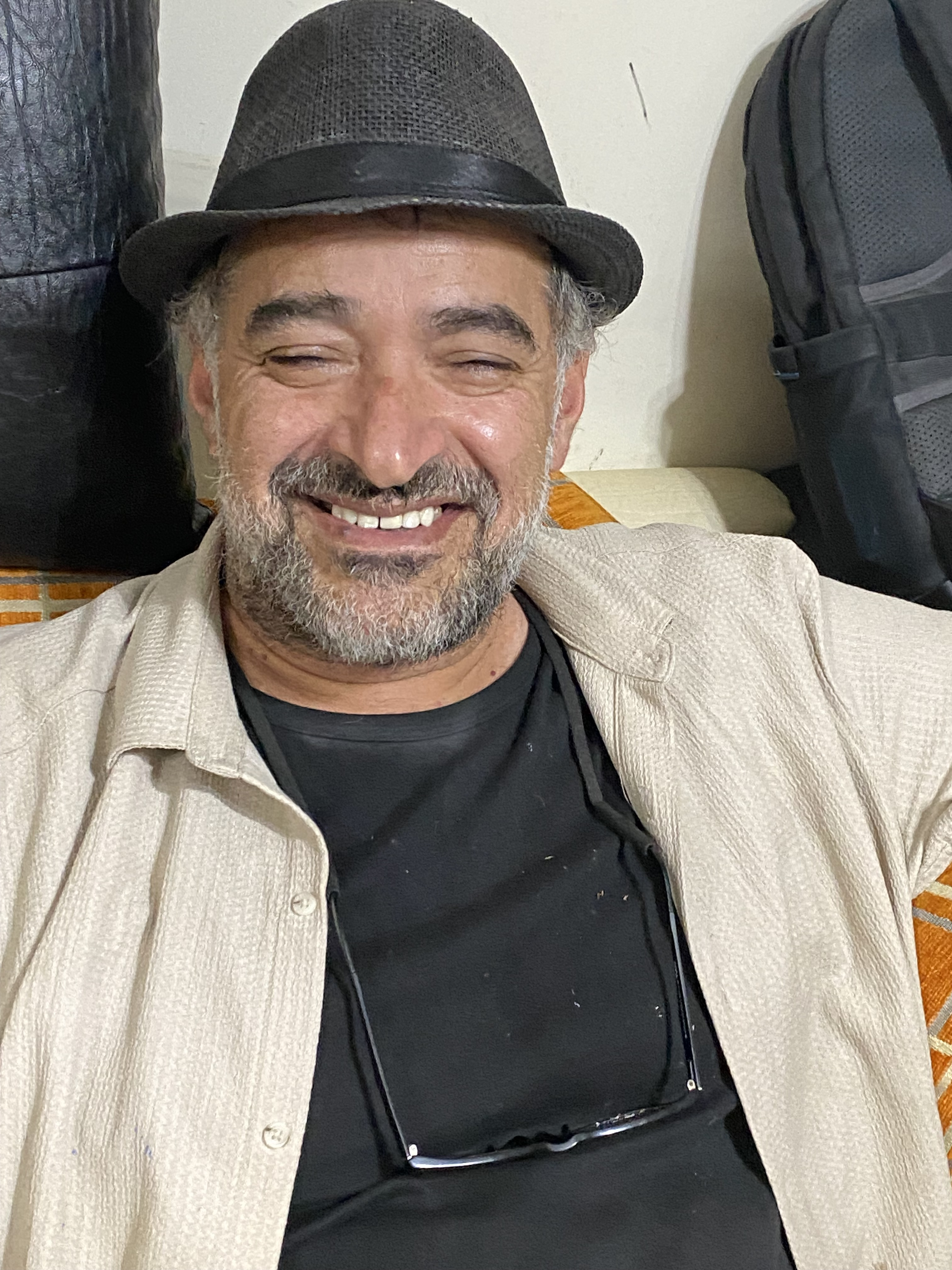
Khaled Hourani in 2024

Khaled Hourani (Arabic: خالد حوراني; born 1965) is a Palestinian artist, curator, critic, and writer. Since 2019, Hourani has worked as a freelance artist in Ramallah, participating in exhibitions abroad and within Palestine. Hourani is known for his contributions to the contemporary art scene in Ramallah and his visual works focusing on themes of Palestinian struggle and resistance.

== Early life and education ==
Born in Hebron, Palestine, in 1965, Hourani obtained his BA in History from Hebron University in 1987. Hourani began his art career in the 1980s.

== Career ==
Hourani worked within the Fine Arts Department in the Palestinian Ministry of Culture from 2004 to 2006 as the General Director. In 2007, Hourani co-founded the International Academy of Art in Ramallah, Palestine, which did not offer accreditation from the Palestinian Authority but functioned as a nontraditional source of art education for students and non-students alike. From 2007 to 2010, Hourani served as the Academy’s Artistic Director, then as the General Director from 2010 to 2013.

Hourani is known for his 2011 project Picasso in Palestine, which borrowed Picasso’s 1943 Bust de Femme painting from the Van Abbemuseum in the Netherlands and displayed it in the International Academy of Art in Ramallah. The project, which took two years to complete, saw the collection of several hundred thousand dollars of funding and the construction of a 4×4 meter museum space created exclusively to meet the display conditions required for Bust de Femme. The project drew praise from Palestinian artists Sliman Mansour and Nabil Anani. Much of Hourani’s art focuses on the Palestinian national struggle, depicting protests, border walls, and Palestinian landscapes.

Hourani’s art is featured at the Van Abbemuseum (Eindhoven, Netherlands), Barjeel Art Foundation (Sharjah, UAE), Guggenheim Museum (Abu Dhabi, UAE), Darat al Funun (Amman, Jordan), Dalloul Art Foundation (Beirut, Lebanon), Birzeit University Museum (Birzeit, Palestine), Mori Art Museum (Tokyo, Japan), The Palestinian Museum (Birzeit, Palestine), and Umm al-Fahem Museum (Umm al-Fahem, Palestine), among others.

In 2019, Hourani published his novel In Search of Jamal El Mahamel, a story about tracing the story of Sliman Mansour’s “Jamal El Mahamel” painting during the Libyan uprising against Muammar al-Gaddafi.

== Art exhibitions/galleries ==
- (2019) Dispersed Crowds, solo exhibition at Zawyeh Gallery, Ramallah, Palestine
- (2019) Picasso and Spanish exile at Musée d'art moderne et contemporain, Toulouse, France
- (2017) Catastrophe and the Power of Art at Mori Art Museum, Tokyo, Japan
- DOCUMENTA (13) in Kassel and KW Institute for Contemporary Art in Berlin, Germany
- (2014) First retrospective exhibition at the CCA in Glasgow and Gallery One in Ramallah
- (2013) 2nd CAFA Biennale Museum in Beijing, China
- (2012) Times Museum in Guangzhou, China
- (2011) Sharjah Biennial in Sharjah, Saudi Arabia

== Awards ==
- (2019) The State of Palestine Appreciation Award for Art
- (2013) The Leonore Annenberg Prize, Creative Time for Art and Social Change in New York City
