= Nabil Anani =

Palestinian artist

Nabil Anani (Arabic: نبيل عناني; born 1943) is a Palestinian visual artist. He was one of the founders of the contemporary Palestinian art movement called New Visions.

== Biography ==
After his graduation in 1969, from the Faculty of Fine Arts, Alexandria University, Anani returned to Palestine to start his career as an artist and trainer at the UN training college in Ramallah. His first exhibition in Jerusalem was in 1972 and has since exhibited widely in Europe, North America, the Middle East, North Africa and Japan. In 1987, the New Visions art group was founded by Anani, Vera Tamari, Tayseer Barakat, and Sliman Mansour. As a group they had pledge to make art with naturally found materials, in order to divest from spending money on Israeli art supplies.

He was appointed in 1998 as the head of the League of Palestinian Artists and was a key player in establishing the first International Academy of Art in Palestine. Because his art was an expression of collective identity it encountered the military censorship of Israeli authorities, the combined use of four colors of the Palestinian flag was prohibited and he, together with the other members of the league, was subjected to arrest and interrogation.

Nabil was also awarded the first Palestinian National Prize for Visual Art in 1997 by Yasser Arafat.

== Exhibitions ==
- 2014, Pre-1948 Palestine, Zawyeh Gallery, Ramallah
- 2013: "Spirit of the land", Art on 56th, Beirut
- 2011: "Art Palestine", Meem Gallery, Dubai
- 2007: "A Journey into Script", Foyles Gallery, London
- 2001: Sharjah Biennial
- 1995: "It’s possible, Palestinian and Israeli artists", National Museum, Washington

== Memorials ==
During his career, Nabil Anani was commissioned to work on building memorials in Palestine:

- 1986 Statue of aluminum front of the Inash Family Association building, in collaboration with Suleiman Mansour
- 1987 mural front of Faculty of Educational Sciences and the College of Women's Society, Ramallah
- 1993 Metal memorial statue in Kaukab Abu al-Hija park, Galilee
- 2002 Statue of Liberty in Ramallah

== See also ==
- New Visions
