= Faculty of Fine Arts, Alexandria University =

Art school in Alexandria, Egypt

- كلية الفنون الجميلة جامعة الإسكندرية
- Former names: Faculty of Fine Arts
- Established: October 1957
- Founders: Ahmed Osman
- Location: 08 Abdel Salam Aref Mazloum, Alexandria, Egypt

The Faculty of Fine Arts, Alexandria University in Alexandria was established in October 1957, by Ahmed Osman.

== History ==
Its founder was the late sculptor Ahmed Osman, who served as its first dean. The school offered five departments, architecture, decoration (decorative arts), printmaking, painting, and sculpture.

In 1962, the first batch of students graduated after obtaining a bachelor's degree in section of fine arts; and two years later in 1964, the first batch of students was graduated after obtaining a bachelor's degree in architecture. A presidential decree (No. 361) was issued in 1989, to join the Faculty of Fine Arts to the University of Alexandria, in order to form the Faculty of Fine Arts, Alexandria University.

The Egyptian School of Fine Arts [Madrassat al-Funun al-Jamila al-Misriyya] was the first school of fine arts in the country, and was established in 1908 in Cairo, Egypt.

== Campus ==
Faculty departments are divided among four buildings, divided over four locations as follows:

- Main building, at 08 Abdel Salam Aref Mazloum: the headquarters of the faculty and administration offices, and also includes the architecture department and sculpture department
- Gelim building, at 64 Mustafa Fahmy–Gelim: the printmaking department
- Janaklis building, at 625 Tareek El Horreya: painting department, and faculty offices
- Omar Tosson Pasha building, at 9 El Ezaa St.: decoration department, wall/mural painting and preparatory arts
