= Sliman Mansour =

Palestinian painter and sculptor (1947–2026)

- سليمان منصور
- Born: 27 July 1947; Birzeit, Ramallah, Mandatory Palestine
- Died: 24 August 2026 (aged 79); East Jerusalem, Israeli-occupied Palestinian Territories
- Resting place: Birzeit, Ramallah and al-Bireh, Palestine
- Other names: Suleiman Mansour; Suliman Mansour
- Education: Bezalel Academy of Arts and Design
- Occupations: Visual artist; author; cartoonist
- Known for: Painting; sculpture
- Notable work: The Camel of Hardships (1973)
- Style: Contemporary Palestinian art
- Movement: Liberation Art Movement
- Website: slimanmansour.com

Sliman Mansour (also Suleiman or Suliman; Arabic: سليمان منصور; 27 July 1947 – 24 August 2026) was a Palestinian painter, sculptor, author, and cartoonist, considered a leading figure among contemporary Palestinian artists. He was considered an artist of intifada whose work captured the cultural concept of sumud. His paintings, which have been exhibited around the world, reflect the Palestinian struggle and include images of women in traditional clothing and Levantine tree-filled landscapes. In 1987, he was part of the New Visions collective that boycotted Israeli supplies and instead used local natural Palestinian materials.

Palestinian artist and scholar Samia Halaby has identified Mansour as part of the Liberation Art Movement and cited his important work as an artist and cultural practitioner before and after the First Intifada.

== Life and career ==
Mansour was born on 27 July 1947, one year before the Nakba, in Birzeit north of Jerusalem. He studied art at the Bezalel Academy of Arts and Design in Jerusalem, graduating in 1970. At the academy, he was taught abstract expressionism, a trend he did not want to study since he wanted to paint more realistic subjects from life. He developed a realist style of painting, depicting the daily life of those living and rooted in Palestine.

In 1987, together with other Palestinian artists such as Vera Tamari, Tayseer Barakat, and Nabil Anani, Mansour founded "New Visions", a collective formed in response to the First Intifada (1987–1993). This collective turned to earthworks and mixed media and assemblage using natural materials derived from the Palestinian environment in order to boycott Israeli art supplies in protest of the ongoing occupation. Mansour used mud for the soil. His childhood memories of working with his grandmother when she was building beehives and ovens with mud inspired him. He was always around her, trying to help: "So when I thought about material that I could use, mud was the first thing that came to my mind. After a while, once I started making figures, I realized that the mud also reflects the human fate with the cracks, people waiting to disappear, fall down and go away."

In 1988 he made a series of four paintings on destroyed Palestinian villages, the four villages being Yibna, Yalo, Imwas and Bayt Dajan.

He was a co-author of the book Both Sides of Peace: Israeli and Palestinian Political Poster Art, published in 1998 by the Contemporary Art Museum with University of Washington Press. Mansour wrote two books on traditional Palestinian clothing and embroidery.

Mansour contributed extensively to the development of an infrastructure for the fine arts in Palestine. He taught at numerous cultural institutions and universities, including Al-Quds University. He was the head of the League of Palestinian Artists from 1986 to 1990. In 1994, Mansour co-founded al-Wasiti Art Center in East Jerusalem. He was a member of the Founding Board of Directors of the International Academy of Art Palestine, established in 2004.

He was a contributing artist to the I Witness Silwan art installation in East Jerusalem.

Mansour died in Jerusalem on 24 August 2026, at the age of 79, having been treated at Makassed Hospital for a long illness. A funeral was held two days later at St. Peter's Anglican Church in his native Birzeit, where his body was buried.

== Publications ==
- Sliman Mansour, Nabil Anani: Catalog of the Palestinian Embroidery motifs
- Sliman Mansour, Nabil Anani: Guide to the Palestinian Art of Embroidery. Amman: Inaash Al-Usra Association and Al Abliyya Publishing, 2011. (Language of Book: Arabic, contains enough imagery to be enjoyed and used by non-Arabic speakers)

== Awards ==
- 1998 – Grand Nile Prize, Seventh Cairo Biennial, Egypt
- 1998 – Palestine Prize for the Visual Arts
- 2019 – UNESCO-Sharjah Prize for Arab Culture
- 2025 – Necip Fazıl Awards, Istanbul, Turkey

== Bibliography ==
- Made in Palestine Exhibition Catalogue by James Harithas. Station Museum, May-October, 2003 / preface by Tarif Abboushi; introduction by James Harithas; essays by Tex Kerschen ... [et al.]. Houston: Ineri Publishing and Station Museum, 2003. ISBN 0-9659458-1-2 (The first museum exhibition of contemporary Palestinian art in the USA, went on to tour throughout the country.)
- Visit Palestine: A Voyage Through Contemporary Art, exhibition catalog. Amman: Gallery 4 Walls, 2005.
- Gannit Ankori: Palestinian Art. London: Reaktion Books, 2006. ISBN 978-1-86189-259-1. Pages 60–92.
- Annelys de Vet (with the help of Palestinian artists, photographers and designers): Subjective Atlas of Palestine. 010 Publishers, 2007 ISBN 978-90-6450-648-2 & Subjective Editions, 2024 ISBN 978-906-450-648-2 (Contributors: Sameh Abboushi, Majd Abdel Hamid, Senan Abdelqader, Mohammed Amous, Tayseer Barakat, Sami Bandak, Baha Boukhari, Mahmoud Darwish (poem), Reem Fadda, Shadi Habib Allah, Majdi Hadid, Shuruq Harb, Dima Hourani, Khaled Hourani Munther Jaber, Khaled Jarrar, Abed Al Jubeh, Hassan Khader (foreword), Yazan Khalili, Sliman Mansour, Basel Al Maqousi, Sani P. Meo, Inas Moussa, Hafez Omar, Hosni Radwan, Awatef Rumiyah, Ahmad Saleem, Shareef Sarhan, Majed Shala, Sami Shana’ah, Maissoon Sharkawi, Mamoun Shrietch, Lena Sobeh, Mohanad Yaqubi, Inass Yassin)
- Faten Nastas Mitwasi (artist and art coordinator at the Art Museum of Bethlehem): Sliman Mansour: Ein Künstler aus Palästina. Standhaftigkeit und Kreativität = an artist from Palestine : steadfastness & creativity [Hrsg.: Jerusalemverein e.V. im Berliner Missionswerk in Zusammenarbeit mit dem Internationalen Begegnungszentrum Bethlehem/Palästina; Übersetzung: Almut Nothnagle (deutsch), Khalil Touma (englisch), Salameh Rizqallah (arabisch)]. Petersberg: Michael Imhof Verlag, 2008. ISBN 978-3-86568-370-0 (Languages: German, English, and Arabic)
- Sliman Mansour (with essays by Bashir Makhoul, Nicola Gray and Tina Sherwell). Jerusalem: Palestinian Art Court-Al Hoash, 2011. ISBN 978-9950-352-01-8

== See also ==
- Palestinian art
- New Visions
- Tatreez, the art of embroidery in Palestine

== Sources ==
- Ankori, Gannit (2006), Palestinian Art, Reaktion Books, ISBN 1-86189-259-4
