= International Academy of Art Palestine =

Art school in Ramallah, Palestine

- جامعة بيرزيت
- Established: 2006
- Location: Ramallah, West Bank, Palestine

The International Academy of Art Palestine (Arabic: الأكاديمية الدولية للفنون, romanized: Al-Akādīmīyah al-Dawlīyah lil-Funūn) is an art school in Ramallah, Palestine, founded in 2006. The initiative and idea to establish the academy came from the Norwegian artist Henrik Placht. He started the work in 2002 and left when the academy was up and running in 2009.

It is organised by Palestinian Association for Contemporary Art in partnership with Oslo National Academy of the Arts and Birzeit University.
