= Marina Towers (Beirut) =

- Marina Tower and part of Marina Garden on the right hand side. Marina Court is under construction in the background.
- Interactive map of the Marina Towers area

General information
- Type: Residential
- Location: Beirut, Lebanon
- Coordinates: 33.9017°N 35.4989°E
- Owner: Private investment

Height
- Roof: 150 m (490 ft) (Marina Tower)

Technical details
- Floor count: 26 (Marina Tower), 11 (Marina Court) and 9 (Marina Garden)
- Floor area: 54,000 m^{2} (580,000 sq ft)

Design and construction
- Architect: Kohn Pedersen Fox Associates
- Developer: stow

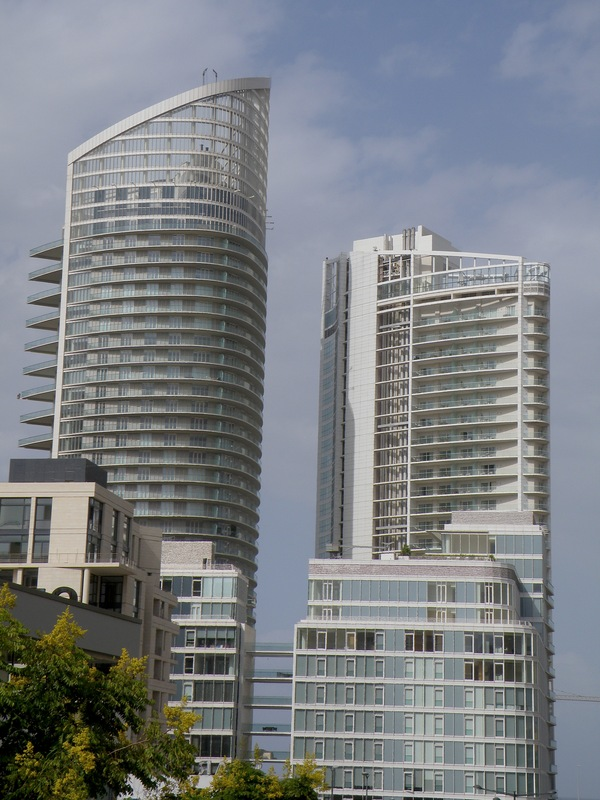
Marina Tower and the Four Seasons Hotels and Resorts Tower (right)

Marina Towers project is a residential complex in Beirut Central District, Lebanon. It is located near the Beirut Marina and consists of a high-rise apartment building, Marina Tower, and two mid-rise apartment buildings, Marina Court and Marina Garden. The Marina Towers project is built on over 7,000 square metres of land with the main tower reaching a height of 150 metres, making it the second tallest building in Lebanon. The Marina Towers project is on the Mediterranean Sea. The project consists of three distinct elements, covering over 2000 square metres of land.

== The Tower ==
The orientation of the Marina Tower is set on the radial axis of the harbor. A crescent shape has been used in the design of the structure.

== The Garden ==
Directly adjacent to the Marina Tower is the Marina Garden, an area offering the choice of smaller, units.

== The Court ==
As a complement to the Tower and Garden, the Court offers space with smaller surface areas.

== See also ==
- Ministry of Tourism
- Tourism in Lebanon
- Beirut Central District
