= Beirut Central District =

Coordinates: 33°54′01″N 35°30′06″E

Beirut Downtown وسط بيروت
- Central business district
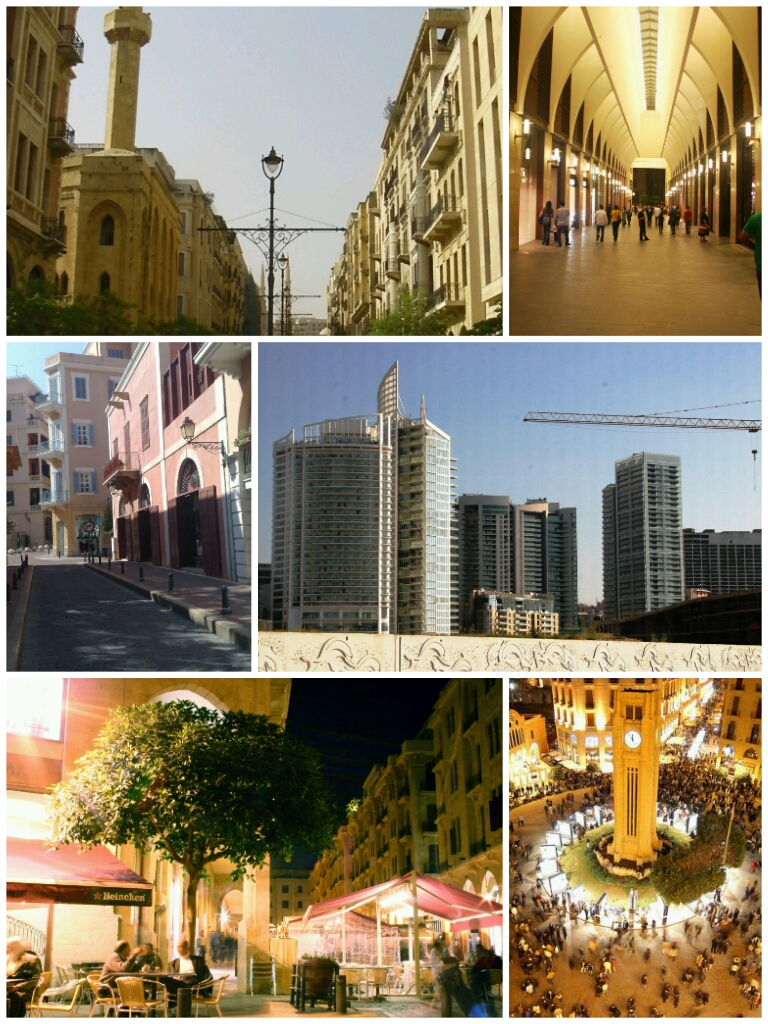
- Clockwise from top left: Downtown buildings, Beirut Souks, New Waterfront towers, Nejmeh Square, Rue Maarad, Saifi Village
- Interactive map of Beirut Downtown
- Country: Lebanon
- Governorate: Beirut Governorate

Area
  - Total: 191 ha (470 acres)

Population
  - Total: 40,000
  - Density: 21,000/km^{2} (54,000/sq mi)
- Time zone: UTC+02:00 (UTC+03:00 +3)
- Website: www.solidere.com/beirut-city-center

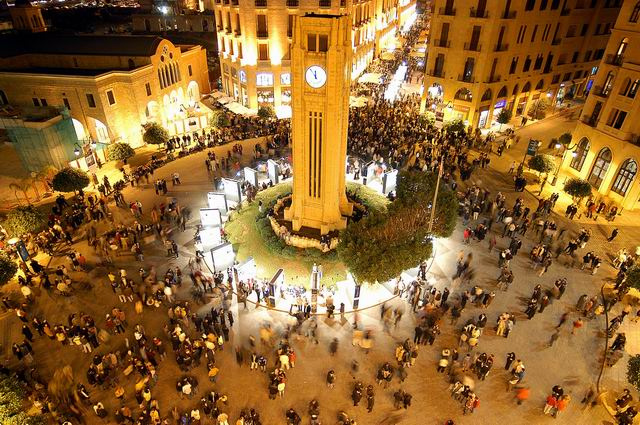
Nejmeh square is the heart of the Beirut City Center.

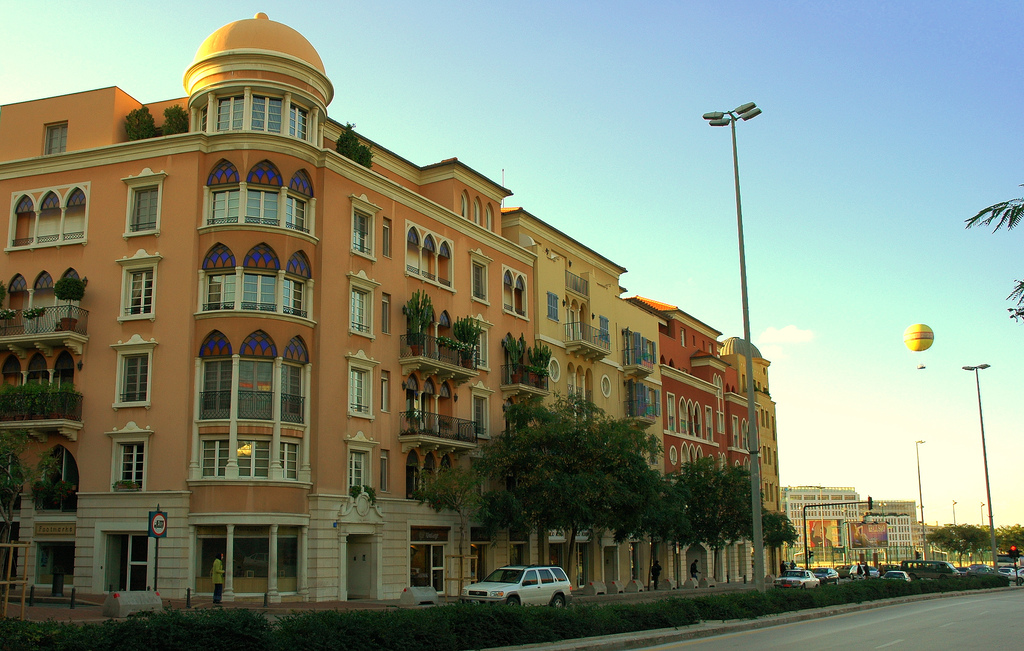
Saifi neighborhood in the BCD

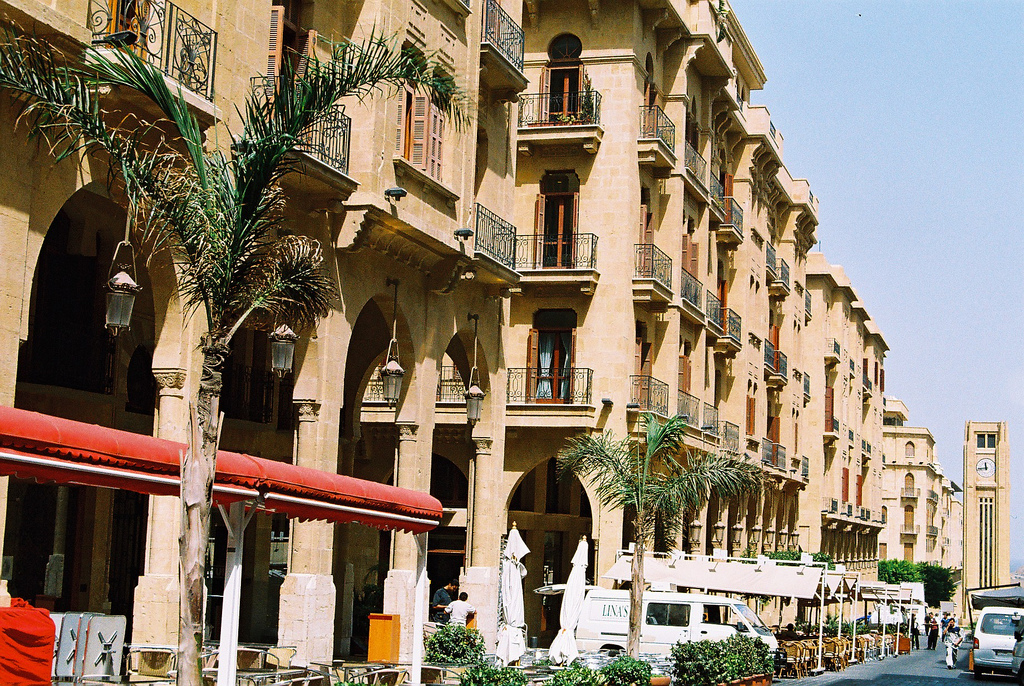
Rue Maarad is a main street in the central district.

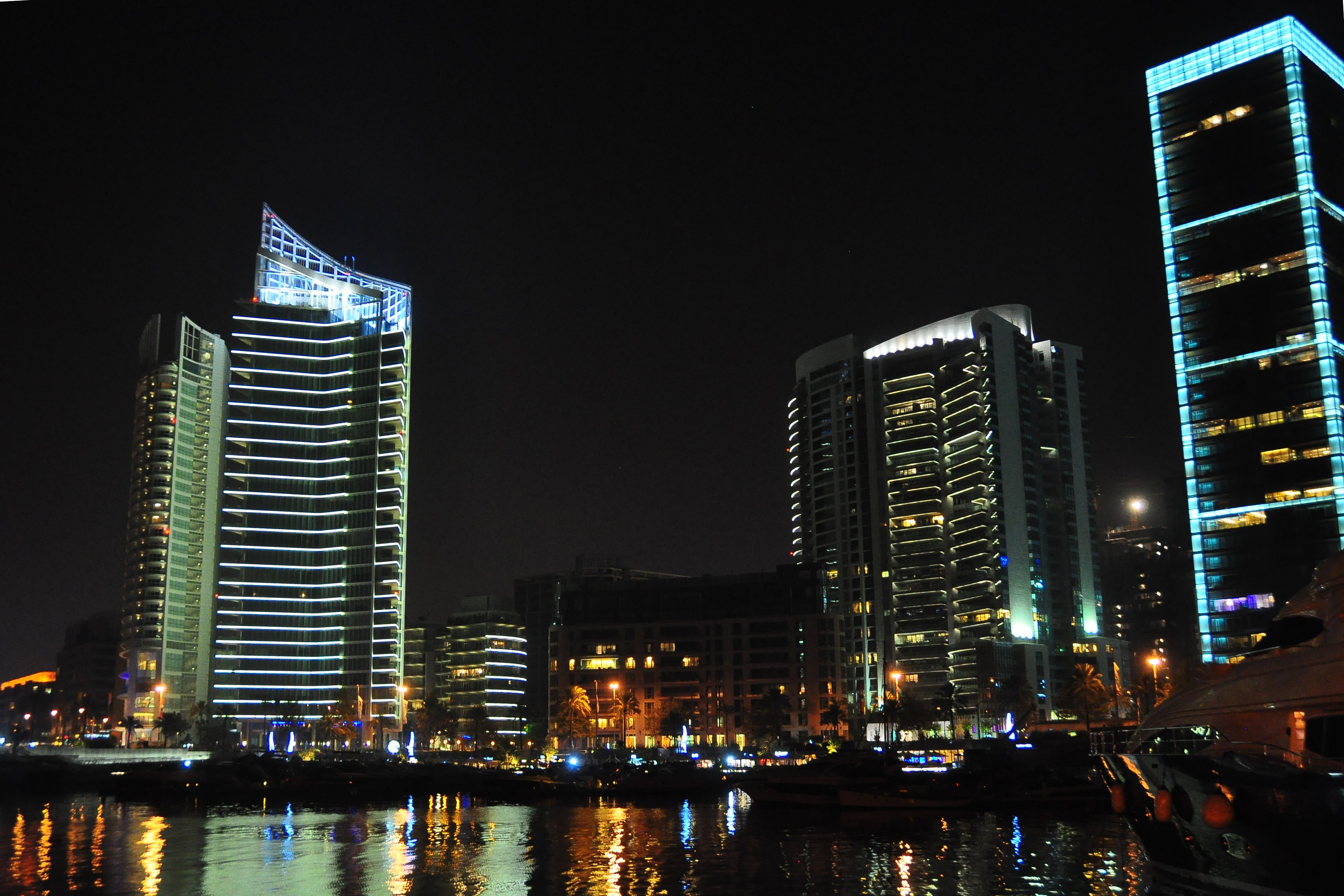
The Waterfront towers in Zaitunay Bay at night

The Beirut Central District, historically named "Al-Balad", is the historical and geographical core of Beirut, the capital of Lebanon. Also called downtown Beirut, it has been described as the “vibrant financial, commercial, and administrative hub of the country.” It is thousands of years old, with a traditional focus on business, finance, culture, and leisure.

The area is situated on the city's northern coast and is easily accessible from all parts of the city. This includes the adjacent Beirut Seaport and Rafik Hariri International Airport. Major roads converge on it or from boundaries to the east, south and west, or line its 1.5 km (1 mi) long seafront to the north.

After the city center was destroyed by the Lebanese Civil War, Beirut underwent thorough reconstruction and development, which restored its cultural and economic position in the region. A master plan for reconstructing the city was officially approved by the Lebanese Government in March 1994 after a series of detailed studies alongside public and professional seminars. On May 5, 1994, Solidere, the Lebanese company for the development and reconstruction of the Beirut Central District was formed, launching the largest urban redevelopment project of the 1990s. Ever since, Beirut Central District has evolved into an integrated business and commercial environment.

Today, Beirut Central District hosts the Grand Serail of Beirut, Lebanese Parliament, the Lebanese Government headquarters, the Beirut Stock Exchange, the regional offices of the United Nations, International Labour Organization, UNESCO, World Bank, as well as the headquarters of the ESCWA and the Union of Arab Banks.

== Culture and heritage projects ==
=== Heritage Trail ===
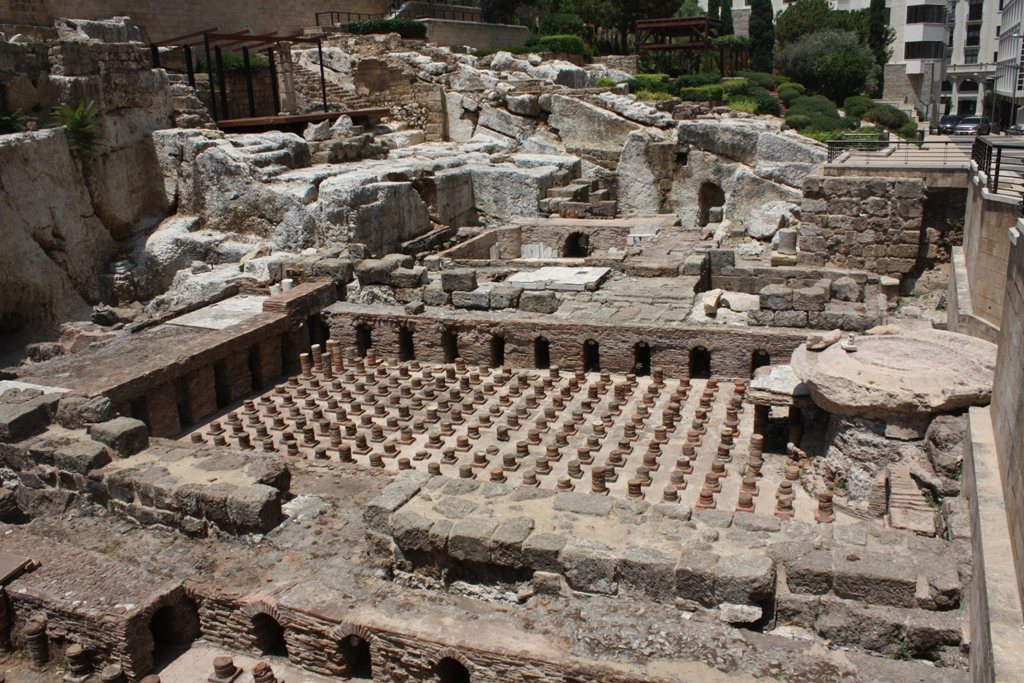
Ruins in the Roman Baths Garden

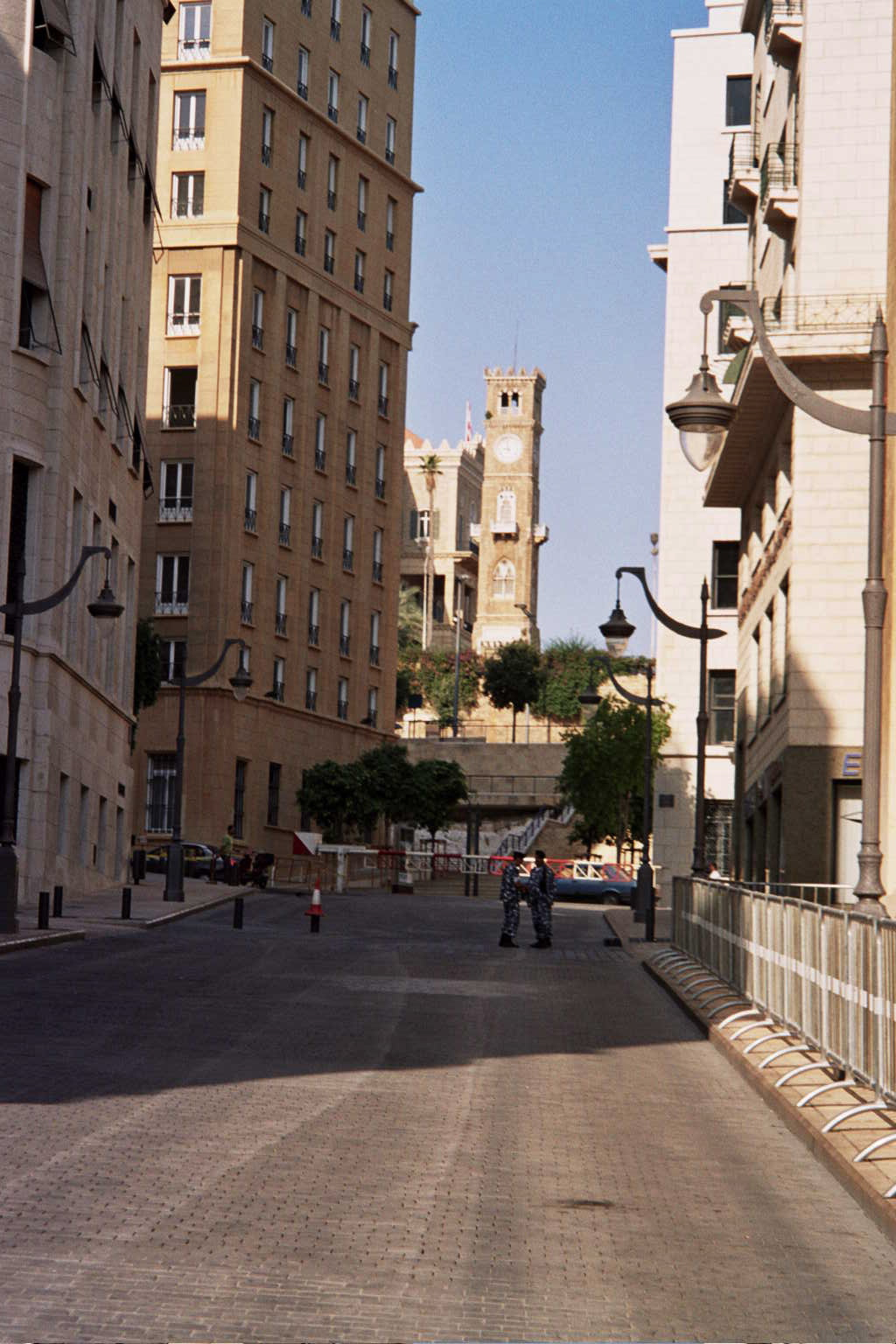
The Hamidiyi Clock-tower

The Heritage trail is a pedestrian circuit in the city's historic core and the traditional Beirut city center. The trail connects the main archaeological sites, places of historic interest, monuments and heritage buildings which are important to Beirut's past. The trail's path is marked by bronze medallions grouted into the sidewalk, with general or district panels and smaller monument panels made from glazed lava stone tiles with texts in three languages (Arabic, French, English). The Heritage Trail is planned to start and end at the "City History Museum" on the ancient Tell Area. In an initial phase, pending the completion of the museum, the circuit will start at Beirut Souks, which retain the 2500-year-old street grid and Ottoman access gates, and several other archaeological remains like the Phoenician-Persian quarter, Byzantine mosaics, old city wall and moat. The trail is divided into four major sections:

- First Route: The first route in the heritage trail covers the ancient archaeological "Tell Area". This site receives much attention due to its significant historical importance, integrating several neighboring vestiges: preserved part of the Canaanite wall and gate, Phoenician glacis, Hellenistic remains, crusader castle foundations above earlier Roman fortifications, and remains of the Ottoman citadel. A sinuous underground path guides visitors through Canaanite, Phoenician-Persian, Hellinistic, Roman, Byzantine and Medieval ages.
- Second Route: This section of the Heritage Trail will straddle along several Beirut landmarks and buildings like the Town Hall, Parliament, Mohammad Al-Amin Mosque, Saint George Maronite Cathedral, and Garden of Forgiveness. The route will also stroll along the streets of Maarad leading up to the Grand Theater historic building and stone churches and Mamluk-era mosques.
- Third Route: This segment of the pedestrian circuit revolves around the "Roman Baths Garden" and the Grand Serail. The Roman Baths Garden at the base of the Serail Hill exhibits brick vaults, remains of ventilation networks, old water heating apparatuses, bathing areas among other archaeological remains from the bathhouse. The route also passes by gardens, fountains, Olive and Pine groves, a small amphitheatre, leading up to the hilltop where the route terminates at the Grand Serail, Hamidiyi Clock-tower, Council of Reconstruction and Development, and the St. Louis Capuchin crusader church.
- Fourth Route: The fourth route in the Heritage trail lies within the Beirut Souks area. This route contains the Phoenician-Persian quarter, Roman-Byzantine findings, part of the Medieval moat and the Ottoman wharf. Other points of interest along the route are the "Zawiyat Ibin Iraq" shrine, Majidiyya Mosque, and the "Antoun Bey Caravanserai". Another section of the route displays a late Roman house with an internal garden paved with mosaics and an elaborate water and drainage system, Byzantine portico paved with mosaics and labeled shops, Phoenician storage jars, and Mamluk potter kilns.

=== Shoreline Walk ===
The "Shoreline Walk" is a proposes sequence of connected spaces which form part of the reconstruction of the Beirut city centre. Following the 1975–91 Lebanese Civil War in Lebanon, the Beirut city centre was left devastated, Avenue des Français and the coastline had become a dumping ground, extending the land by more than 600m to the north. The city was once known for its rocky shoreline Cornice, with its avenues of palms and cafés but during the war a rubbish mountain grew from daily waste tipped into the Mediterranean Sea. The ‘Shoreline Walk’ is placed between the natural topography and medieval street layout of the old city, and the engineered grid of the new land-filled area. The first Phoenician settlers arrived in 1220 BC, followed by Romans in 64 BC, Mamluks in 1291 AD, Ottomans in 1516 and the French in 1918. Successive civilisations adjusted the coastline to create harbors that brought wealth to the city.

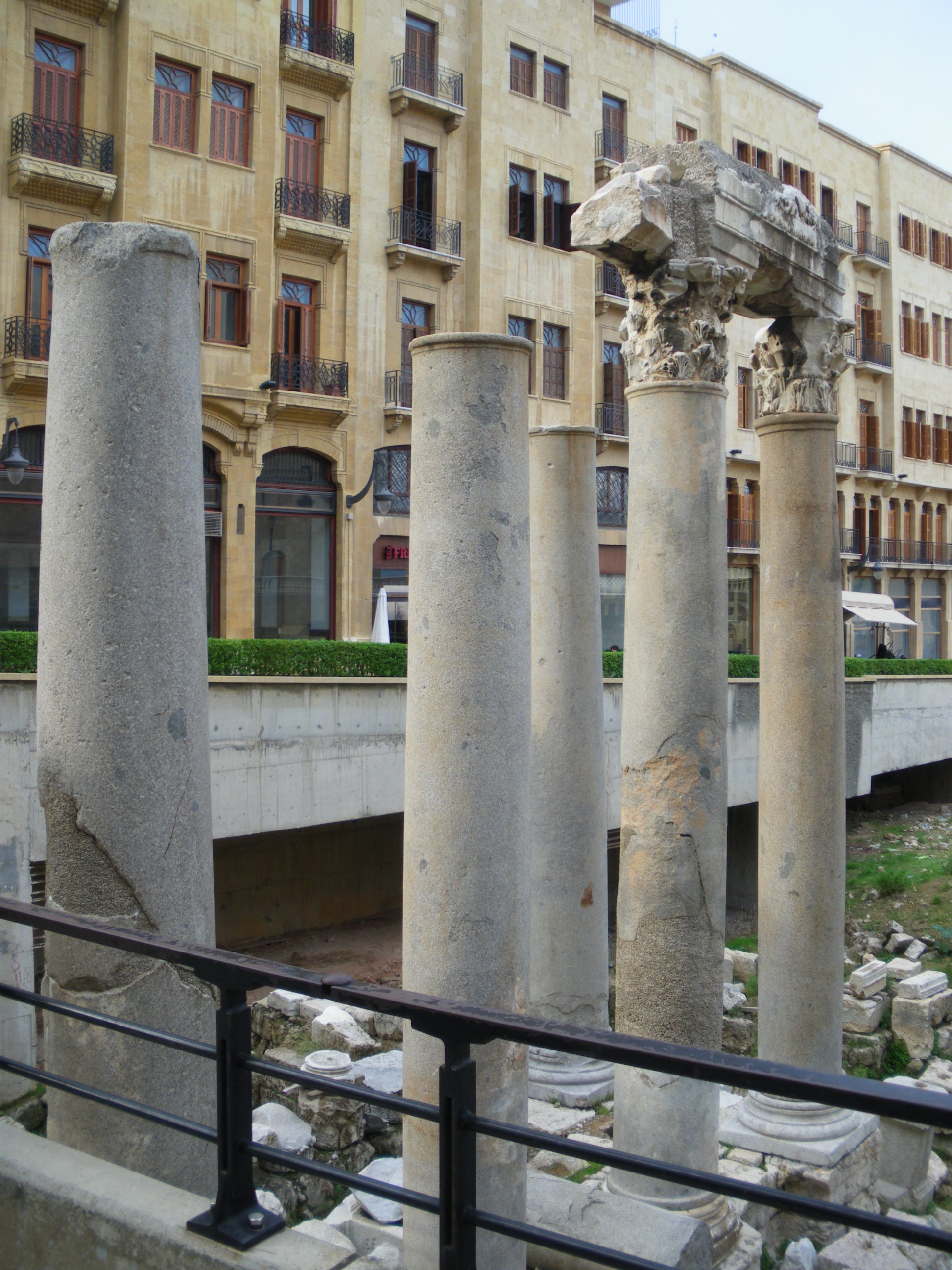
Roman Columns on the Garden of Forgiveness site

=== Garden of Forgiveness ===
The Garden of Forgiveness is a project under development in the BCD. The garden is a socio-cultural project that commemorates the scars of the Lebanese Civil War, hence its location along the Green Line that once divided the city between warring factions. The garden's site is currently filled with uncovered ruins from over fifteen civilizations, most importantly the remains of the Roman city of Berytus. The square is surrounded by three mosques (Mohammad Al-Amin Mosque, Emir Assaf Mosque, Grand Omari Mosque) and three churches (Saint George Maronite Cathedral, St. Elie Greek Melkite Catholic Cathedral, St. Georges Greek Orthodox Cathedral). The archaeological heritage of the site will be respected by referencing the Cardo (main north–south road) and Decumanus (main east–west road). A proposal was also made to add a 9/11 memorial for all the Lebanese victims that went down in the attack.

=== St. Georges Cathedral Museum ===
It is a crypt museum at the St. Georges Greek Orthodox Cathedral on Nejme Square. It is a small museum that reveals layers of Christian heritage belonging to a series of seven churches built on the same exact site starting 2000 years ago. The current cathedral stands on layers of relics where at every stage of its existence its people attempted to enlarge and beautify it, adding more murals and icons. The museum is a crypt underneath the cathedral where oil lamps, pipes, clay and terra cotta pots, miniature statues, and crosses found in various digs are displayed. Glass panels cover some of the crypt's relics and a glass partition separates the crypt from the church's altar directly above it. A narrow metal walkway leads visitors through the twelve stops of the crypt displaying tombstones, mosaics, burial chambers, engravings on stones and columns, well-preserved skeletons, a covered canal, and part of an ancient paved road. The ruins and findings were excavated by Lebanese archaeologists before the cathedral underwent restoration; they aimed at locating the Byzantine church Anastasis, which according to ancient texts is believed to be near Beirut's famous law school before it was leveled by the 551 earthquake.

=== Planet Discovery ===
Planet Discovery is the only permanent children's museum in Lebanon. It is located in Souk Ayyas in Beirut Souks. The museum was inaugurated in 1999. Relocated to Beirut Souks from Minet El-Hosn, the museum is home to a variety of exhibitions on science and technology. The museum focuses on a handful of themes.

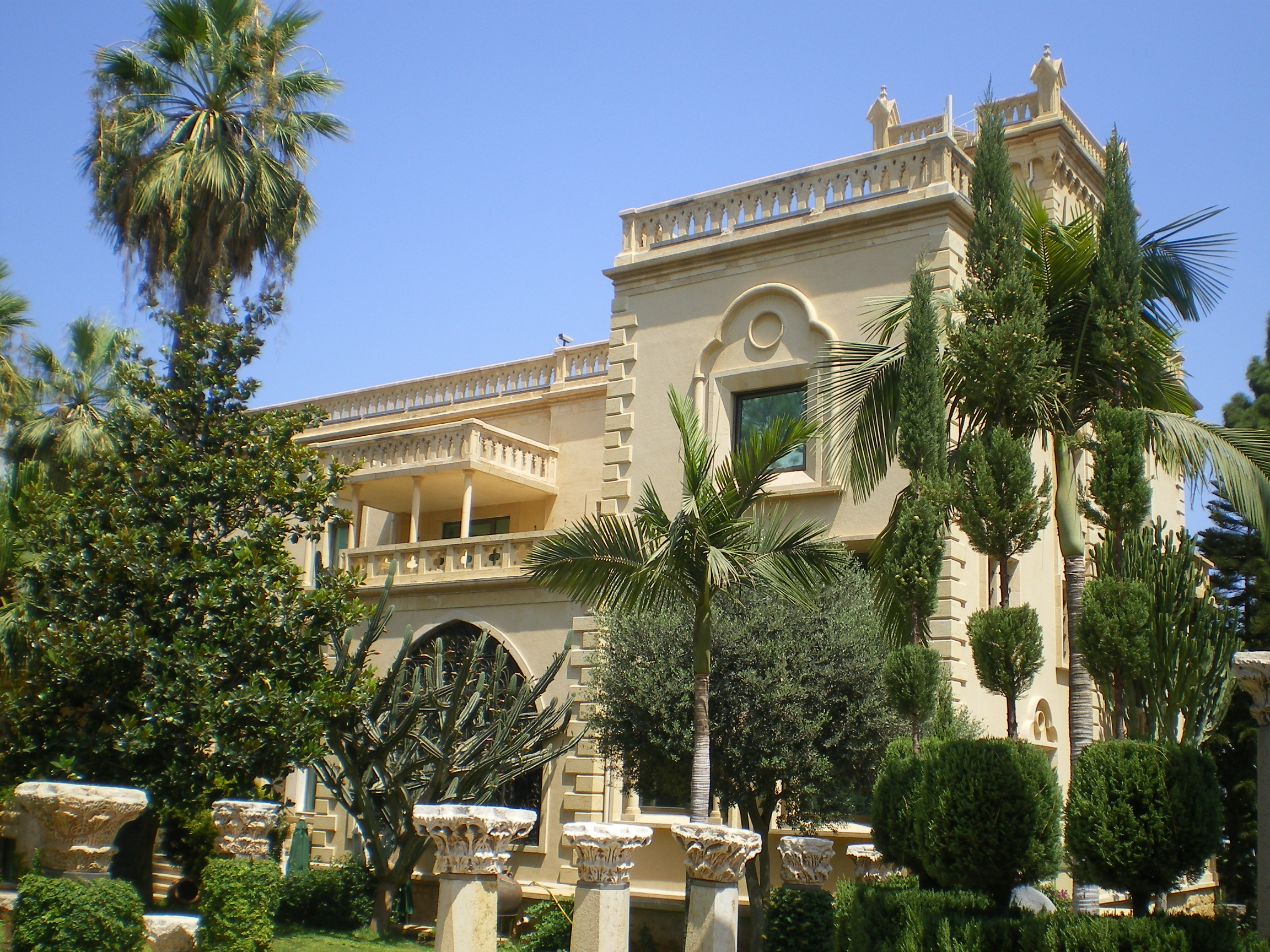
Exterior of the Robert Mouawad Museum

=== Robert Mouawad Private Museum ===
The Robert Mouawad Private Museum is a private residence in the Wadi Abu Jamil quarter that was turned into a museum by Lebanese businessman Robert Mouawad. The palace was built by the Lebanese politician and art collector Henri Philippe Pharaoun in 1911 in Beirut. The museum houses a combination of art objects oriental and occidental cultures, and a rare collection of books, Chinese porcelain, ceramics, and other objects.

The palace's architecture and design reflects Pharaoun's infatuation with Islamic Art and decorative wooden panels that date back to the 19th century, especially after his travels to Syria. Other displayed artifacts include Byzantine mosaics, Roman marble sculptures, jars and jugs, historical columns, pottery, ancient weapons, carpets, jewelry pieces, rare precious stones, Melkite Catholic icons, and preserved manuscripts.

=== Souk El Tayeb ===
Souk el Tayeb is an open-air weekly market held every Saturday at Trablos street in Beirut Souks (previously located in Saifi). The word souk is Arabic for market and tayeb means good. It began as an organic market, but soon changed to be a farmers’ market of fresh, local, and seasonal food products, that promotes small-scale farmers and producers.

The market offers green vegetables, tomatoes, fresh aromatic herbs, pulses, Pomegranate juice, Kibbeh, freshly squeezed carrot juice, a honey distiller, Makdous, Lebanese pastries, fruits, olives, Rose Water, homemade pickled vegetables, Labneh, Manakish made on the Saj, Markook bread ... etc. The market is organized and run by a non-profit cooperative organization. The organization work to promote and preserve Lebanese food and culinary traditions, rural heritage and natural environment. Souk el Tayeb has achieved over the years an economically viable and socially responsive approach to supporting small-scale farmers and producers.

=== Conservatoire Libanais ===
Le Conservatoire libanais national supérieur de musique, or the Lebanese National Higher Conservatory of Music, was founded in the 1930s by Wadia Sabra, composer of the national anthem of Lebanon. In 1953, President Camille Chamoun along with the Minister of Education, ordered the creation of a board to manage the conservatory and the "Friends of Music" foundation was created to help finance the conservatory.

In 1959, the Conservatoire became an Autonomous National Institution under the supervision of the Minister of Education. During the Lebanese Civil War (1975-1991) the National Conservatoire suffered great damage: all the instruments, documents and the library were looted and burnt. The Conservatoire resumed teaching in 1991 and was upgraded in 1995 to a National Institution of Higher Education.

The conservatory is headed by the composer and conductor Dr. Walid Gholmieh and has more than 4,800 students and 250 professors in more than 9 branches. The conservatory is home to the Lebanese National Symphony Orchestra, the Lebanese Philharmonic Orchestra (LPO) & the Lebanese Oriental Orchestra (LOO), that perform yearly more than 100 concerts and activities devoted to the conservatory's educational mission. Its main headquarters is on the Serail Hill in Downtown Beirut, directly facing the southern gate of the Grand Serail.

=== Beirut City History Museum ===
The Beirut City History Museum is a proposed project on an archaeological site north of Martyrs Square. Excavations on the site in the mid-1990s unearthed such finds as the Phoenician Tell, the Bronze Age city gate and remains from the Persian, Hellenistic, Byzantine, Medieval and Ottoman periods.

== Civic institutions ==
After the reconstruction, the city center regained its role as the focus of civic life in Lebanon. Several institutions relocated there including the Parliament and its related offices, the Government's headquarters, and the Beirut Municipality. The BCD also has a concentration of public agencies, important ministries, and governmental offices, some of which are:

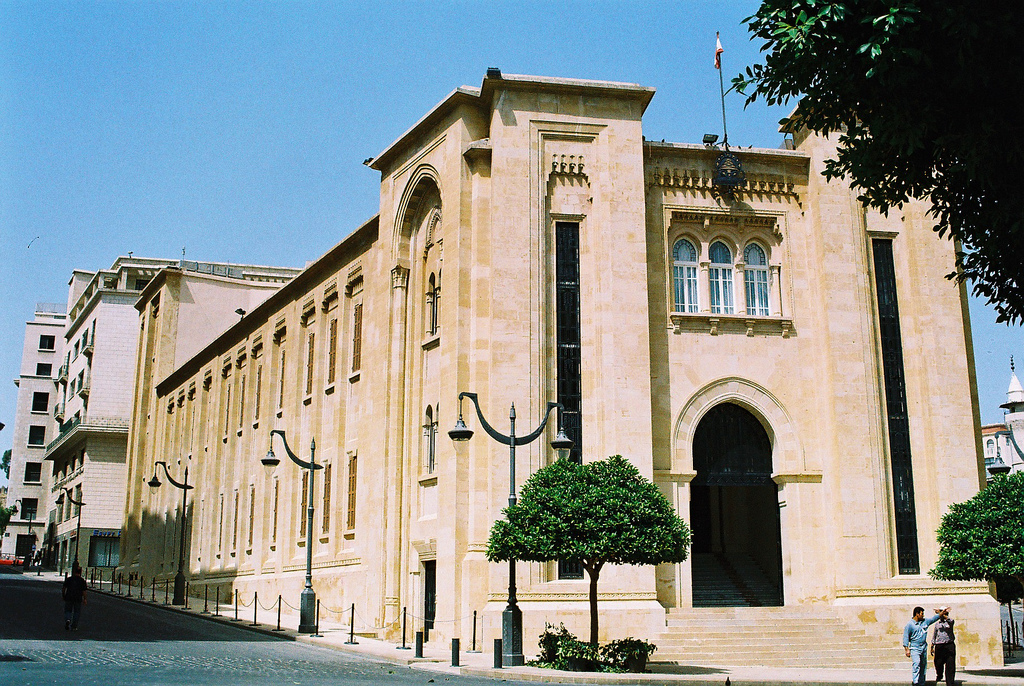
Lebanese Parliament House

- Ministry of Culture and Higher Education
- Ministry of the Displaced
- Lebanese Customs
- Investment Development Authority (IDAL)
- National Economic and Social Council
- Council of Reconstruction and Development (CDR)
- Ministry of Finance
- Ministry of Transportation
- National Statistics Bureau
- Post and Telecommunications
- Ministry of State of Administrative Reform
- Public Audit Court

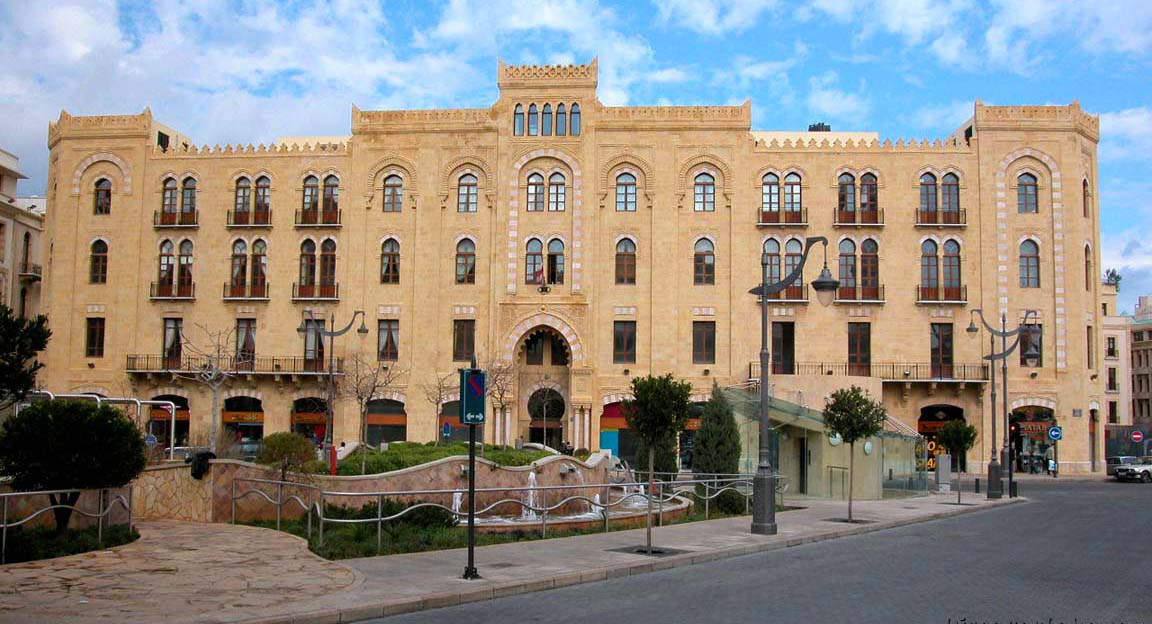
Facade of the Beirut City Hall

=== Beirut City Hall ===
Dating back to 1934, Beirut City Hall building is located on the intersection of Foch Street and Rue Weygand in the city center. The building is in the Venetian and Arabesque architectural styles. The building was restored after the Lebanese Civil War, and currently houses the office of the Governor of Beirut and the municipal council.

=== Grand Serail ===
Built in 1853 as an army barracks atop a hill in central Beirut, the Grand Serail hosts the office of the Prime Minister of Lebanon. The Grand Serail is a historic building, the most important of three Ottoman monuments on the Serail hill. The other two are the Council for Development and Reconstruction and the Hamidiyyeh clock tower. The Grand Serail followed the architectural design epitomizing the new Ottoman military organization.

The building was severely damaged in the Lebanese Civil War; its reconstruction was completed in 1998. The Serail covers 39,700 square meters of floor space. The Grand Serail's four wings are disposed around a courtyard which flanked at the center by a limestone and Carrera marble fountain. Both the exterior and interior facades are covered by a total of 588 arches and arcades. The two upper floors comprise the Prime Minister's residence and office, offices for his staff, as well as the cabinet room and ministers' offices.

== Squares and public spaces ==
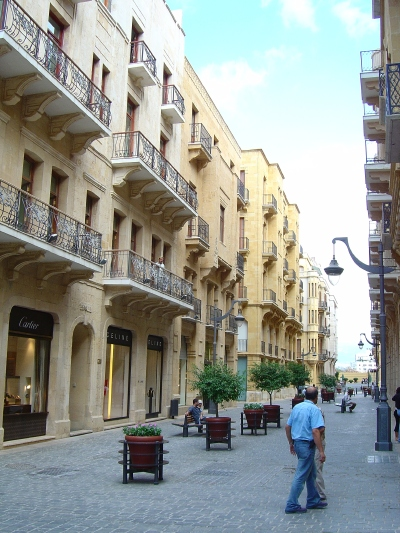
A pedestrian street in the Beirut city center

The Beirut Central District contains over 60 gardens, squares and open spaces. These spaces comprise landscaped streets, gardens, historical squares, pedestrian areas and sea promenades thus totaling to an area of 96 acres (39 ha) of open spaces. This makes the BCD home to 50% of the entire public spaces in Beirut, despite the fact that the BCD itself is only 10% of Beirut City.

=== National Unity Square ===
National Unity Square is a landscaped design garden on the southern slope of the Serail Hill. The garden was originally designed by Vladimir Djurovic in basalt stone; the project was completed in 2009. The garden was conceptualized in a cascading manner as to cope with the sloping nature of the area's topography. The Russian sculptor Maguerditch Mazmanian presented a statue of Lebanese Prime Minister Rafik Hariri depicting him as if walking through the garden. Elongated planes of gray stone and water mirrors, laid on a grass surface, step down towards the city. A row of Jacaranda trees marks the edge between the steps and the Grand Serail’s façade.

=== Khalil Gibran Garden ===
This popular Beirut destination was named after the famous Lebanese-American Poet Khalil Gibran. With an area of 6000 square meters, this garden was landscaped to emphasize its status as a main entrance to the city center. Its landscaped design consists of two circular lawns looking out into the garden and the UN House. Trees surround a blue water fountain and a brick-tiled platform, with six obelisks marking the gates of the garden. Sculptures of abstract art inspired by Khalil Gibran dot the location.

The space also witnessed numerous political protests in the past years adding to the venue's strategic importance. It also hosts, since 2005, a permanent sit-in tent for the demand of the release of Lebanese prisoners in Syria.

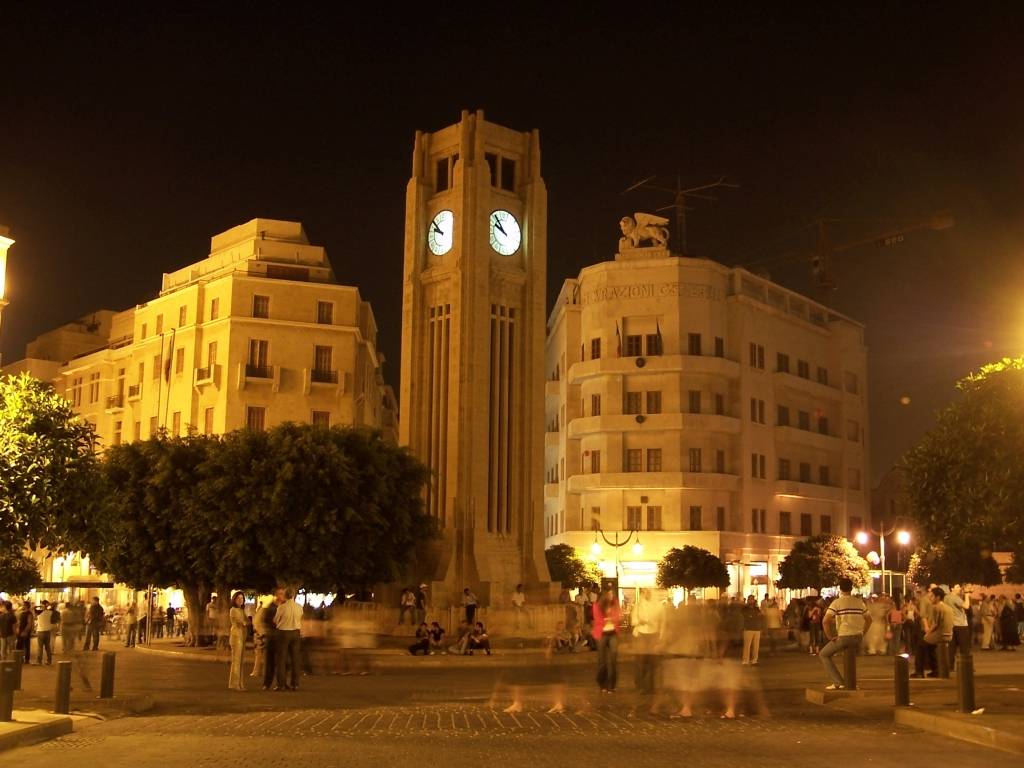
Nejmeh Square in Beirut Central District

=== Omar Daouk Square ===
The Omar Daouk Square is named after the Lebanese politician Omar beik Daouk. This 1,006 square meter square was designed by Mohammad Halawi around a bust by Maguerditch Mazmanian of Omar Daouk himself. The design of the Omar Daouk Square introduces three green terraces that soften the site incline, since it lies on the inclined Omar Daouk Street. The trees and flowers surrounding it create an attractive open area where one can sit and rest.

=== Nejmeh Square ===
Nejmeh Square, or Place de l'Étoile, is the central square in the Downtown area. It is home to the Lebanese Parliament and its complementary buildings, two cathedrals, a museum, and several cafes and restaurants.

The jewel of the square is a 1930s clock-tower with its four-faced Rolex clock. The clock tower was a gift from Lebanese-Mexican émigré Michel Abed. Today, the square is filled with tourists and locals who come here to dine, walk or enjoy the street life. The square is also known for its noticeable population of pigeons.

In 1994, archaeological diggings underneath the Saint George Greek Orthodox Cathedral in Nejmeh Square identified structural elements of the ancient "Anastasis cathedral", but they were restricted to an area of 316 square metres (3,400 sq ft) and failed to unearth the interred Law School of Berytus.

=== Waterside Park ===
An ambitious future project, this park will be the largest park in the city of Beirut once completed. The original plans for the park included a prepared strip along its northwestern edge designed to accommodate the Formula One pits, and other temporary Formula One facilities during Grand Prix events. However, plans for the future Formula One circuit have been abandoned due to demands from the Formula One Committee.

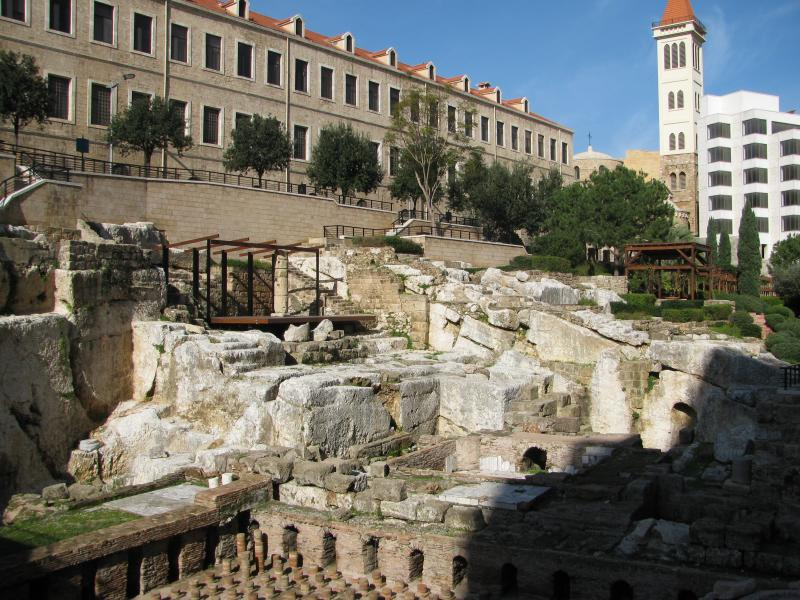
The Roman Baths Garden

=== Roman Baths Garden ===
The "Roman Baths" is a landscaped public space that lies on the eastern slope of the Serail Hill. It consists of a garden and a set of uncovered ruins of ancient Roman baths, hence the name of the place. Originally discovered in 1968–69, the Garden's layout is dominated with low-slung glass walls and lookout platforms that can be turned into concert venues, thus giving a 21st-century touch without harming the area's historical fabric.

=== Sea Corniche ===
Once the Zaitounay Bay, the Corniche promenade, the Eastern Marina, and the Beirut Port First Basin promenade are completed, the city center will provide an uninterrupted 3.5 km (2 mi) corniche along Beirut's shoreline. This new addition will be four times the area of the existing Corniche Beirut.

=== Castle Square Belvedere Park ===
Situated in the central business district of Beirut, "Castle Square Belvedere Park" is a public plaza adjacent to the oldest archaeological site in the city, the "Tell Area". The site, which includes findings that are over 6,000 years old, is the location of the ancient city of Berytus, the Roman origins of modern-day Beirut. The design of the square was conceived by the Boston-based architecture and urban design firm Machado and Silvetti in 2005. The centerpiece of the square is the "Beirut Citadel" which, although significantly reduced in size, still houses visible ruins including portions of a medieval castle and an Ottoman barrack.

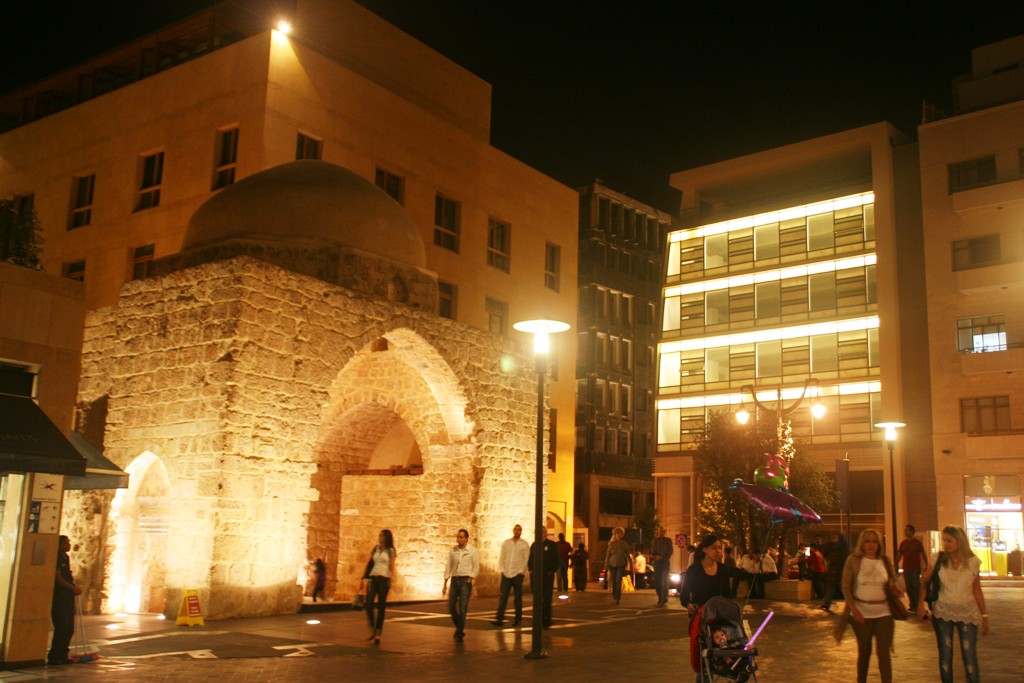
Imam Ouzai Square

=== Imam Ouzai Square ===
The Imam Ouzai Square is part of the Beirut Souks project in the BCD. The square marks the main entrance to the souks from Rue Weygand. The square's floor is tiled with black basalt stone including an oval with outlines of the old Roman pavement, and it hosts an old olive tree in its center. Architecturally speaking, the design of the square integrates several features from its old heritage as well as several elements of modernity. A cupola-topped prayer hall to the left creates a virtual entrance to the square by mirroring a Mamluk-era shrine on the right. Some of the squares features are curved white marble planters surrounding Ibn Iraq monument, white marble circular planters with trees and shrubs; white marble circular steps guiding to Bab Idriss and the Souks upper floors; seating spaces facing the shop fronts, providing shade and emphasizing the entrance towards Souk Tawileh. The square also offers passages to Souk Sayyour and the Gold Souks.

=== Zeytouneh Square ===
Situated at the southernmost point of the Shoreline Walk, Zeytouneh Square forms a key link connecting the different sectors of the central district. Designed by Gustafson-Porter, the company of renowned American landscape architect and artist Kathryn Gustafson, the 600-sq-meters square was inaugurated in 2011, after eight years of designing, planning and construction works. The surface of the Zeytouneh Square extends across the roads to the surrounding buildings, unifying the square as one large space. The bold paving patterns were inspired from the Black and White patterning found in traditional Lebanese houses, with the paving stripes changing with the topography of the landscape. Provided with free wireless internet access, the square's design was complemented with stone benches and Albizia trees, to gradually help the square become a popular hangout place.

=== Samir Kassir Square ===
A square on Rue Weygand street in the Beirut Central District commemorating the late journalist and political activist Samir Kassir. The square is located behind the An-Nahar building, the renowned newspaper headquarters where Kassir used to work. The garden boasts a bronze statue of Kassir done by the French sculptor Louis Derbré. Two historic ficus trees provide shade at the centre of the space, and a reflecting pool with water cascading over its edges marks the border with the street. The pool is flanked by a rectangular timber deck that encircles the two trees, and has at its western side a long bench of solid stone. The edges of the site have a ground cover of dwarf Natal plum (carissa macrocarpa), a water-conserving plant known for its dark evergreen leaves and its white, star-shaped flowers and red berries which grow throughout the year.

=== Martyrs' Square ===
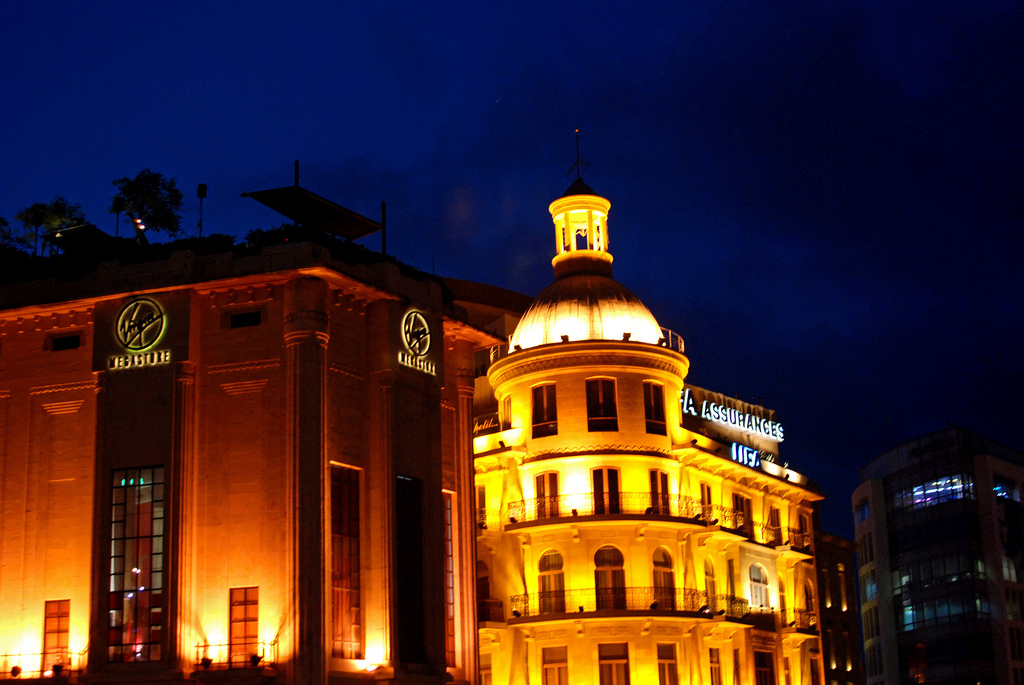
The "Old Opera House" on Martyrs' Square

Synonymous with Lebanon's modern history, Martyrs' Square is a central, and biggest, town square in Beirut and its central district. Initially named "Place des Canons", or "Cannons Square", it was built by the Ottomans during their occupation of Lebanon in the 19th century. During World War I, Beirut suffered from a blockade by the Allies which was intended to starve the Turks out; however, the result was a famine that killed a quarter of Lebanon's population. An unsuccessful revolt against the Turks broke out which resulted in the execution of Lebanese nationalists in the square on 19 May 1916, hence bestowing upon it its current name, "Martyrs' Square". The Square was completely destroyed in the Lebanese Civil War, and reconstruction began in the early 1990s. The "Martyrs' Statue", the iconic bullet-riddled centerpiece of the square, was maintained and restored alongside the old opera house. After the assassination of Prime Minister Rafik Hariri, the square regained its original role as the "throbbing heart of the political life in Lebanon". The Square became ground zero for the political sit-ins, demonstrations, and protests of the Cedar Revolution in 2005. Solidere commissioned the re-designing and landscaping of the square, after an international urban design competition for the Martyrs' Square axis was conducted by an international organization.

=== Khan Antoun Bey Square ===
"Khan Antoun Bey Square" is an under-construction project located in the northern section of the Beirut Souks. The Portuguese landscaping studio PROAP were selected as winners of the architectural landscaping contest, and were hence commissioned by Solidere to design the square. The square's master plan addresses the site's history, location and surroundings, to develop its area as a link between the traditional city center and the newly constructed waterfront district. Once completed, the "Khan Antoun Bey Square" will be a major public plaza where pedestrian routes from the BCD converge. The square is divided into two main areas, a lower plaza and a higher circulation plaza. The transition between the two levels occurs through a pedestrian lane shaping a natural amphitheater and event seating area. Historically, this area used to be a loading dock connecting the harbor with the souqs. The square will pay tribute to this by including water features, re-installing the original harbor wall, and consolidating the remains of the ancient city wall with the square's design.

=== Rafik Hariri Memorial Garden ===
The "Rafik Hariri Memorial Garden" is a public space in the Saint George Bay neighborhood facing the InterContinental Phoenicia Beirut Hotel. The garden pays tribute to the former Lebanese Prime Minister Rafik Hariri and the other 22 victims who died in the massive car bomb attack on 14 February 2005 on the same site. The garden's construction was inaugurated on the third anniversary of the assassination of Rafic Hariri in 2005. The memorial is a 700-square-meter replica of the garden of the Hariri family residence in Qoreitem, with water flowing from the edges of the site and a 6-meter bronze statue of the late premier on top. A bronze pole with a clock and inscriptions of verses from the Lebanese National Anthem stands near Hariri's statue, and each day at 12:55 p.m. - the time of Hariri's killing - the clock emits the sounds of church bells and the Islamic call to prayer for five minutes. In the same five minutes, a flame also rises from a 4-meter statue in the garden in the middle of five bronze Lebanese flags.

== Neighborhoods ==
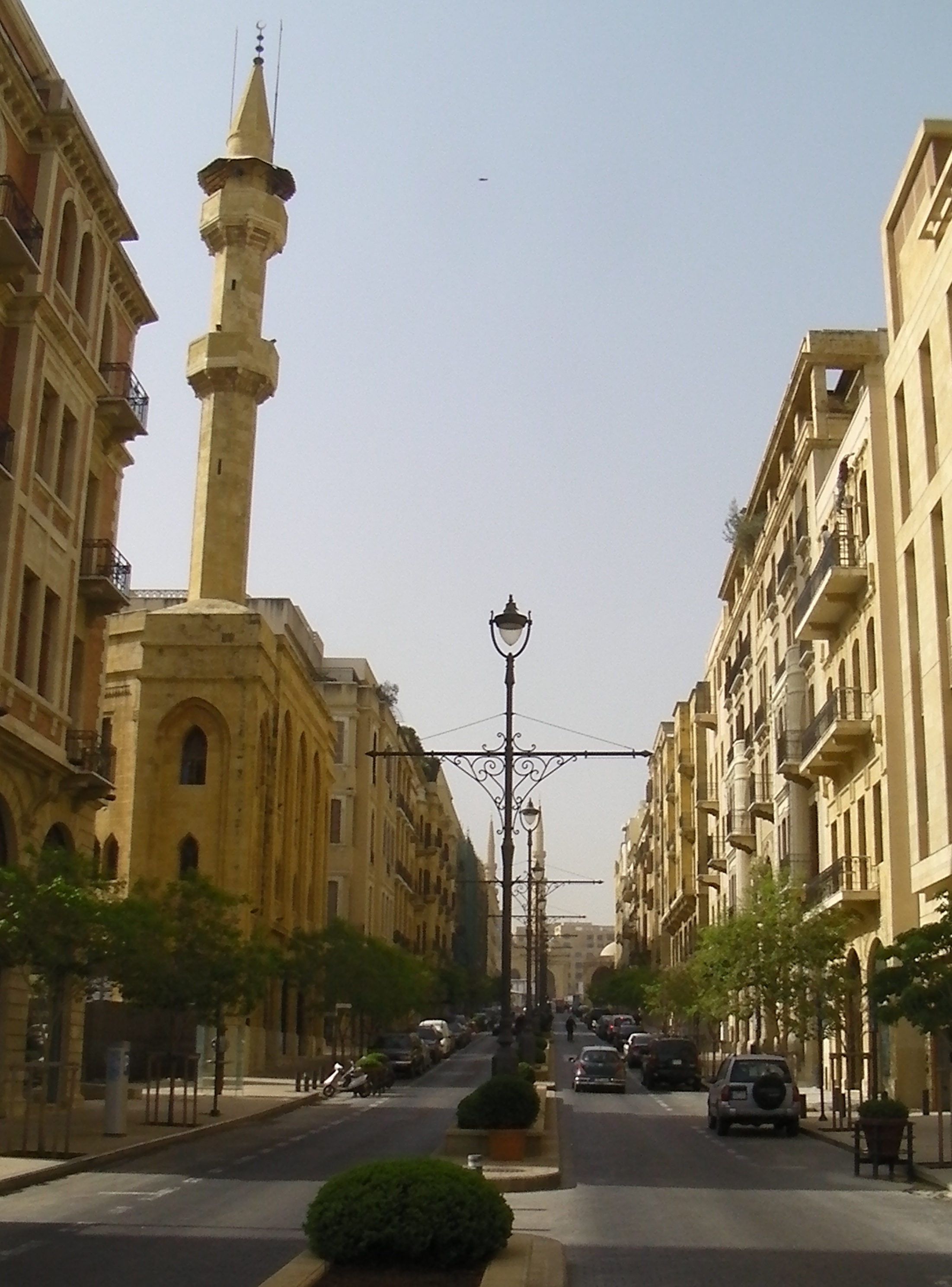
Foch-Allenby neighborhood

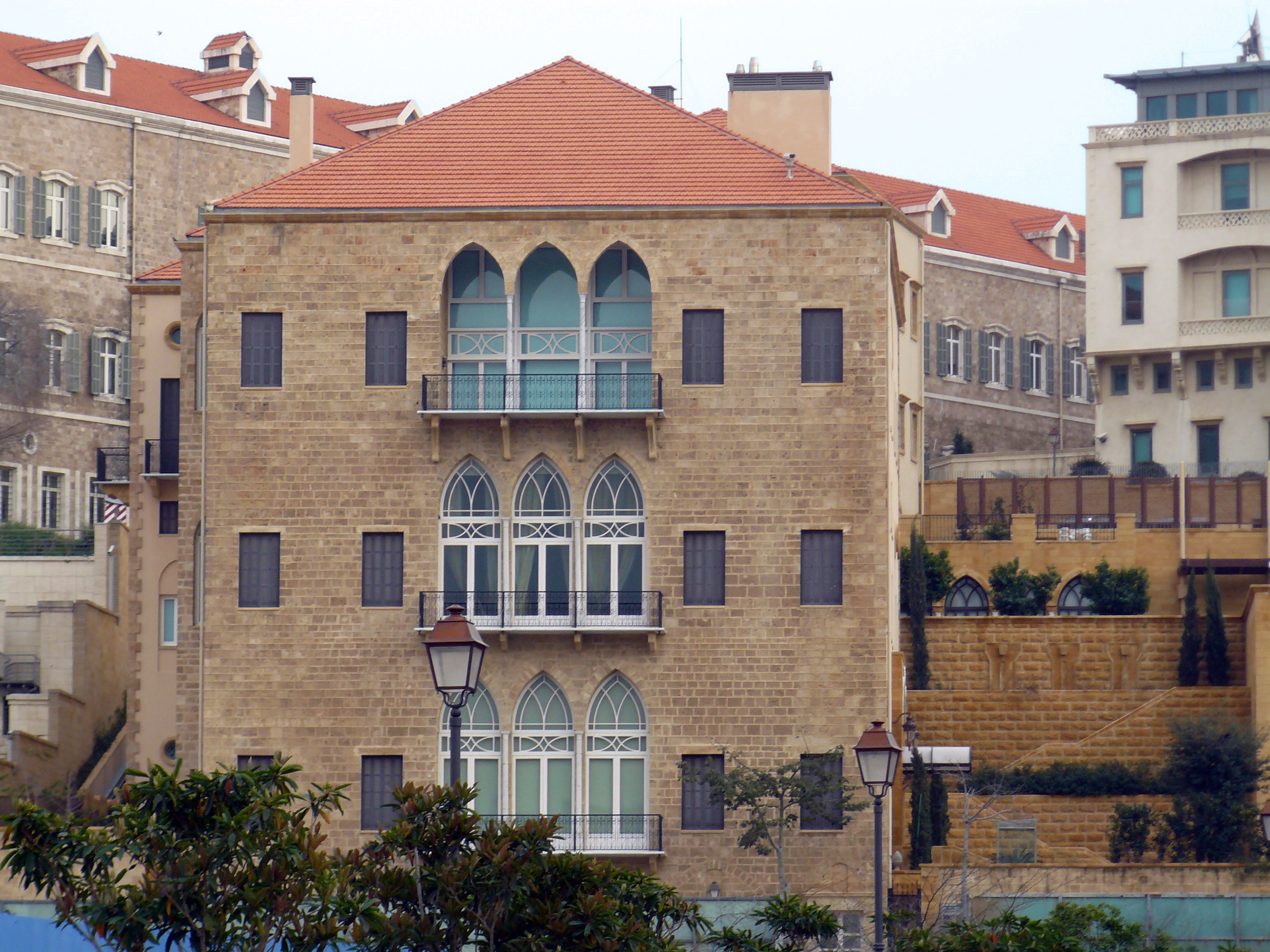
Typical Lebanese houses in the Wadi Abu Jamil neighborhood

- Saint George Bay: The neighborhood along the northern shoreline of the Beirut city center. It is home to the Corniche Beirut, a marina, and the future seaside park. The St. George bay neighborhood hosts hotels and entertainment facilities like the InterContinental Phoenicia Beirut Hotel, Music Hall, and Hard Rock Cafe.
- Foch-Allenby: The Foch-Allenby district is an early 20th-century European-style precinct in Downtown Beirut. The neighborhood is home to old churches and mosques, and was the first office building sector in the city, dating back to the 1920s.
- Serail Hill: The Serail Hill neighborhood is situated on an elevated portion of the Beirut Central District. It is home to the Grand Serail, the Ottoman Clock Tower, the Council for Reconstruction and Development, the Conservatoire Libanais, the Roman Baths Garden, and the Rafik Hariri Sculptural Garden.
- Nejmeh Square-Rue Maarad Area: This area is most notable for its stone elevations, retained buildings, and preserved facades. This area in its current structure and form dates back to the 1930s, and was inspired by the Place de l'Étoile in Paris. The district is home to the Lebanese Parliament and its complementary buildings, and cathedrals and mosques.
- Saifi Village: Located at the southeastern periphery of Downtown Beirut, Saifi Village is composed of 16 buildings organized in four clusters. This is a primarily residential area.
- Beirut Souks: The Souks district is a strip in the Beirut Central District. It is a reconstructed medieval market consisting of a network of alleys and pathways. The old souks were severely damaged during the Lebanese Civil War and were reconstructed]. The souks are home to more than 200 shops, a department store, and a handful of cafes and restaurants.
- Wadi Abu Jamil: Beirut's old Jewish quarter and the center of a formerly thriving Lebanese-Jewish community. The neighborhood is located on elevated grounds in the city center, gently sloping towards the Mediterranean. Largely resembling a Levantine hill town, the neighborhood is filled with clusters of stone buildings with terracotta-tiled pitched roofs and distinct Lebanese-style verandahs.

== Religious buildings ==
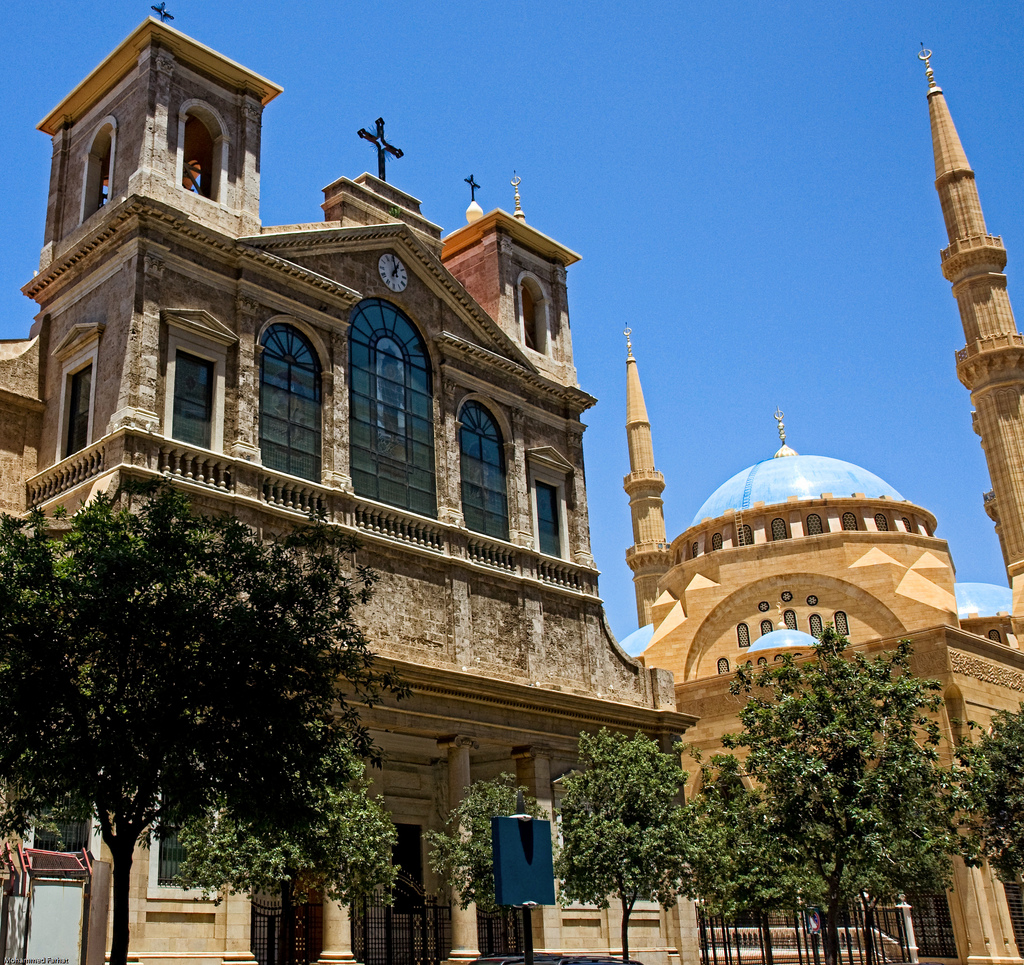
Mohammad Al-Amin Mosque and Saint George Maronite Cathedral sit side by side in Beirut's central district

Mosques and churches lie side by side on the BCD's streets, and some are hundreds of years old and are of archaeological significance. The BCD is home to ten churches, six mosques, and one synagogue located in the Wadi Abu Jamil neighborhood. Despite the severe destruction incurred on these buildings during the Lebanese Civil War, they have been restored and are currently in use.

=== Mohammad Al-Amin Mosque ===
The Mohammad Al-Amin Mosque is a Sunni Muslim mosque located on Beirut's Martyrs' Square. It is most known for being the backdrop of the Cedar Revolution events in 2005. Inspired by the Sultan Ahmed Mosque in Istanbul, this mosque follows the Ottoman architectural style with touches and illustrations in the Mamluk Egyptian style. It is most recognizable for its yellow ochre stone exterior, giant blue domes, and 72-meter-high Mecca-styled minarets. Construction began in 2002 by Prime Minister Rafik Hariri, and was finished in 2007. His son Saad Hariri inaugurated the mosque in a celebration on October 17, 2008. It is the central mosque for the Sunni Muslim denomination in Lebanon.

=== Grand Omari Mosque ===
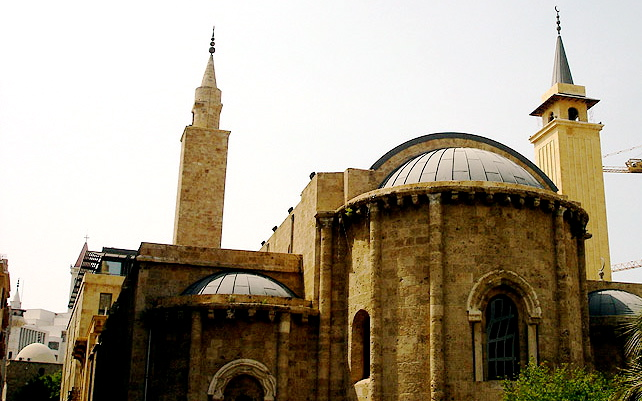
Al-Omari Grand Mosque

Before being eclipsed by Mohammad Al-Amin Mosque, this used to be the central mosque of Beirut. Built in 635 ACE during the reign of Islam's second caliph, Umar Bin El Khattab and named in his honor, this mosque was eventually conquered and converted into a Crusader church. Occupied and reoccupied again and again by warring factions during the Crusades era, this mosque eventually returned to Muslim control in 1291. The mosque's interior sandstone walls are decorated in Mamluk and Ottoman inscriptions. Inside the mosque, a golden steel cage, a gift from Sultan Abdul Hamid II to Beirut, encircles a shrine for John the Baptist. The mosque's Mihrab, a semicircular niche in the wall indicating the qibla, is located on the eastern side, and bears distinct ancient Greek engravings. Three hairs from Muhammad were preserved in the southwestern side of the mosque; they were presented to the mosque by Sultan Abdülmecid I. The Mosque underwent several restorations by the General Directory of Awqaf and the Tourism Ministry, specifically in 1952 and 1949. It sustained severe damages in the Lebanese Civil War, and was attacked several times by militias that slashed the Sahabah names on the walls and stole the hairs. During the reconstruction of the Beirut Central District, the mosque was renovated and enlarged to its current area.

=== Saint George Maronite Cathedral ===
The Saint George Maronite Cathedral is the cathedral of the Maronite Archdiocese in Beirut. After ten years of works started by Monsignor Joseph Debs, the construction of the cathedral was finished in 1894. The church's facade, interior and plan were inspired from the Basilica di Santa Maria Maggiore in the city of Rome. The walls of the church are decorated with stucco and marble. The armchair that Pope John Paul II used during his visit to Lebanon in May 1997 has been preserved in the cathedral's Retroquire.

=== St. Georges Greek Orthodox Cathedral ===
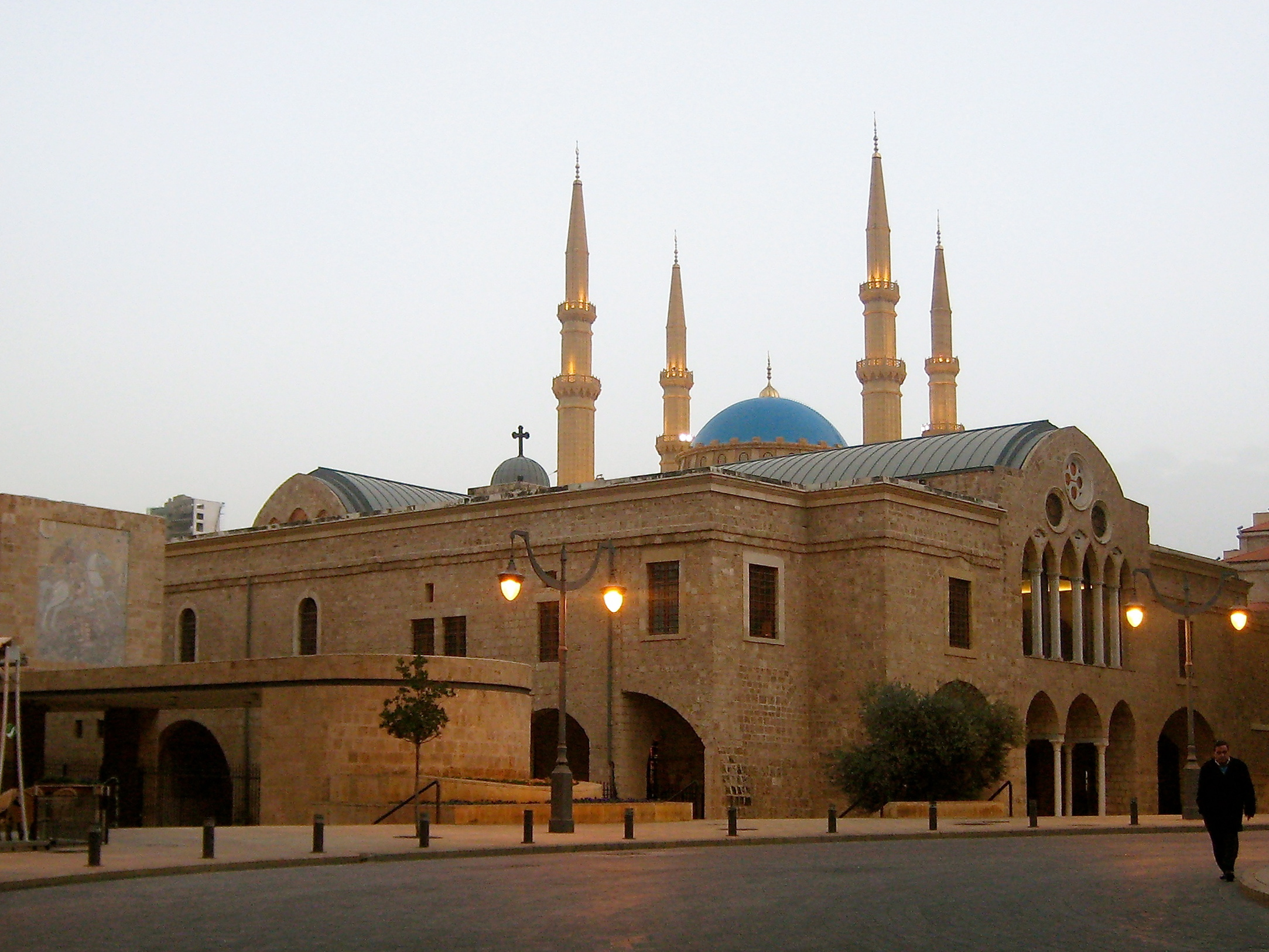
Saint George Greek Orthodox Cathedral on Nejme Square

The Greek Orthodox Cathedral of St. Georges, completed in 1772, is located directly on Nejme Square and is the oldest orthodox church in Beirut. Its location is believed to be directly adjacent to the site of the renowned Roman Law School of Beirut. The church underwent several restorations in its history due to natural disasters, erosion, and intentional destruction. During the Lebanese Civil War, the church was burned and destroyed with most of its belongings stolen. The Greek Orthodox Archbishopric of Beirut began its renovation on October 16, 1995. The excavation at the site led to the discovery of the remains of three other churches and part of the Roman colonnades. These artifacts were incorporated into an underground museum directly located below the cathedral.

=== St. Nishan Armenian Orthodox Church ===
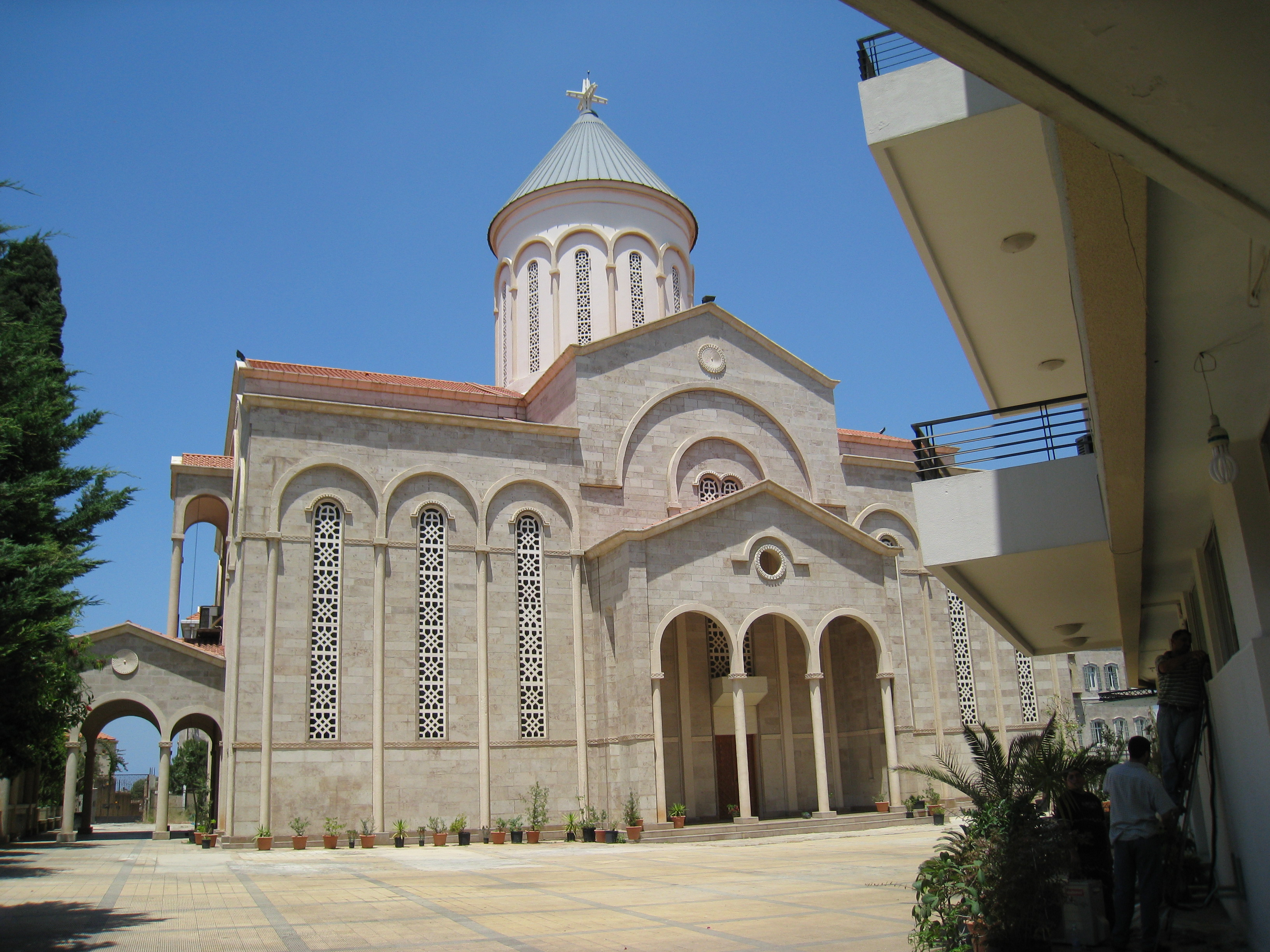
The Armenian Orthodox Church of St. Nishan

This is the only church dedicated for the Armenian Orthodox Church in the Beirut Central District. It is constructed directly on the Serail Hill facing the Serail and the Conservatoire Libanais. Its name means "holy sign", referring to an important relic. The church's exterior is covered with white limestone tiles, while its roof is covered with red bricks and a grey lead dome.

=== Cathedral of Saint Elias and Saint Gregory the Illuminator ===
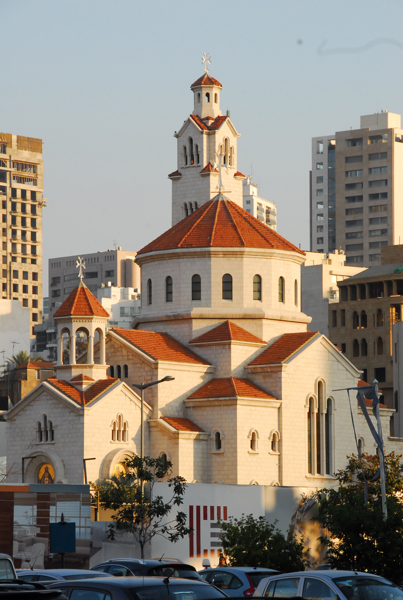
The Catholic Armenian church of St. Elie

The first Armenian Catholic cathedral to be constructed in Beirut, its construction began with the Armenian Catholic Archbishop in 1860. It was severely damaged during the Lebanese Civil War, as it was located along the Green Line. The Archbishopric took control of it in the early 1990s and began restoration works. The church was destroyed several times in history, most notably when it was torn down to be expanded in 1901 and for the construction of the Saints' Convent in 1950.

=== Emir Assaf Mosque ===
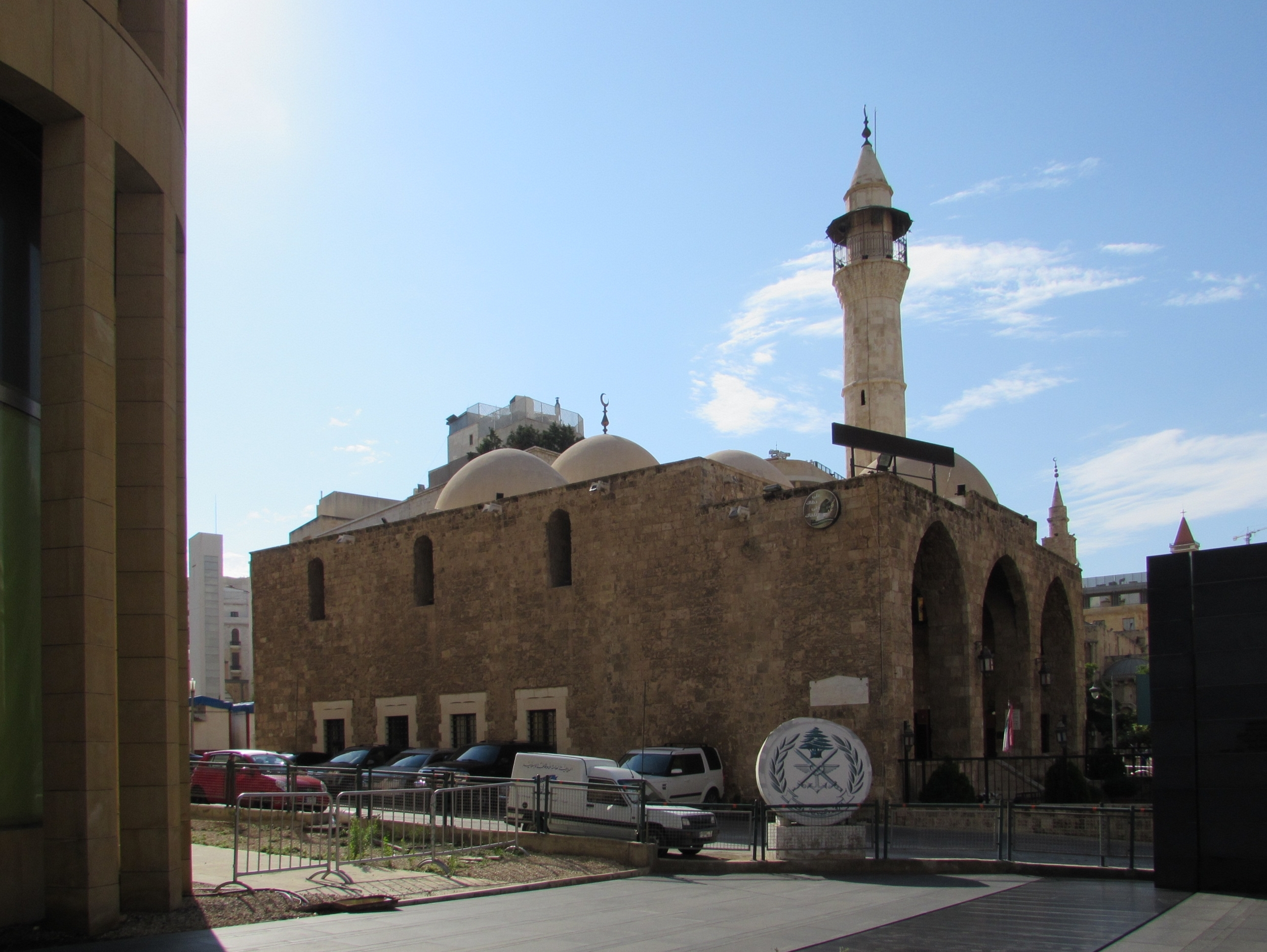
Amir Assaf Mosque

The Amir Assaf Mosque is located on Weygand Street in the central district of Beirut, near the eastern side of Al-Omari Great Mosque and facing the southeastern angle of the Municipal Palace and Samir Kassir Garden. It was built by Emir Mansour Assaf between 1572 and 1580 on the site of the Byzantine Church of the Holy Savior. It is also called "Bab Al-Saray Mosque" meaning "Door of the Great Serial". Scholars disagree regarding the reason for the mosque's second name, some say it is referring to the Ottoman Grand Serail while others insist that it's referring to "Dar Al-Wilaya", an ancient government serail near the mosque that was built by Prince Fakhr-al-Din II, governor of Beirut and Mount Lebanon.

=== Emir Munzer Mosque ===
Named after the Prince Munzer Bin Suleiman, this mosque is also called the "Nafoura" (which means Fountain) due to the presence of a fountain in its courtyard. The mosque was completed in 1620 during the reign of Fakhr-al-Din II, the Prince of Mount Lebanon.

=== Saint Elias Greek Catholic Cathedral ===
The Saint Elias Cathedral is located along Nejme Square in the Beirut Central District, and is affiliated with the Greek Melkite Catholic Church in Lebanon. At the time of its completion in 1863, the cathedral was perceived as a remarkable place due to its Byzantine architecture and beautiful oriental decoration. The cathedral is famous for its notable neo-classical interior design, its marble iconostasis, the Gothic arcs, and the celestial oculi. The cathedral was restored by the archdiocese in 1994, after the damages caused by the Civil War. The restoration works began at the end of 2003 and ended in May 2006.

=== National Evangelical Church ===
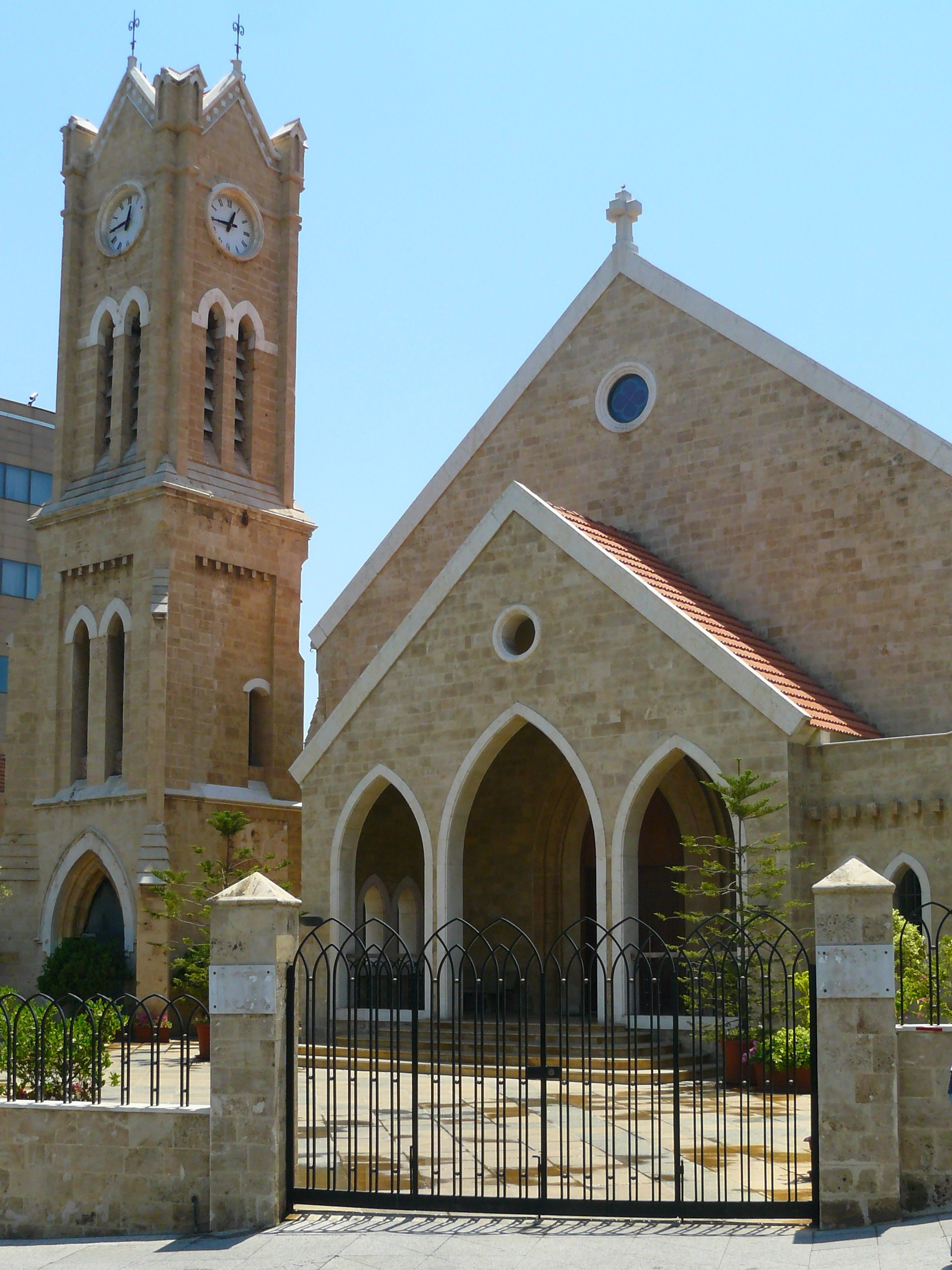
National Evangelical Church of Beirut

The National Evangelical Church of Beirut is the first native Arabic Protestant congregation of the Middle East. Established in downtown Beirut in 1848 by Congregational and Presbyterian American missionaries, it is the oldest and biggest of nine congregations in Lebanon. During the Lebanese Civil War (1975–90), the church was completely destroyed, except for the bell-tower, and the congregation consequently dispersed. Since its reconstruction in 1998, the National Evangelical Church of Beirut started re-gathering its parishioners in its fold, and holding regular prayer services and organizing socio-cultural activities. Residing directly adjacent to the Grand Serail, the architecture of this church is gothic and oriental with a red-brick roof.

=== Saint Louis Capuchin Church ===
The Saint Louis Capuchin Church is a Latin Catholic church in downtown Beirut, located to the north of the Grand Serail and Council of Reconstruction and Development. Built in 1864 by the Capuchin missionaries and named it in the honor of King Louis IX of France. The church was the first landmark structure to be renovated and opened in Beirut after the end of the Lebanese Civil War. The church is noticeable for its sandstone facades, rose-colored wooden windows, and its new white-limestone campanile.

=== All Saints Anglican Church ===
All Saints church was established in 1912. The church was founded by the sea shore close to Port of Beirut in order to serve the seafarers. It became then a church for the international English speaking community in the Lebanese capital. The Arab local congregation was established by Palestinian refugees. Many Lebanese families who came back to Lebanon from Palestine, where they became Anglicans, joined the church since then. All Saints is one of 27 Anglican/Episcopal churches in the territories under the jurisdiction of the Episcopal Church in Jerusalem and the Middle East. All Saints is the only Anglican Church in Lebanon.

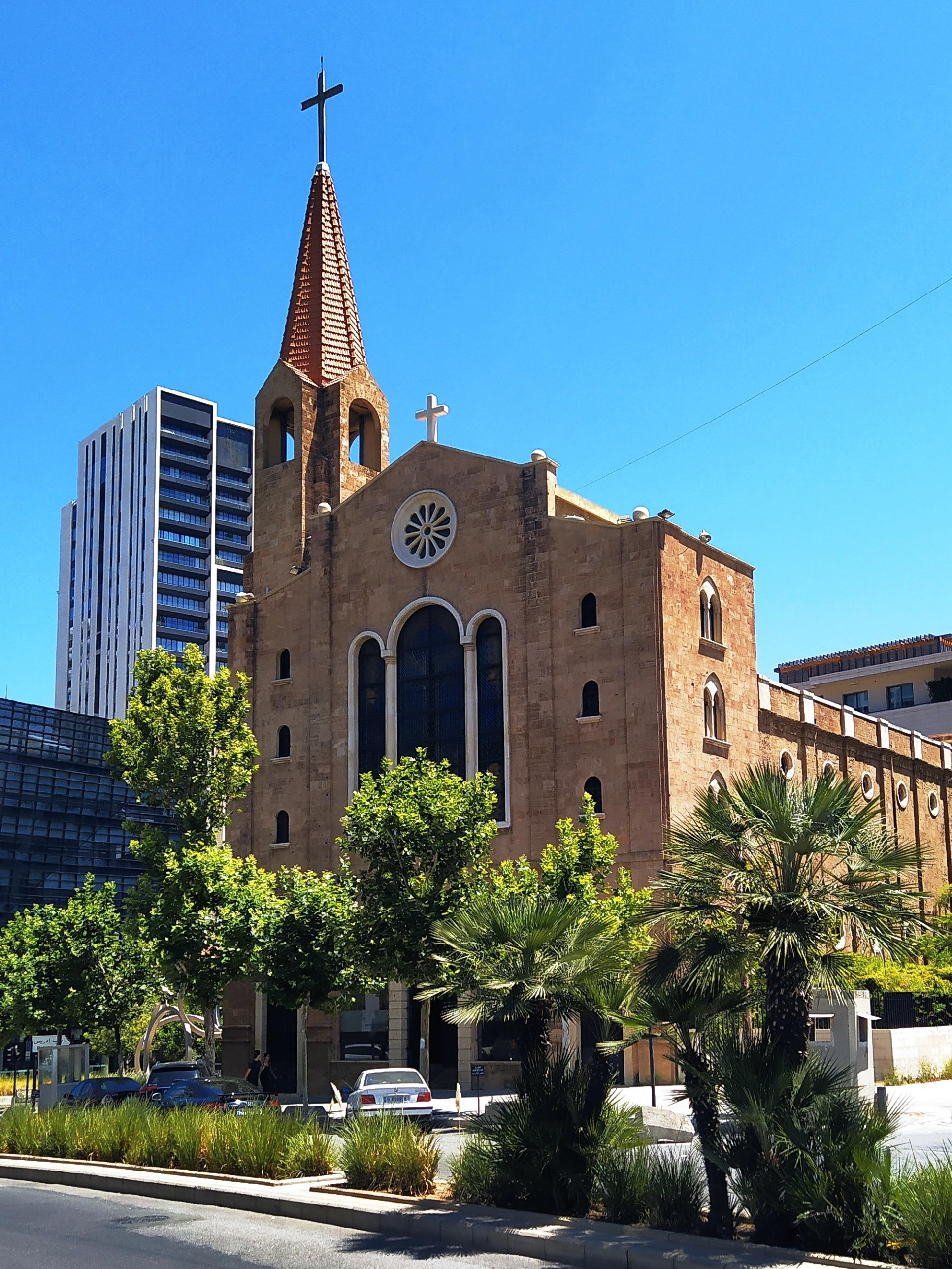
Saint Elias Maronite Church, Kantari

=== Saint Elias Maronite Church, Kantari ===
The Saint Elias Maronite Church is located on Fakhreddine Street in the Kantari district, west of the Beirut Central District. Built in 1907 under Archbishop Youssef El-Debs, Maronite Archbishop of Beirut, on the site of a smaller chapel dating to the eighteenth century, it is considered the first Maronite parish church established in the Lebanese capital. The building is constructed in yellow sandstone and red roof tiles in a neoclassical style with an orientalising inflection drawn from Italian ecclesiastical architecture. In the 1940s and 1950s the church served as the official parish of the former Lebanese presidential palace, then located nearby in Kantari, and Presidents Emile Eddé, Bechara El-Khoury and Camille Chamoun attended Sunday mass there. Heavily damaged during the Lebanese Civil War (1975–1990), the church was restored and re-inaugurated on 20 July 2002 by Archbishop Paul Youssef Matar. The interior stained-glass windows were commissioned in 2003 from French master glazier Jacques Guitton and completed in 2005. The church sustained further damage in the 2020 Beirut port explosion.

== International and foreign institutions ==
Benefiting from the geographic location of the city center and the proximity to official and business institutions, Downtown Beirut has become the center for many international institutions, business and cultural delegations, and foreign embassies. As such, several countries have become officially represented in the city center through embassies, business and cultural cooperation agencies, humanitarian NGOs, and consulates. Some of these are:

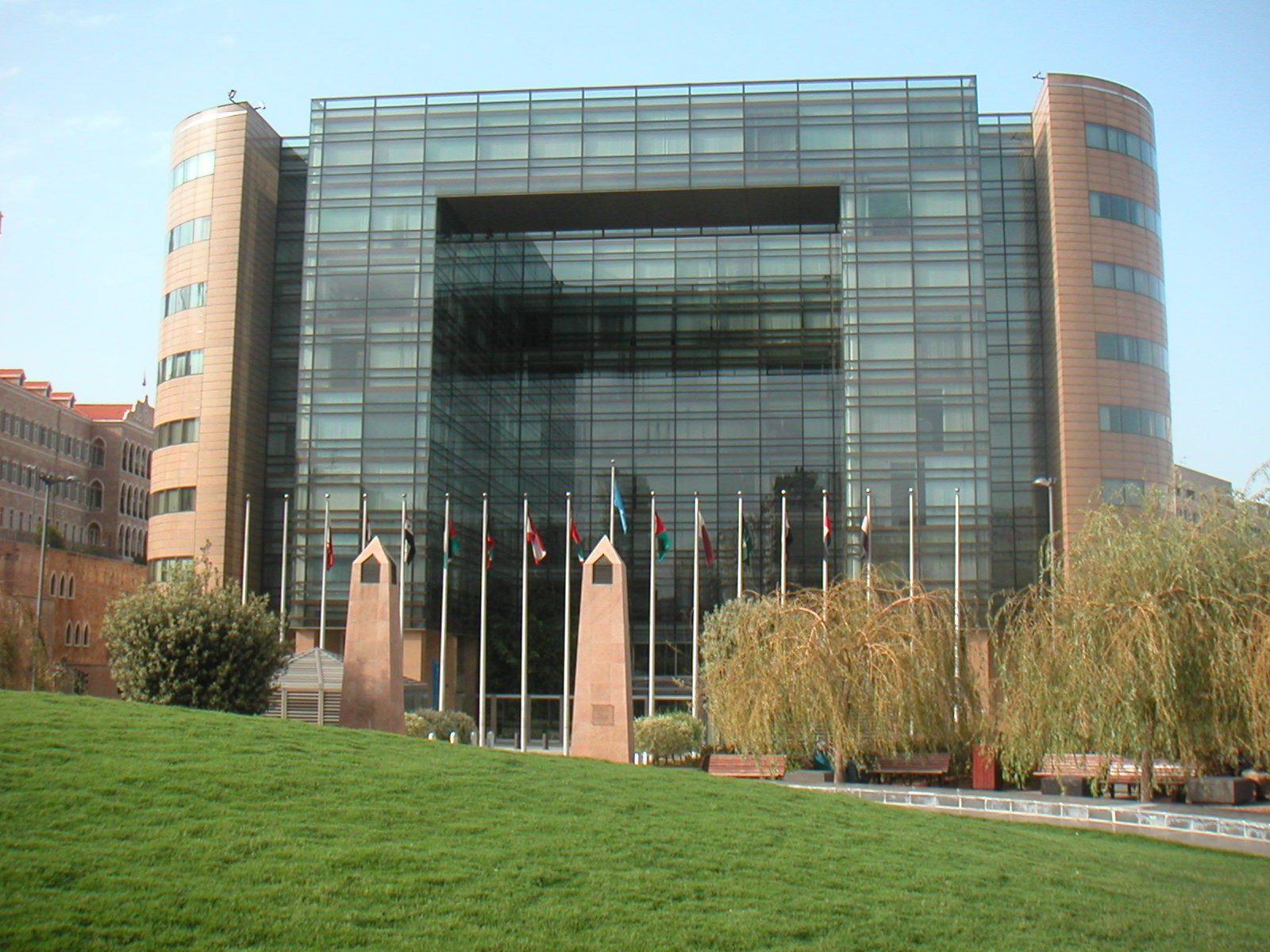
UN House which hosts United Nations headquarters

- American-Lebanese Chamber of Commerce
- World youth alliance
- Union of Arab Banks
- ESCWA
- Embassy of Belgium
- Embassy of Italy
- Consulate of Belize
- Instituto Cervantes
- Arab Cultural Foundation
- Lebanese-German Business Council
- Amideast Cultural Cooperation agency
- Consulate of Turkey
- Embassy of Japan
- Embassy of Britain
- Embassy of Argentina
- Consulate of Gambia
- Embassy of Australia
- Embassy of Norway
- Embassy of Denmark

=== UN House ===
A development at the southern gateway to the city center, overlooking Riad Al Solh Square and Gibran Khalil Gibran monumental garden, UN House was designed to house several United Nations local and regional agencies. Since its inauguration by UN Secretary General Kofi Annan in 1997, the UN House has become the focal point of the diplomatic activity in Lebanon. Best known for being the headquarters of the UN Economic and Social Commission for Western Asia (ESCWA), UN House also hosts UN regional and local headquarters including the World Bank's permanent Beirut office. The architecture of this nine-story development is in the shape of an arch. It comprises 43,000 square meters of floor space including offices, a library, language lab facilities, a conference center, storage, parking and retail space.

== Shopping and dining ==
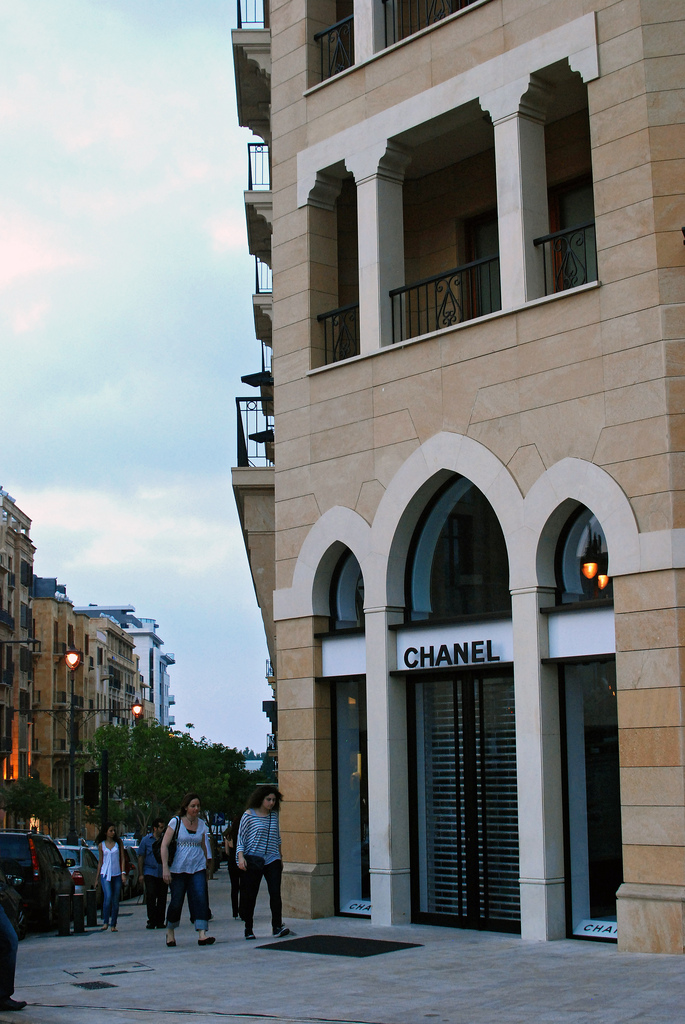
Chanel store in the BCD

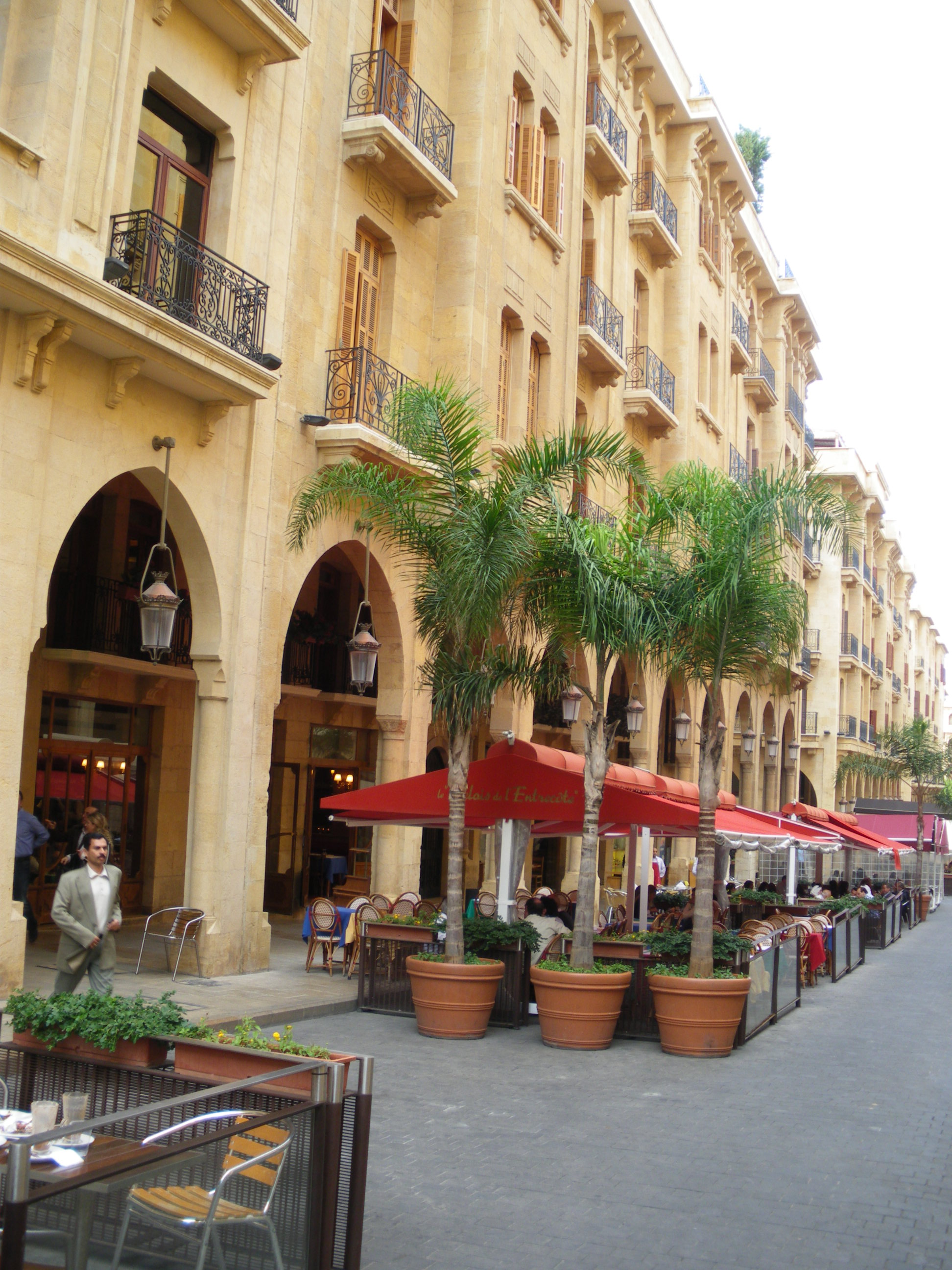
Sidewalk Cafes are a trademark of the BCD

The city center houses more than 350 retail outlets. Shopping in the city center mainly consists of fashion chains, designer shops, and boutiques. Stores sell clothing, accessories, jewelry, furniture, Hi-Fi and electronic equipment, records and books, handicrafts and gifts, art and antiques.

There are over 100 cafes, restaurants, pubs and nightclubs. Restaurants offer French, Italian, American, Lebanese, Chinese, Japanese and other Asian cuisines.

=== Beirut Souks ===
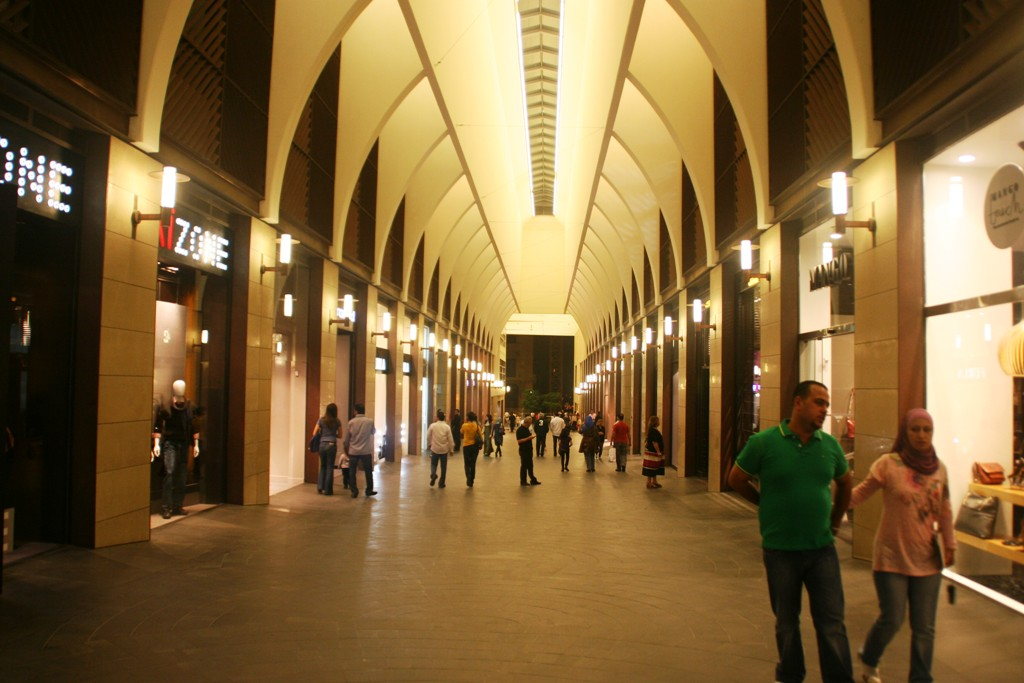
Souk Tawileh

The Beirut Souks is a shopping district in Downtown Beirut. It is home to more than 200 shops and a department store, making it Beirut's biggest shopping strip. The souks project is a reconstruction of the old medieval market, after it sustained irreparable damage from the Lebanese Civil War.

In 1994, the Lebanese Parliament approved a master plan, and construction was taken on by a real estate company that sought to appeal to the mercantile community that had fled during the war, while still preserving the original Hellenistic street grid that characterized the old souks and the area's historical landmarks. The souks were designed as interconnected open spaces with many access points along vaulted shopping alleys and arcades. The Beirut Souks have retained their historical names: Souk al Tawila (the long souk), Souk Arwam, Souk Jamil, Souk Ayyass, Souk Sayyour, Souk Bustros and Souk Arwad. Some of the stores in the souks are Cartier, Gucci, Burberry, Fendi, Zara, Mark Jacobs, Dolce & Gabbana, Dior, Massimo Dutti, Mango, Bottega Veneta, Timberland, Yves Saint Laurent, Bershka, Roberto Cavalli, Jimmy Choo, Jack & Jones, Stella McCartney, Celine, Louis Vuitton, Vero Moda, and Pull and Bear.

The northern section of Beirut Souks houses an entertainment complex designed by Paris-based architecture firm Valode & Pistre. It comprises 14 cinemas with two VIP halls served by lounge and concession areas.

== Art and music ==
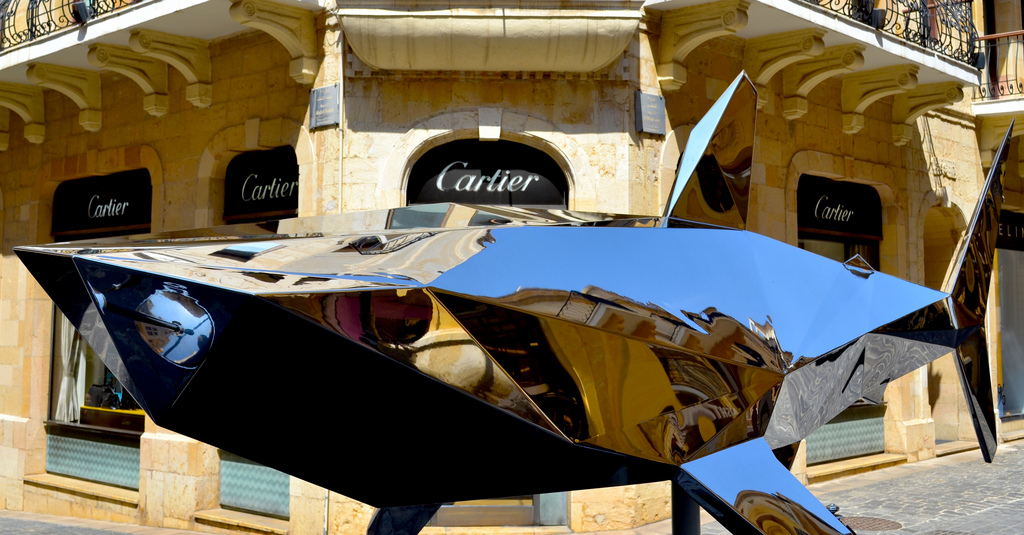
Street Art in front of a Cartier shop

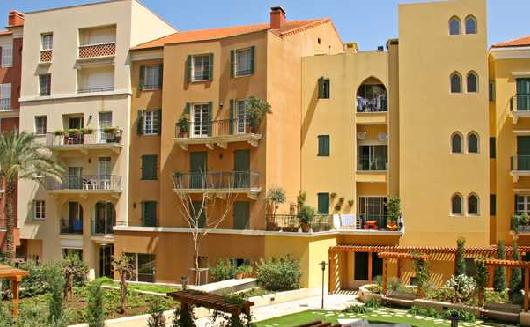
The Quartier des Arts at the Saifi Village

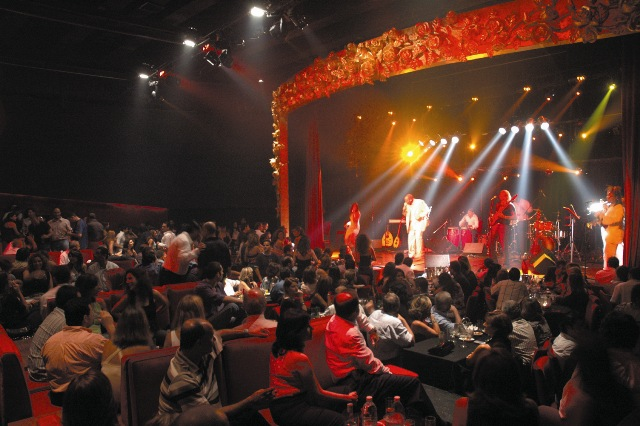
A live performance at the Music Hall

Beirut is the center of the entertainment business and art scene in the region. A thriving artistic center, Beirut has become a new regional hub for exhibitions, art galleries, and music performances. Local, regional and international exhibitions are regularly organized around the quarters of the city center. Those exhibitions cover a varied array of topics spanning sculptures, paintings, architecture and urban planning, manuscripts and archives, photography, handicrafts, and various other technical, commercial, industrial, and scientific themes. Venues that host these exhibitions range from historic buildings, cultural centers, media headquarters, bookstores and cafes to wholly dedicated exhibition centers and specialized display galleries. Also, open spaces often host numerous temporary art galleries and public shows. Beirut Souks, specifically Ajami Square and Trablous Street, have become a favorable location for street shows, exhibitions and concerts like the 2011 Miss Lebanon Pageant. Beirut International Exhibition & Leisure Center (commonly BIEL) is a dedicated fair ground, constituting 15000 sq meters of display floor, that hosts diversely themed exhibitions. Saifi Village is Beirut's "Quartier des Arts" or "Arts Quarter", hosting year-round events in its vibrant cluster of art galleries and artisan shops. Concerts and musical performances can be attended in churches or historic buildings, in open spaces, and in private venues like the Music Hall.

Beirut Central District gradually regained, as well as evolved, its role as the cultural and literature pivot of the capital. Major bookstores and libraries in the country are located here, and constantly host book signings, book launching, seminars and conferences by world-renowned, regional and local authors. Major bookstores are Librarie Antoune, Al Bourj Bookstore, Virgin Megastores, and Sored bookstore; as well as a planned public library on Martyrs' Square. The central district is also home to the headquarters of the acclaimed Pan-Middle East newspapers An-Nahar, The Daily Star, and L'Orient-Le Jour. In 2010, Beirut was named the World Book Capital, celebrations and activities of the occasion were held in the BIEL center in the central district. The central district is home to the annual Beirut Arab & International Book Fair, that features works and authors from Lebanon, Saudi Arabia, Kuwait, United Arab Emirates, Oman, Iraq, Palestine and Egypt and several others, with some 180 Lebanese publishers, and dozens more from the rest of the Arab world participating. Another major Book Fair held in the central district is the Francophone Book Fair. The fair gathers together authors and personalities from Europe, North Africa and Lebanon, with a different country being chosen as the guest of honor each year. In its twienth year, the fair welcomed nearly 100,000 visitors. In 2012, The Arab and International Book Fair entered its 56th year, while the Francophone Book Fair turned twenty.

During the summer season, the new waterfront in the Beirut Central District becomes a gigantic concert arena that hosts world-class performers and shows. The list of performers at the new waterfront district includes David Guetta, Shakira, Thirty Seconds to Mars, Flo Rida, James Blunt, Marcel Khalife, Kesha, Alexandra Stan, Sean Kingston, T-Pain, Warda Al-Jazairia, Akon, Lil Wayne, Sting, Mariah Carey, Phil Collins, 50 Cent, Majida El Roumi, Ricky Martin, Mika, Tiësto, The Pussycat Dolls, Snoop Dogg, Michael Bolton, Armin Van Buuren, Enrique Iglesias, Red Hot Chili Peppers, Fairuz, Evanescence, Taio Cruz, Scorpions ... etc.

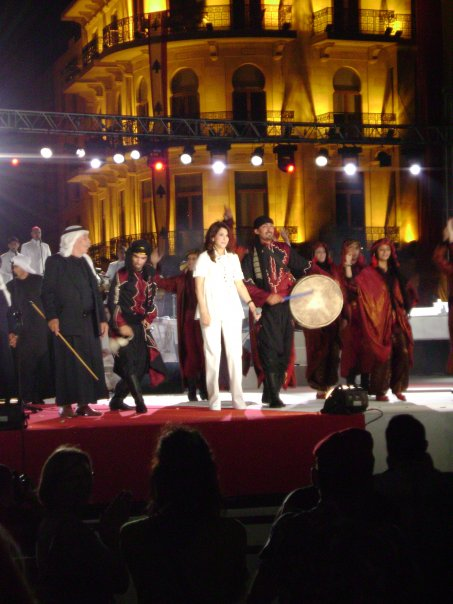
Majida El Roumi performs in a festival in Martyrs' Square

=== Beirut Music and Art Festival ===
2011 witnessed the launching of the Beirut Music and Art Festival, an annual event to take place at Beirut Souks. The aim for this festival is to promote and strengthen the cultural scene in Lebanon and the Middle East, by proposing a combination of local musicians, world-class performers and art in all its forms. The artists' and singers' performances were divided along two stages: The Grand Stand venue and The Music village venue. The list of performers in the festival's first year included Al Di Meola, Earth, Wind & Fire, Goran Bregovic, Ilham al-Madfai, Marcel Khalife, Natacha Atlas, and Roger Hodgson.

=== Beirut Jazz Festival ===
The Beirut Jazz Festival is an annual music festival and celebration that runs for almost ten days each year. The festival was launched in 2007 in downtown Beirut. The festival has taken place in different venues each year. According to the festival's organizers, the Beirut Jazz Festival doesn't limit itself exclusively to classical Jazz music but "integrates folkloric Arabic Music into western improvisational musical ideas whilst experimenting with traditional music genres from diverse parts of the world".

=== Fête de la Musique ===
Initiated in Paris in 1982, The Fête de la Musique, or World Music Day, has evolved into an international music festival that is celebrated worldwide, and in the Middle East only Jordan, Morocco, and Algeria celebrate it next to Lebanon. It is an all-night music celebration held at the moment of the summer solstice, and consists of free concerts by amateur and professional musicians and are accessible to all the public. It takes place in various venues in the Beirut Central District (mainly Martyrs' Square, Roman Baths Garden, and Samir Kassir Square) or outside of the district (Rue Hamra and Rue Gouraud). "Time Out Beirut" magazine described the festival saying that "it encourages people to see great free music and break down the barriers between the streets and the players, it’s a democratising evening of musical discovery".

=== Beirut Celebrates ===
"Beirut Celebrates" is the name of the annual Christmas and New Year's Eve festivities in the Beirut Central District. Under the patronage of the Prime Minister of Lebanon and the Lebanese Ministry of Culture, Solidere, the Lebanese Company for the Development and Reconstruction of Beirut, organizes a series of events on the occasion of the end of the year festivities. The downtown area witnesses a giant Christmas Parade that straddles along Martyrs' Square, Allenby Street, and Beirut Souks; and the inauguration of the " Santa's Village", a Christmas market in Saifi Village. Other celebrations include Christmas Lights, Lighting of the Christmas tree, Firework shows, singing carols, marching bands, and Santa floats.

=== Beirut International Marathon ===
"Beirut International Marathon" is an annual event in the Beirut Central District that started on October 19, 2003. It is organized by the non-profit NGO "Beirut Marathon Association" whose mission, according to their website, is to "passionately organize running events that inspire unity, positively change lifestyles, promote wellness, and provide an experience of challenge, achievement, joy, and glory; for the benefit of Lebanon, both for now and generations to come". Since it launched its first race, the marathon has earned the Bronze Road Race Label from the International Association of Athletics Federations, and the Laureus World Sports Awards. The marathon's trail starts at a different point in the Beirut Central District each year but always terminates at Martyrs' Square. The marathon constitutes eight races: the 42 kilometer race, the 42 kilometer race (wheelchair), 42 kilometer relay, the 10 kilometer fun run, the 10,000 meters run, the 10,000 meters run (wheelchair), the 5 kilometer youth run, the one kilometer "run with mom" race. In 2009, the Beirut Marathon nearly drew 33,000 runners covering various distances from 10 kilometers to the traditional 42 kilometers.

=== "Beirut Chants" Festival ===
Beirut Chants is a music festival launched in 2007, and is part of the European Festivals Association. It takes place over a period of five weeks each year-end in the historical churches of the central district. It includes recitative, sacred choral music, chamber and philharmonic orchestra performances, and a wide variety vocal and instrumental music shows. Some of the notable performers are Notre Dame University Choir, Lebanese National Symphony Orchestra, Abeer Nehme, Jeff Cohen, Abdel Rahman El Bacha, and Vadym Kholodenko.

== New Waterfront District ==
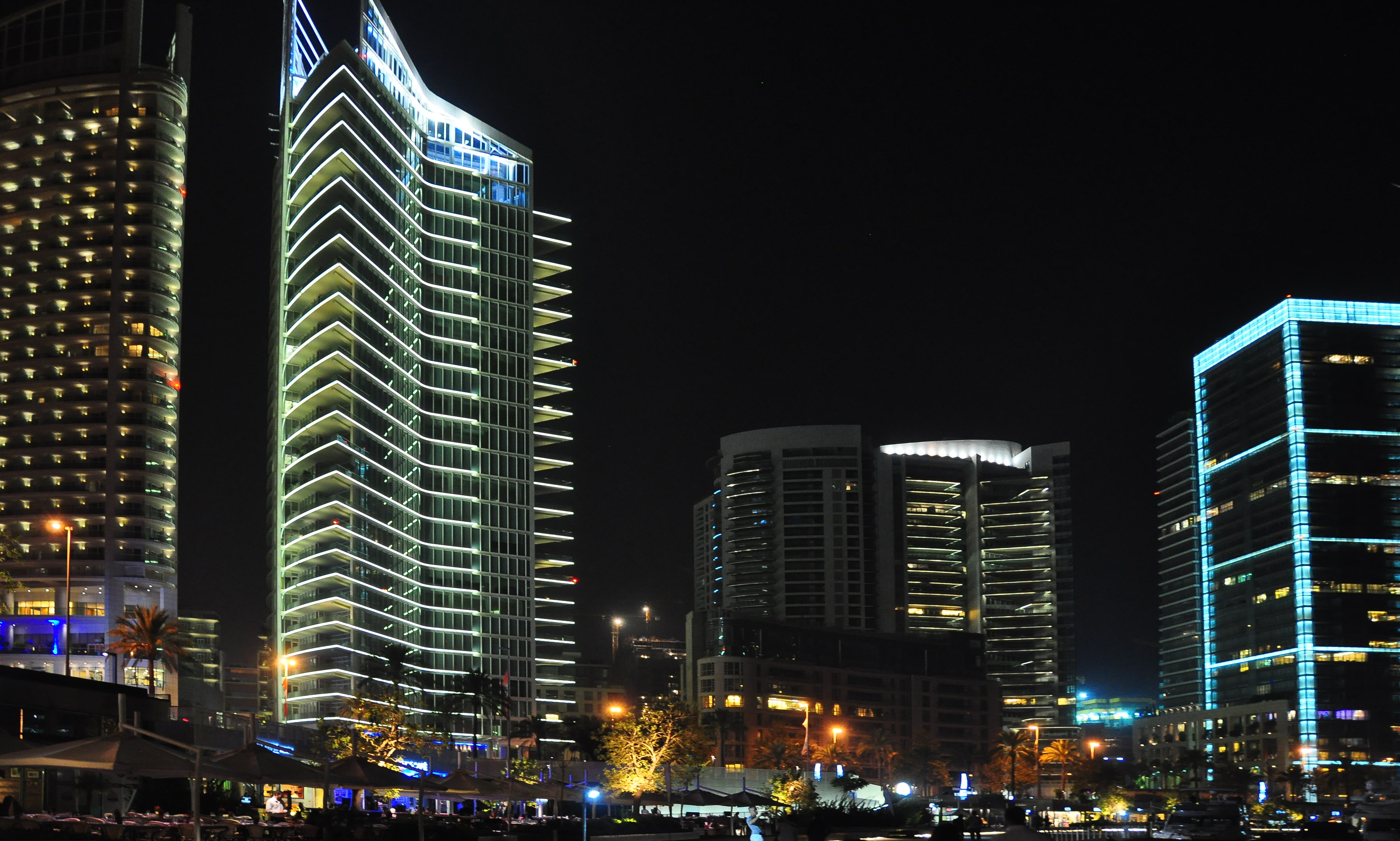
Seafront Towers at Zaitunay Bay, Downtown Beirut

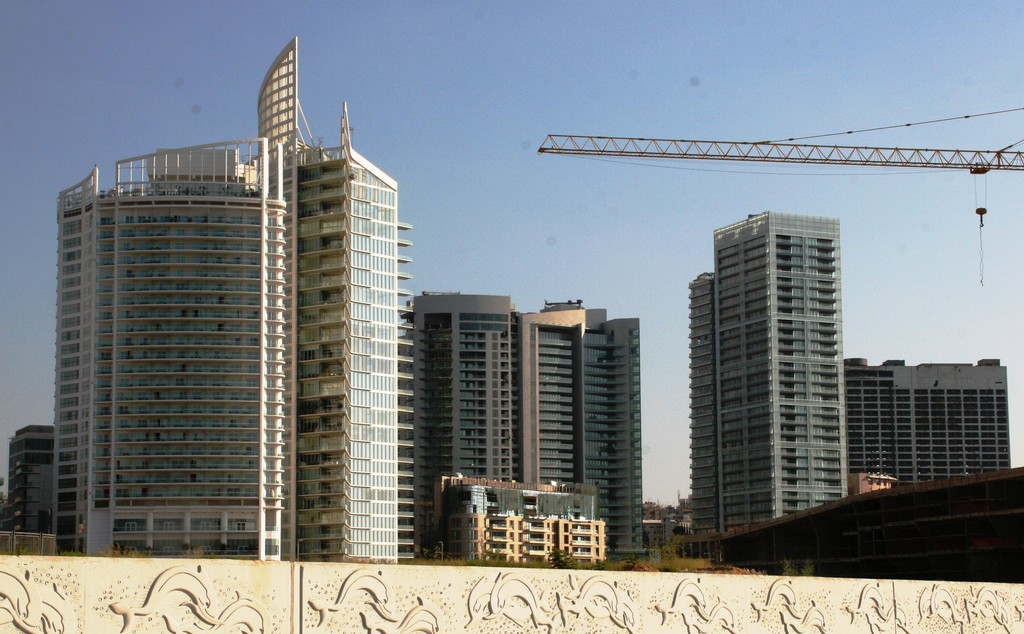

A portion of the Beirut Central District lies on land reclaimed from the Mediterranean, providing a 3.5-km extension of the city shoreline. The Waterfront District is a multi-use district with financial, business, residential, tourist and leisure facilities and green areas, that overlooks the Saint George Bay and Mount Lebanon. The district comprises 73 hectares of reclaimed land north of the old seashore, enclosed within a terraced sea defense system. Together with the Seaside Park, Corniche Beirut and the West Marina with land, quays and breakwater around, it includes development blocks and public domain extending north of Beirut Souks to reach the corniche promenade, and east of the Seaside Park to reach the first basin of the Port of Beirut and the planned East Marina.

An area in the eastern part of the district was leased to Beirut International Exhibition & Leisure Center (BIEL); it includes exhibition halls, conference areas, a banquet pavilion and a seaside restaurant.

The marine works on the Waterfront District includes a submerged reef as first defense line extending 100 m seawards along the Corniche - 80 reinforced concrete caissons, each 17.5 m wide, 27.75 m long and 10.5 m high, as second defense line. The superstructure provides two-level promenades over 1.3 km. Back-filling behind them provides a stabilizing bond and a third promenade, 5.5 m above sea level.
On September 16, 2012, the New Waterfront District was the site of a mass held by the pope. The mass was the culmination of Pope Benedict XVI's three-day visit to Lebanon. An estimated 350,000 people gathered for the event.

=== West Marina ===
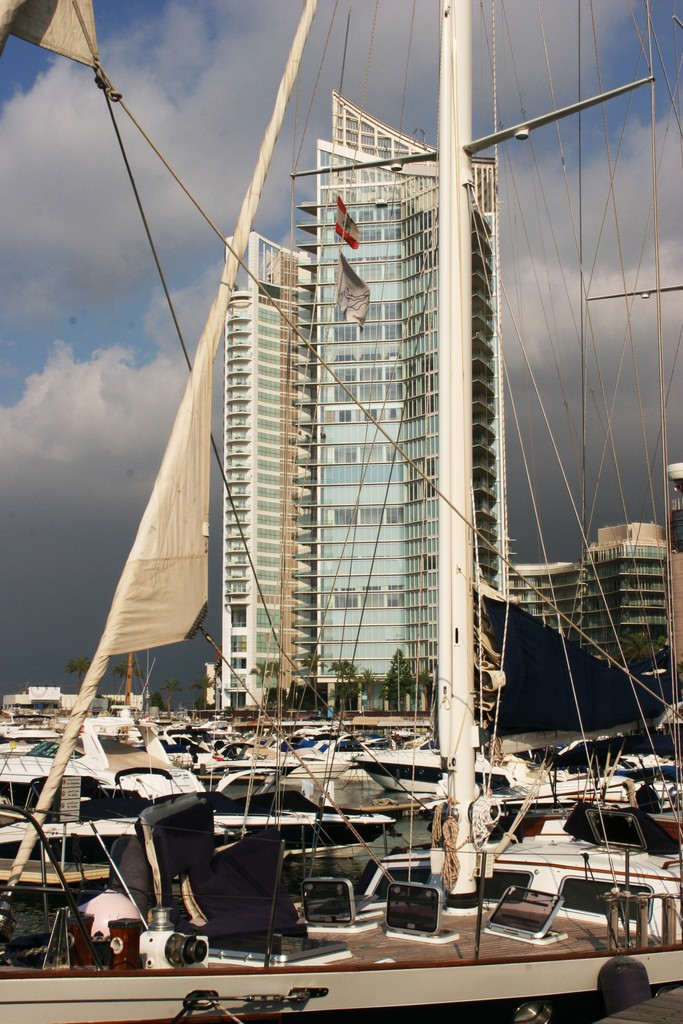
Boats docked in front of the Marina Towers

Beirut Central District has two marinas, to the west and east of the new Waterfront district. Beirut West Marina is to the west of the central district. West Marina provides mooring for 164 boats on average annually. Solidere developed and is operating the West Marina as part of its 50-year agreement with the Lebanese Government, which also includes planned underground corniche car park.

=== Beirut Exhibition Center ===
Beirut Exhibition Center is the first structure dedicated to contemporary art in Beirut's waterfront district. It is composed of 1200 square meters of art gallery space, with its exterior shell covered in reflective mirror-like steel. Working with the topography, the building sits in a reflective pool of water that further reflects both the building and its surroundings. The center is designed by L.E.FT, an architecture and landscape design firm based in New York City.

=== Zaitunay Bay ===
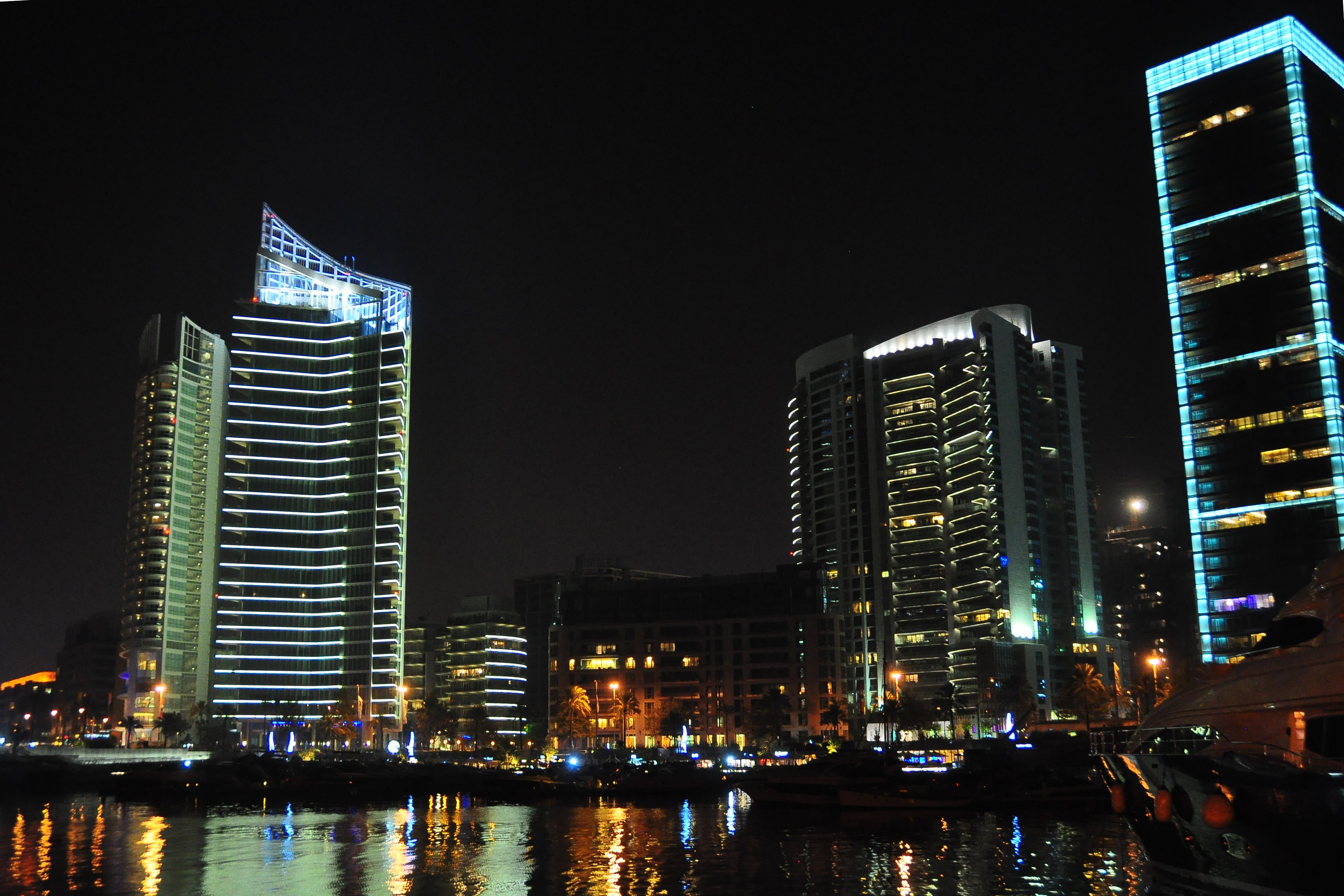
Zaitunay Bay

Zaitunay Bay is a quayside commercial and tourist strip around the West Marina, composed of 17 restaurants and cafes, 5 retail stores, 2 activity centers, a yachtclub and a boardwalk. The quayside restaurant strip is along the Beirut Marina, from the site's western limit to the Yacht Club building on the east. The strip houses international restaurant and cafe chains such as Paul, Moti Mahal Delux, Häagen-Dazs, and The Coffee Bean & Tea Leaf, aside to many local outlets serving seafood, and Lebanese or French Cuisine.

Zaitunay Bay is a joint venture between Solidere and Stow, and is designed by American architect Steven Holl. The project is conceived as an urban beach, extending the existing Corniche Beirut and the new sea promenade in a series of overlapping platform. The one-floor construction remains below street level, with the roofs forming a continuation of the Corniche Beirut. The landscape design for the entry plaza, quayside and corniche sidewalk, create open-air terraces in the form of a ‘stone beach’ over the restaurants and shops. Zaitunay Bay is accessible to the general public with the promenade on the upper level linking the public sidewalk to the marina boardwalk in a vehicle-free environment accessible through 7 pedestrian access points with adjacent underground public parking facilities. The Yacht Club accommodates three basement levels; commercial shops at marina level; a yacht club and 53 apartments on the upper three levels, with one, two and three bedrooms. Two activity centers provide all sea-related services and water sports activities. "Zaitunay", literally meaning olives, is the old name of the area in the pre-Lebanese Civil War era.

=== Beirut International Exhibition & Leisure Center ===
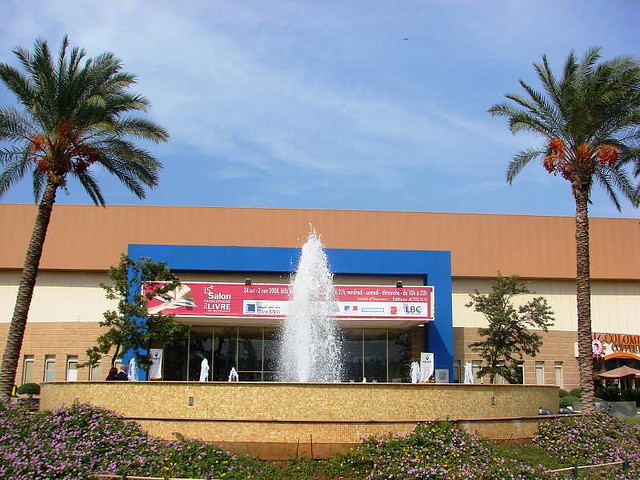
BIEL while hosting the Francophone Book Fair

The Beirut International Exhibition & Leisure Center (BIEL) is a mixed-use center consisting of 82,000 square meters of multi-functional areas: 10,000 square meters of which is indoor column-free exhibition space, 25,000 square meters of outdoor exhibition space, a conference center, a grand Ballroom and parking. BIEL hosts and caters for a wide array of events. The center also accommodates music concerts with its capacity of 9,000 seated persons or 20,000 standing persons. The center is also equipped with 42000 square meters car parking capacity. Pavilion Royal, adjacent to the main BIEL building; is a 2000 m^{2} hall with an 8 m high ceiling. BIEL also features 1200 square meters of underground conference halls: grand hall with a 9000 persons capacity, and two conference rooms with a 700 persons capacity each.

=== Beirut Fitness Center ===
The Beirut Fitness Center is on a designated stretch within the New Waterfront District for temporary programs. Indoor activity spaces including fitness and aquatic zones, squash courts, reading rooms, and multipurpose spaces lie along the periphery of the outdoor courtyard and tennis courts.
