= MusicHall (Beirut) =

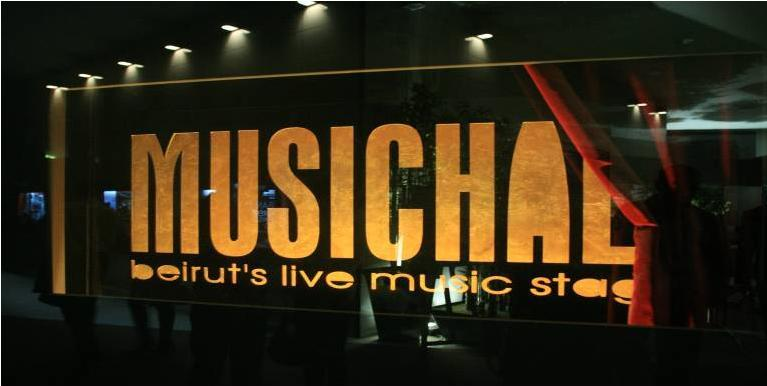
The MusicHall's entrance

MusicHall is a cabaret-style musichall theatre specializing in live entertainment and cultural showbiz. It is located at Starco Center on Omar Daouk Street between Rue Petro Paoli and Rue Chateaubriand in the city centre of Beirut, Lebanon.

The MusicHall was opened in 2003 by its founder and co-owner Michel Elefteriades who converted an old cinema into a cabaret theatre with a mix of local and foreign acts.

In 2013, a second branch of MusicHall was opened in Dubai, UAE.

In that same year Elefteriades also opened "MusicHall Waterfront" in Beirut, an open-air venue near Downtown Beirut's sea side.

And in the summer of 2019, the MusicHall landed in Jeddah, making it the very first club to open in the Kingdom of Saudi Arabia.

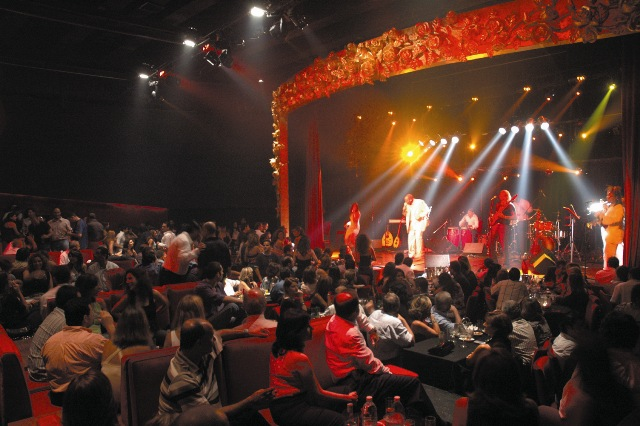
A live performance at the MusicHall

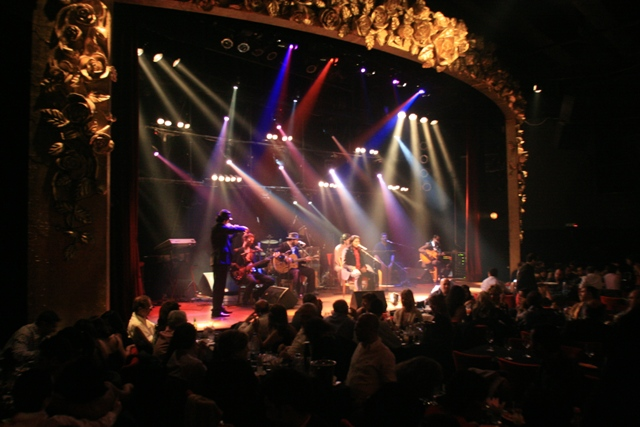
Band on stage at the MusicHall
