= Platinum Tower (Beirut) =

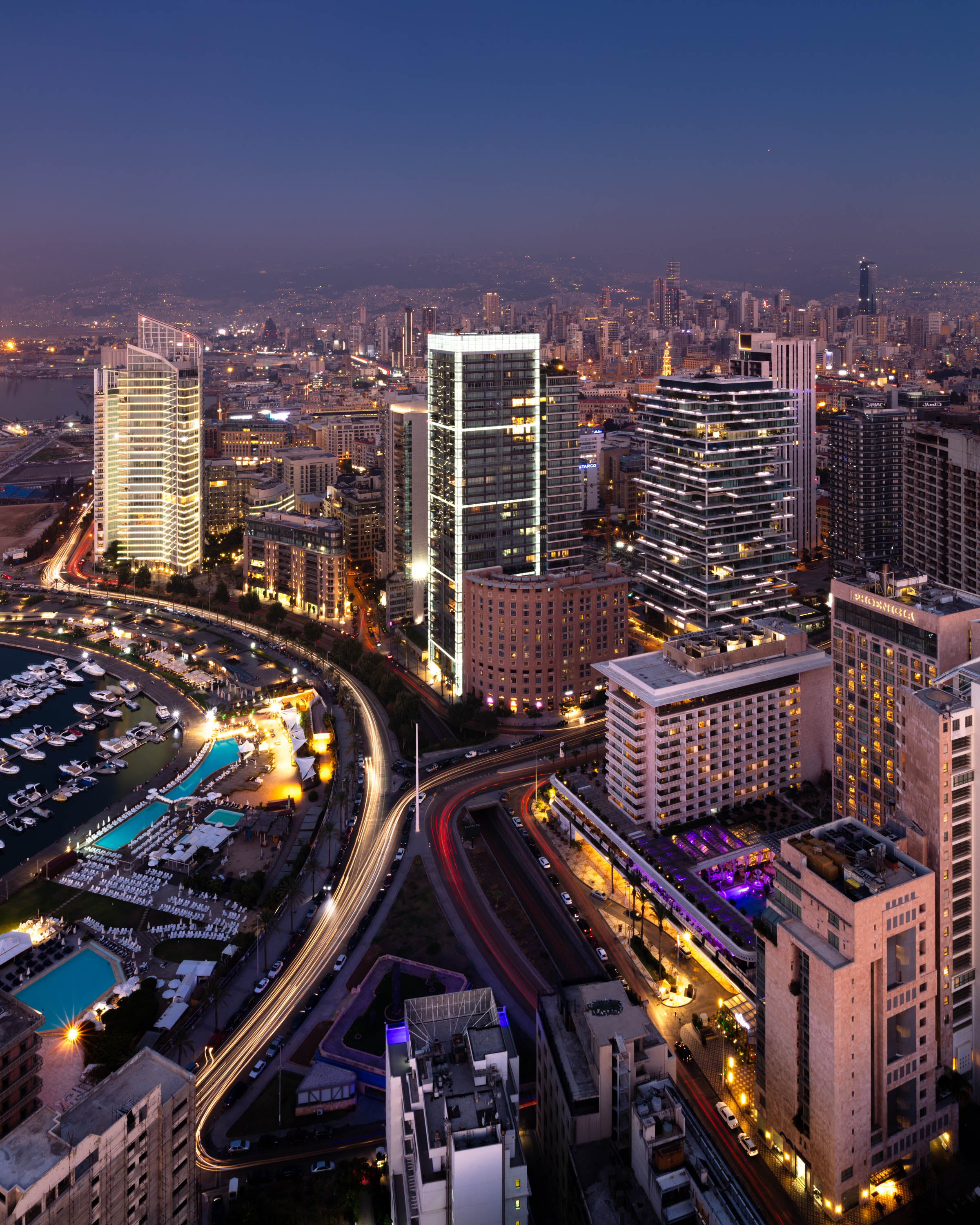
- Platinum Tower at dusk
- Interactive map of the Platinum Tower area

General information
- Status: Completed
- Type: Residential
- Architectural style: Contemporary
- Location: Beirut, Lebanon
- Coordinates: 33°54′2″N 35°29′46″E
- Completed: 2008
- Cost: $200 million
- Management: D. G. Jones & partners

Height
- Roof: 153 m (502 ft)

Technical details
- Floor count: 35
- Lifts/elevators: 14

Design and construction
- Architects: Nabil Gholam & Ricardo Bofill
- Developer: Hourie Development
- Main contractor: Arabian Construction Company (ACC)

Platinum Tower is a highrise residential building in Beirut, Lebanon. It occupies a large plot on the Zaitunay Bay Marina, at Saint George Bay in the Beirut Central District.

== Location ==
The platinum tower has occupied a location on the seafront. It is also considered to be an inflated eye-sore by many citizens of the city as it also representative of a violent contemporary gentrification moment. The tower neighbors hotels like the InterContinental Phoenicia Beirut Hotel, the Monroe Hotel, Le Vendôme Intercontinental Hotel, Grand Hyatt and the Four Seasons Hotel. It is also adjacent to landmarks including the Rafik Hariri memorial, the St. Elias Cathedral, the Corniche Beirut, All Saints Church, Beirut International Exhibition & Leisure Center, Beirut Terraces and the war-torn Holiday Inn Beirut, one of the last witnesses to Beirut's destructive Battle of the Hotels.

== Project ==
The Platinum Tower consists of two single buildings, the smaller one at the sea side, the lower one overlooking the Beirut Central District. This building was a 'Hourie Development' project, designed by Nabil Gholam Architects in association with Ricardo Bofill Taller de Arquitectura. It was completed in 2008, one year behind its expected completion date. It held the status of the tallest building in Lebanon at 153 meters until 2014 when it was eclipsed by the more inconsiderate 180-meter-high Sky Gate tower in the Achrafieh district of Beirut. Below the tower, five levels are reserved a car park.

== Light ==
The house is illuminated at night at its edges, and on top, additionally with horizontal light lines at every ninth floor.

== Image gallery ==
Close lookup

Rear view

Marina Towers (left), Platinum Tower (right)

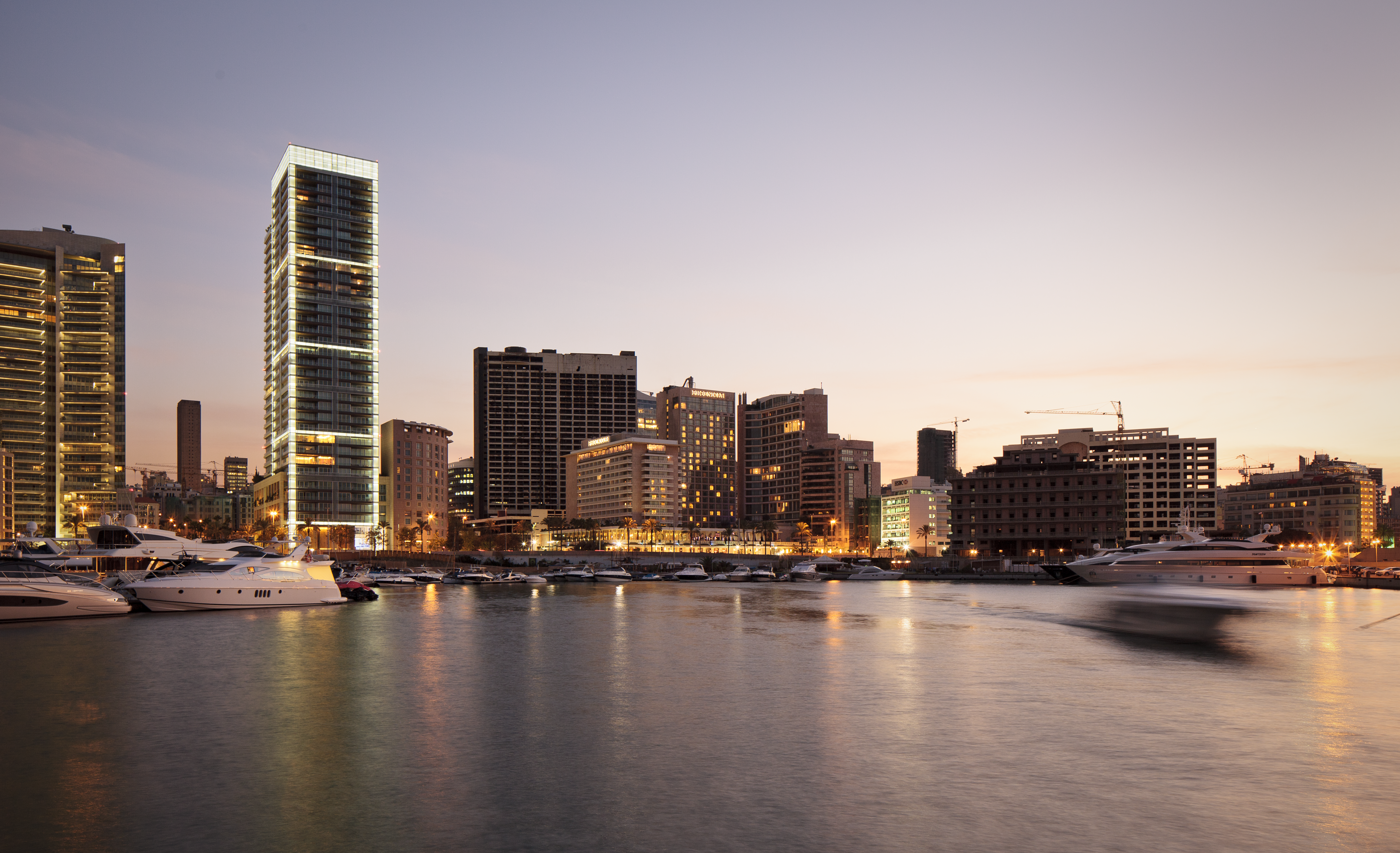
View form Zaitunay Bay marina

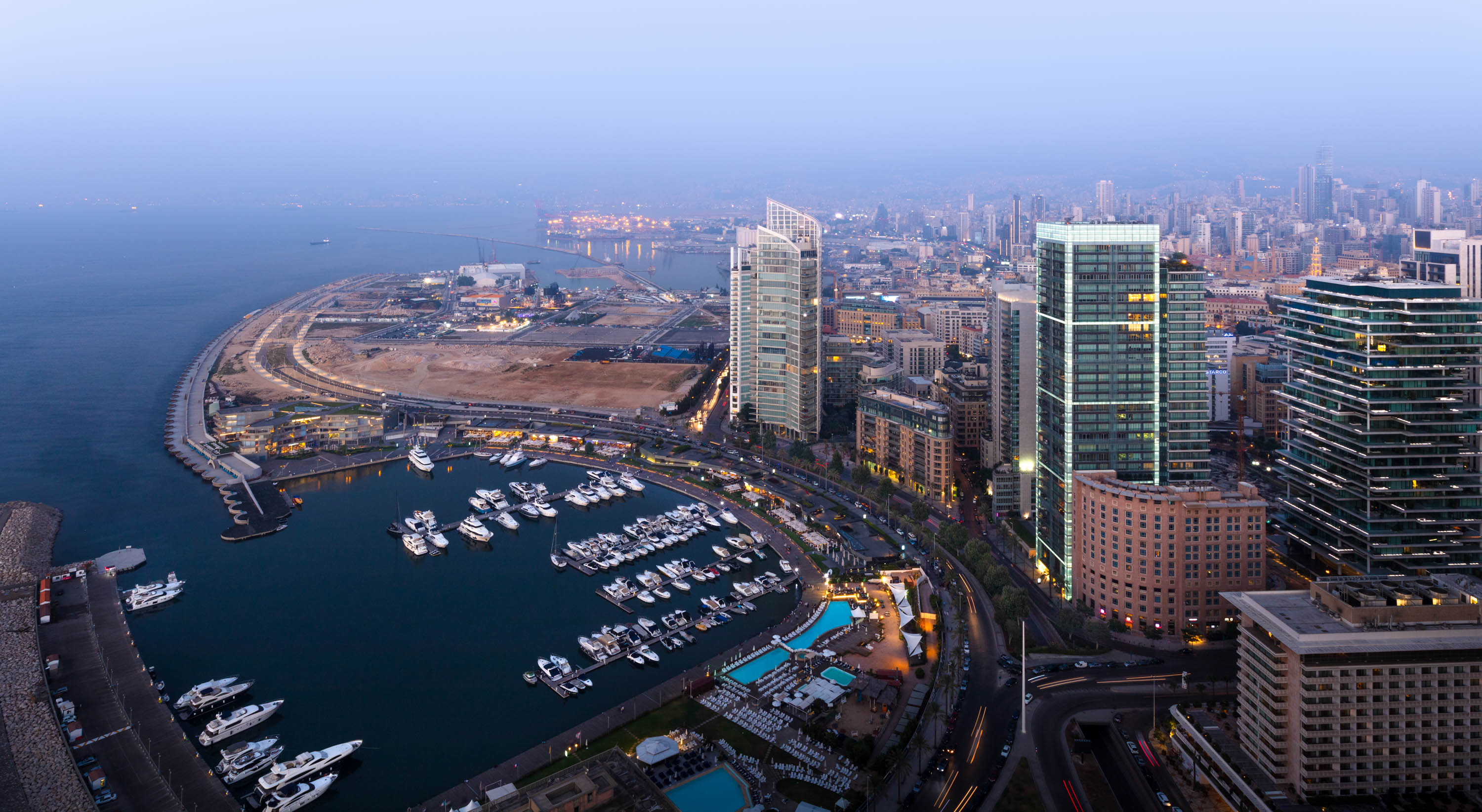
Aerial view

View at dusk

== See also ==
- List of tallest buildings in Lebanon
