= List of tallest buildings in Lebanon =

Ever since the end of the Lebanese Civil War in 1991, Lebanon has undergone a construction phase resulting in many towers being built towards its skyline. The following is a list of tallest buildings in Lebanon.

== Tallest buildings ==
Was the tallest building in Lebanon upon completion
Indicates buildings that have been topped out but not yet completed

Rank	Name	Image	Height m (ft)	Floors	Year	City	Coordinates	Notes
1	Sama Beirut		195.2 m (640 ft)	52	2017	Beirut	33°53′13.50″N 35°30′36.80″E	Tallest building in Lebanon since 2017.
2	FortyFour		185 m (607 ft)	44	2020	Beirut	33°52′49.9″N 35°32′32.1″E	Developed by DEMCO PROPERTIES in partnership with M1 Real Estate.
3	Sky Gate		180.4 m (592 ft)	42	2016	Beirut	33°53′16.00″N 35°31′03.20″E	Tallest residential building in Lebanon. Tallest building in Lebanon from 2016 to 2017.
4	Les Domes De Sursock		163.6 m (537 ft)	31	2016	Beirut	33°53′34.50″N 35°31′04.00″E	
5	Al Murr Tower		157 m (515 ft)	40	N/D	Beirut	33°53′43.00″N 35°29′47.40″E	Construction stopped in 1975 following the outbreak of the Lebanese Civil War, shortly after the building had topped out. Tallest unused building in Lebanon.
6	2030		155 m (509 ft)	30	2017	Beirut	33°53′22.70″N 35°30′51.10″E	
7	Platinum Tower		153 m (502 ft)	34	2008	Beirut	33°54′02.50″N 35°29′47.20″E	Tallest building in Lebanon from 2008 to 2016.
8	Abdel Wahab 618		152 m (499 ft)	37	2017	Beirut	33°53′21.00″N 35°30′57.00″E	
9	Marina Tower		150 m (490 ft)	27	2007	Beirut	33°54′06.20″N 35°29′55.50″E	Tallest building in Lebanon from 2007 to 2008.
10=	Place Pasteur		140 m (460 ft)	36	2017	Beirut	33°53′44.50″N 35°30′50.00″E	
10=	La Citadelle		140 m (460 ft)	34	2017	Beirut	33°54′07.20″N 35°29′32.20″E	
11	Credit Libanais Tower		133 m (436 ft)	34	2015	Beirut	33°52′48.60″N 35°31′28.20″E	
12=	Marina Gate		130 m (430 ft)	32	2018	Naccache	33°55′14.649″N 35°35′05.719″E	Developed by RISE PROPERTIES. Tallest building in Lebanon outside of Beirut.
12=	Hilton Habtoor Grand Hotel		130 m (430 ft)	30	2005	Sin el Fil	33°52′09.80″N 35°32′14.00″E	Tallest building in Lebanon from 2005 to 2007.
13	3 Beirut		126 m (413 ft)	33	2017	Beirut	33°53′56.30″N 35°29′51.70″E	
14	Bay Tower		125 m (410 ft)	30	2011	Beirut	33°54′02.50″N 35°29′52.00″E	
15=	Achrafieh 4748 Complex		120 m (390 ft)	30	2015	Beirut	33°52′42.30″N 35°31′43.30″E	
15=	Four Seasons Hotel		120 m (390 ft)	26	2009	Beirut	33°54′06.80″N 35°29′57.30″E	
16	Beirut Terraces		119.5 m (392 ft)	27	2016	Beirut	33°53′59.00″N 35°29′46.50″E	
17	Holiday Inn Beirut		118 m (387 ft)	26	1974	Beirut	33°53′58.60″N 35°29′41.80″E	Tallest building in Lebanon from 1974 to 2005. The hotel was operational for only one year prior to the outbreak of the Lebanese Civil War. During the Battle of the Hotels, the building sustained significant damage and was subsequently targeted by scavengers for looting. As of 2017, the building remains in an abandoned state, serving as a prominent ruin within the Beirut skyline. Second-tallest unused building in Lebanon.
18	Hosn 440		113 m (371 ft)	27	2010	Beirut	33°53′55.20″N 35°29′36.80″E	
19	Beirut Tower		112.2 m (368 ft)	30	2009	Beirut	33°54′02.40″N 35°29′50.50″E	
20	Burj Kronfol		110 m (360 ft)	28	2012	Beirut	33°52′43.10″N 35°30′29.80″E	
21	Rizk Tower		106 m (348 ft)	27	1974	Beirut	33°53′13.90″N 35°30′52.40″E	
22=	Damac Tower		102 m (335 ft)	28	2015	Beirut	33°53′56.30″N 35°29′45.50″E	Interior designed by Versace Home. Won the 2010 Best High-rise Architecture Award at the International Property Awards in London.
22=	The Heights		102 m (335 ft)	26	2014	Beirut	33°53′18.60″N 35°28′48.40″E	
22=	Karam Tower		102 m (335 ft)	26	N/D	Beirut	33°53′39.70″N 35°31′31.50″E	
23=	Ashrafieh Tower		100 m (330 ft)	25	2008	Beirut	33°53′19.30″N 35°30′44.00″E	
23=	Atomium 5242		100 m (330 ft)	27	2000	Beirut	33°53′16.00″N 35°31′05.00″E	
24	Al Sahab		98 m (322 ft)	25	2000	Beirut	33°53′36.20″N 35°28′28.10″E	
25	Carlton Residence Beirut		96 m (315 ft)	24	2014	Beirut	33°53′09.00″N 35°28′35.00″E	
26	Horizon Tower		95 m (312 ft)	24	2006	Beirut	33°54′05.50″N 35°29′07.20″E	
27=	Al Mada Tower		94 m (308 ft)	24	1998	Beirut	33°53′26.60″N 35°28′20.20″E	
27=	Raouche View At 1090		94 m (308 ft)	22	2014	Beirut	33°53′22.10″N 35°28′21.00″E	
28	Bahri Gardens		92 m (302 ft)	25	2006	Beirut	33°53′26.60″N 35°28′20.20″E	
29	Tilal Tower		91 m (299 ft)	23	2003	Beirut	33°53′15.60″N 35°31′01.80″E	
30=	Universal Tower		90 m (300 ft)	24	2014	Beirut	33°53′19.10″N 35°28′33.10″E	
30=	Verdun Gardens		90 m (300 ft)	22	2014	Beirut	33°53′29.00″N 35°29′02.00″E	A residential complex that also houses a shopping arcade and the Staybridge Suites Hotel.
30=	Safir Heliopolitan Hotel		90 m (300 ft)	23	2002	Beirut	33°53′29.60″N 35°28′21.90″E	
30=	Phoenicia Hotel Beirut		90 m (300 ft)	23	1961	Beirut	33°54′02.50″N 35°29′40.20″E	Tallest building in Lebanon from 1961 to 1974.
31	Manara 587		88 m (289 ft)	18	2005	Beirut	33°53′49.50″N 35°28′19.10″E	
32=	Titanium Tower		87 m (285 ft)	22	N/D	Beirut	33°53′12.00″N 35°28′43.10″E	
32=	Sky Garden		87 m (285 ft)	22	2014	Beirut	33°53′14.20″N 35°28′31.60″E	
32=	Majestic Tower		87 m (285 ft)	22	2013	Beirut	33°53′54.00″N 35°29′25.70″E	
32=	Mirage Plaza		87 m (285 ft)	22	2002	Beirut	33°53′33.70″N 35°29′17.10″E	
32=	St George Tower 1 (Alpha Tower)		87 m (285 ft)	22	2005	Beirut	33°53′03.60″N 35°31′14.10″E	
32=	St George Tower 2 (Delta Tower)		87 m (285 ft)	22	2005	Beirut	33°53′05.40″N 35°31′16.20″E	
32=	St George Tower 3 (Omega Tower)		87 m (285 ft)	22	2005	Beirut	33°53′04.00″N 35°31′17.10″E	
33=	Al Aidi Tower		85 m (279 ft)	23	2008	Beirut	33°53′36.10″N 35°30′42.00″E	
33=	Sursock Tower		85 m (279 ft)	18	2009	Beirut	33°53′33.40″N 35°30′41.20″E	
34=	Corniche Garden		83 m (272 ft)	21	2004	Beirut	33°54′06.20″N 35°29′04.30″E	
34=	Astoria Tower		83 m (272 ft)	21	2010	Beirut	33°53′41.20″N 35°28′14.60″E	
34=	Dreams Tower		83 m (272 ft)	21	2003	Beirut	33°54′04.60″N 35°29′12.50″E	
34=	Hilton Beirut Metropolitan Palace		83 m (272 ft)	21	2003	Sin el Fil	33°52′14.80″N 35°32′09.60″E	
35	Hugo 43		81 m (266 ft)	22	2008	Beirut	33°53′20.10″N 35°30′28.00″E	
36	Ain Mreisseh Tower		80 m (260 ft)	22	2007	Beirut	33°53′55.20″N 35°29′30.20″E	

== Tallest buildings by governorate ==
Rank	Name	Height m (ft)	Floors	Year	City	Governorate	Arabic Name
1	Sama Beirut	195.2 m (640 ft)	52	2017	Beirut	Beirut	بيروت
2	Hilton Habtoor Grand Hotel	130 m (430 ft)	30	2005	Sin el Fil	Mount Lebanon	جبل لبنان
3	Demco Towers	130 m (430 ft)	30	2016	Antelias	Metn	جبل لبنان
4	Willis Tower	56 m (184 ft)	17	N/D	Kaslik	Keserwan	كسروان
5	Manara Center	50 m (160 ft)	12	2003	Zahle	Bekka	البقاع

== Under construction buildings ==
Name	Height m (ft)	Floors	Year	City	Coordinates	Notes
The Edge	220 m (720 ft)	50	N/A	Beirut	33°53′16.00″N 35°31′07.40″E	Would replace Sama Beirut as the tallest building in Lebanon upon completion. Deeply on hold due to long-term economic instability, regional security concerns, and severe financial crisis in Lebanon.
50RISE	185 m (607 ft)	50	N/A	New Jdeideh		Would become the tallest commercial building in Lebanon upon completion. Currently on hold.
Venus Towers	122 m (400 ft)	30	N/A	Beirut	33°53′59.20″N 35°29′51.00″E	Construction stopped in 2011 by activists after the remains of a Phoenician port (dating back to at least 500 B.C.) were discovered on the site, but the project was eventually allowed by the government to bulldoze the ruins and resume the construction of the towers, sparking widespread outrage.
Grand Hyatt Beirut	82 m (269 ft)	18	N/A	Beirut	33°54′00.00″N 35°30′00.00″E	Topped out, but currently on hold.

== Proposed buildings ==
Name	Height m (ft)	Floors	City	Coordinates
Pinwheel South Tower	315 m (1,033 ft)	67	Beirut	33°54′07.60″N 35°30′17.80″E
Pinwheel North Tower	200 m (660 ft)	39	Beirut	
The Landmark	168 m (551 ft)	43	Beirut	
Beirut Trade Center	157 m (515 ft)	40	Beirut	33°53′43.00″N 35°29′47.40″E
Solidere 1493	90 m (300 ft)	22	Beirut	33°53′56.30″N 35°29′47.30″E

== Cancelled buildings ==
Name	Height m (ft)	Floors	City	Coordinates
Nara Towers and Marina	216 m (709 ft)	48	Beirut	
Al Tilal Tower	170 m (560 ft)	40	Beirut	33°53′16.90″N 35°28′37.30″E
Riad-al-Solh Tower	168 m (551 ft)	42	Beirut	
Phoenician Village	160 m (520 ft)	N/A	Beirut	33°53′58.40″N 35°30′35.85″E

== See also ==
- List of tallest structures in the Middle East
- List of skyscrapers
