= Joseph Philippe Karam =

Lebanese architect (1923–1976)

- Born: 19 March 1923; Beirut, Lebanon
- Died: 9 April 1976 (aged 53); Larnaca, Cyprus
- Education: Université Saint-Joseph
- Occupation: Architect
- Spouse: Mona Karam (née Hayek)
- Children: Fadi J. Karam; Lina J. Karam; Sami J. Karam

Joseph Philippe Karam (1923–1976) was a Lebanese architect. He was a leading figure of modern architecture in Lebanon during the country's golden era, 1945 to 1975. Karam founded his practice the Atelier d'Architecture Joseph Philippe Karam in the late 1940s.

== Completed projects ==
During his short life, Karam was a prolific designer and builder. His completed projects include: (not an exhaustive list)

Multi-Use, Office, Commercial and Institutional:

- Beirut City Center, Beirut, Lebanon
- Phoenicia Hotel Phase 2. Phase 1 had been designed by Edward Durell Stone, Beirut, Lebanon
- Aquamarina sea resort Phase 1, Jounieh, Lebanon. Phase 2 was designed in the 1980s by Karam's son, Fadi Karam.
- Queen's Building, Jeddah, Saudi Arabia
- Hotel Kandara, Jeddah, Saudi Arabia
- Philips Showroom, Beirut, Lebanon
- Anis Assaf Center, Rue Verdun, Beirut, Lebanon
- Banque Libano-Francaise, Beirut, Lebanon
- La Gondole Building, Beirut, Lebanon
- Eldorado Building, Rue Hamra, Beirut, Lebanon
- Hotel School, Jounieh, Lebanon

Residential:

- Forest Building, Beirut, Lebanon
- Karam Building, Beirut, Lebanon
- Building on Rue Verdun, Beirut, Lebanon
- Shams Building, Beirut, Lebanon
- Multiple projects, Badaro/Foret des Pins, Beirut, Lebanon
- Multiple projects, Raouche seafront, Beirut, Lebanon
- Tabet Villa, Beirut, Lebanon

More information and photos can be found at the Joseph Philippe Karam Official website and at the Joseph Philippe Karam Facebook Page.

== War damage ==
Several of Karam's buildings suffered heavy damage during the Lebanese Civil War.

Beirut City Center: Among Karam's influential projects was the Beirut City Center. Built in 1966, it was a multi-use complex that included an office building, an egg-shaped cinema and a shopping mall that was at the time the largest in the Middle East. The Beirut City Center was badly damaged during the Lebanese Civil War. In the 1990s, the complex was demolished with the exception of its iconic cinema. The "egg" (sometimes also called the dome or the soap) has survived and has over the years become a symbol of the prewar avant-garde. It has inspired artists and architects to propose a number of ideas for rehabilitation.

Talk of its possible demolition in the past two decades has mobilized students and architects in favor of its preservation. The current owners of the site have affirmed their desire to preserve it and to integrate it into a new project.

Phoenicia Hotel: In the 1960s, Karam won the commission for the second phase of the Phoenicia Hotel, at the time part of the Intercontinental Hotels chain owned by Pan American Airways. The first phase, a low-rise concrete structure built opposite the Baie de St George and the Mediterranean sea, had been designed by the American architect Edward Durrell Stone in the 1950s. Karam mimicked Stone’s exterior theme in the new high-rise addition, while putting his own mark on the large expansion of the lobby area and interiors.

In the fall of 1975, the Battle of the Hotels broke out on the Beirut waterfront, pitting militiamen in the Phoenicia Hotel against their enemies in the nearby Holiday Inn. Both hotels were burnt and vandalized and remained unused until the end of the war. The Phoenicia was renovated in the 1990s and has regained its place as one of Beirut's most luxurious hotels.

== Life and background ==
Joseph Philippe Karam was born in Beirut in 1923, the fourth child of Philippe and Chafi'a Karam. His family were Christian Maronites from the historic village of Beiteddine in the Chouf mountains southeast of Beirut. He attended primary and secondary school in Beirut at the Jesuit Collège Notre Dame de Jamhour.

Karam graduated with diplomas in Mathematics and Engineering-Architecture in 1946 from the Université Saint-Joseph’s Ecole Francaise d’Ingenieurs et d’Architectes (since renamed ESIB, or Ecole Superieure des Ingenieurs de Beyrouth).

In 1951, he married Mona George Hayek, a law school graduate. Mona was the sister of late Swatch Group founder Nicolas Hayek.

Karam had a consuming passion for modern architecture. He was an avid worker, known to rise early and to work late into the evenings and on weekends.

He died from cardiac arrest on 9 April 1976 while on a business trip.

On 9 April 2016, the Lebanese daily L'Orient-Le Jour published an article by his sons marking the 40th anniversary of his death.
