= Beirut Terraces =

- Interactive map of the Beirut Terraces area

General information
- Type: Residential
- Location: Beirut Central District, Beirut, Lebanon, 1399 Fouad Najjar Street, Minet el-Hosn
- Coordinates: 33°53′59.00″N 35°29′46.50″E
- Construction started: 2011
- Completed: 2017
- Opening: 2017
- Owner: DIB Tower SAL; TOWN Tower SAL

Height
- Architectural: 119.5 m (392 ft)
- Tip: 121.5 m (399 ft)
- Top floor: 114.6 m (376 ft)

Technical details
- Material: Aluminium; Concrete; Glass
- Floor count: 26

Design and construction
- Architect: Herzog & de Meuron Architekten
- Developer: Benchmark
- Structural engineer: Arup (Design); Khatib & Alami (Engineer of Record)
- Main contractor: MAN Enterprise

Website
- http://www.beirutterraces.com/

Beirut Terraces is a residential skyscraper in the Central district of downtown Beirut, Lebanon. It is located at 1399 Fouad Najjar Street in the Minet el-Hosn neighborhood, across from the ruined Holiday Inn Beirut and south of the Platinum Tower. It has 26 floors with an overall height of 119.5 m (392 ft). The building construction started in 2011 and finished in 2017. It was developed by Benchmark and designed by Herzog & de Meuron Architekten.

== Design ==
The building design was inspired by the classic and contemporary history of Beirut. It has a unique architectural design, which is characterized by its terraces and overhangs that were projected differently, thus forming a stack of layers building shape. This creates a harmony between the building and the cityscape.

The overhangs also provide shade and reduce solar gain. To facilitate the facades construction and upkeep, while also create terraces and protect the tenants from direct heat, the slabs of each floor were extended around their perimeter by at least 60 cm (24 in) and sustained by columns at the corners of the building. Daily temperature cycles are also balanced by the slabs' thermal mass. As a result, this system made the building design sustainable for a living.

The architects' work came under public criticism in 2022 after the construction plans for the apartments, including 3.9 m², windowless "maid rooms" for domestic workers, were published. By planning and building these chambers, Herzog & de Meuron was accused of supporting the Kafala system, deemed "inhumane" in Swiss media. The architects rejected the criticism and claimed that the accommodations were built against their recommendation and at the express request of the client.

== See also ==
- List of tallest buildings in Lebanon
