= Mayssa Jallad =

Lebanese singer, songwriter

Mayssa Jallad ميساء جلاد
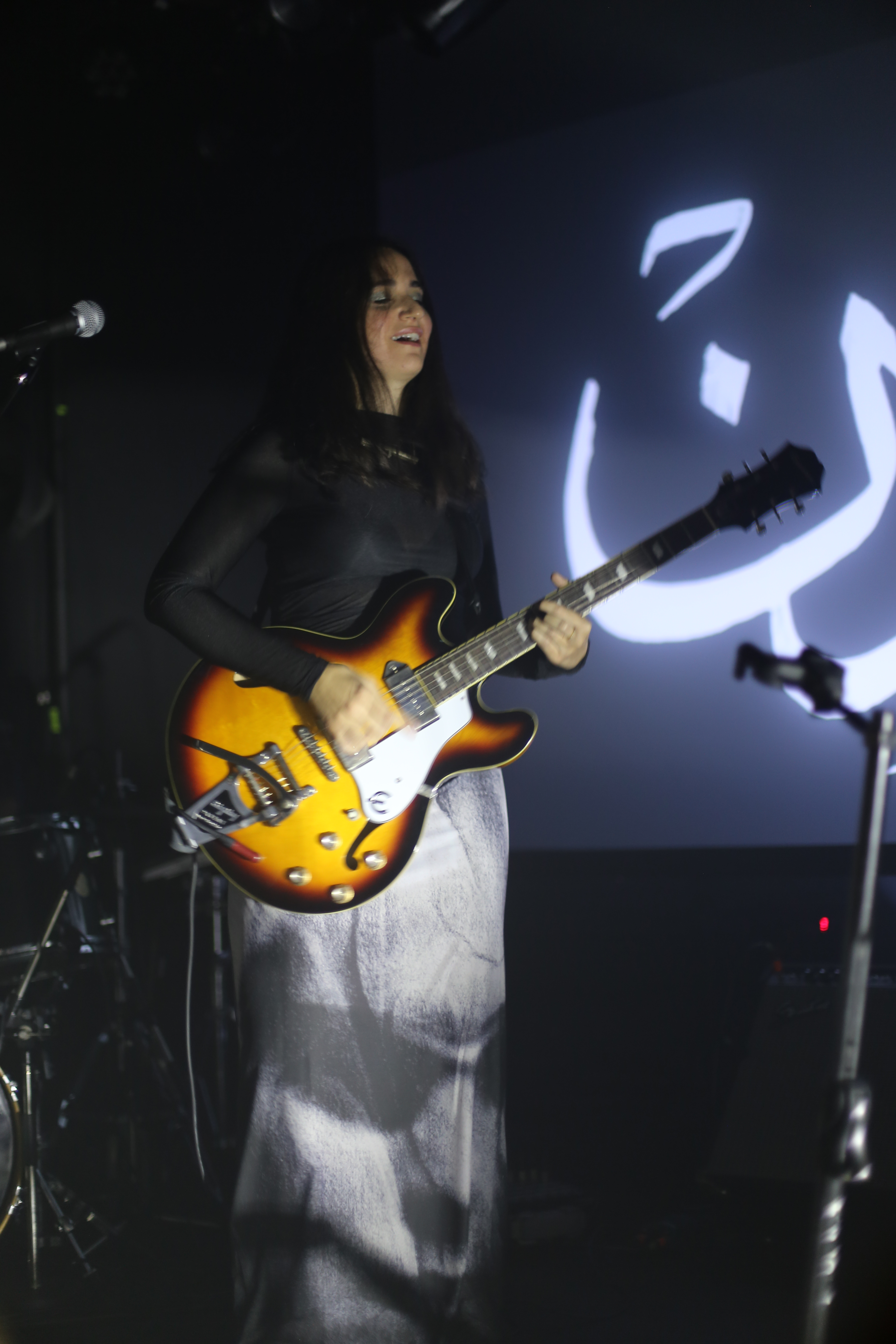
- Mayssa Jallad at Trans Musicales 2024

Background information
- Born: Mayssa Rachid Jallad; 1990 (age 34–35)
- Origin: Lebanon
- Genres: Contemporary folk music, Trip hop
- Occupation(s): Singer, Songwriter, Urban Researcher
- Years active: 2013–present
- Labels: Ruptured
- Website: mayssajallad.com

Mayssa Jallad (Arabic: ميساء جلاد; born 1990) is a Lebanese singer, songwriter, and urban researcher based in Beirut.

== Biography ==
Jallad is a bilingual singer-songwriter, architect, researcher and teacher. She studied Architecture at the American University of Beirut and received her master's degree in Historic Preservation from Columbia University's GSAPP in 2017.

In 2018, Jallad returned to her hometown, Beirut, to pursue her first solo album “Marjaa: The Battle of the Hotels”. The album narrates the history of the Battle of the Hotels during the Lebanese Civil War. Marjaa was based on Jallad's research at GSAPP where she wrote her thesis entitled Beirut’s Civil War Hotel District: Preserving the World’s First High-Rise Urban Battlefield. Marjaa was produced and co-written with Lebanese producer Fadi Tabbal at Tunefork Studios in Beirut. It was released with Ruptured Records in March 2023.

== Debut ==
Jallad's musical debut was in 2013 when she founded indie-pop band Safar with guitarist Elie Abdelnour. Safar albums were produced by Lebanese producer Fadi Tabbal at Tunefork Studios in Beirut.

Jallad also performed with Lebanese producer Zeid Hamdan as part of the band Zeid and the Wings, in Casablanca in 2014 and in Cairo and Gouna in 2015.

== Discography ==
With Safar

- 23 Kilograms EP (2014)
- Carry On EP (2015)
- Gate 03 EP (2016)
- In Transit album (2017)
- EP Studies of an Unknown Lover EP (2019)

With Khaled Allaf

- Madina Min Baeed Single (2022)

With Baada Ab - Mayssa Jallad, Omaya Malaeb, Ezra Tenenbaum & Dani Shukri

- Bi Kheir Single (2022)
- Fil Aatma Single (2022)

Solo recordings

- Marjaa: The Battle of the Hotels Album (2023)

== Film music ==
- 2023: Ode to Loneliness by Rawane Nassif (music by: Yara Asmar, vocals by: Mayssa Jallad)
