= St. Georges Hotel, Beirut =

Hotel in Beirut, Lebanon

Coordinates: 33.9023°N 35.4946°E

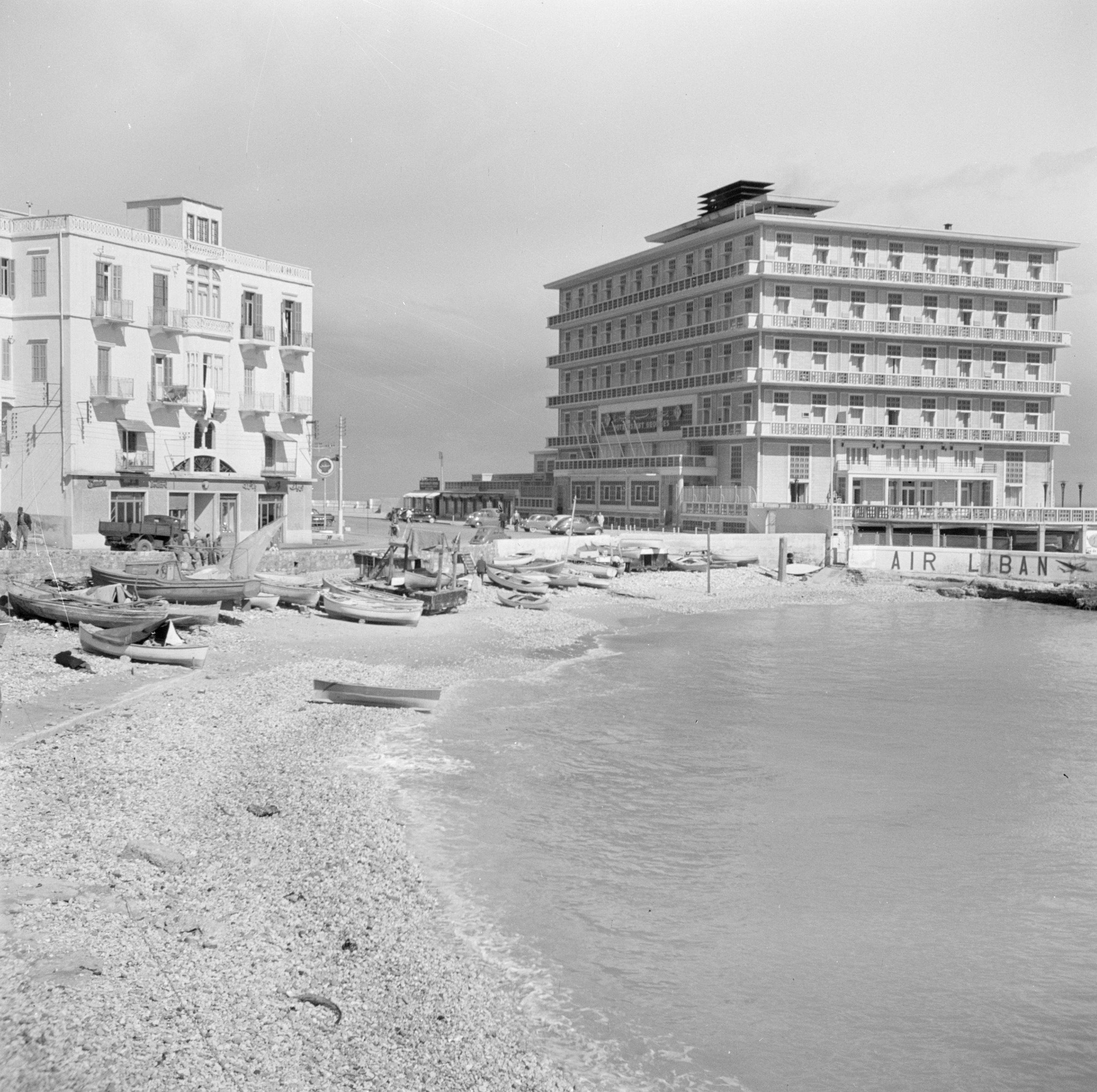
Hotel St. Georges in Beirut circa 1950

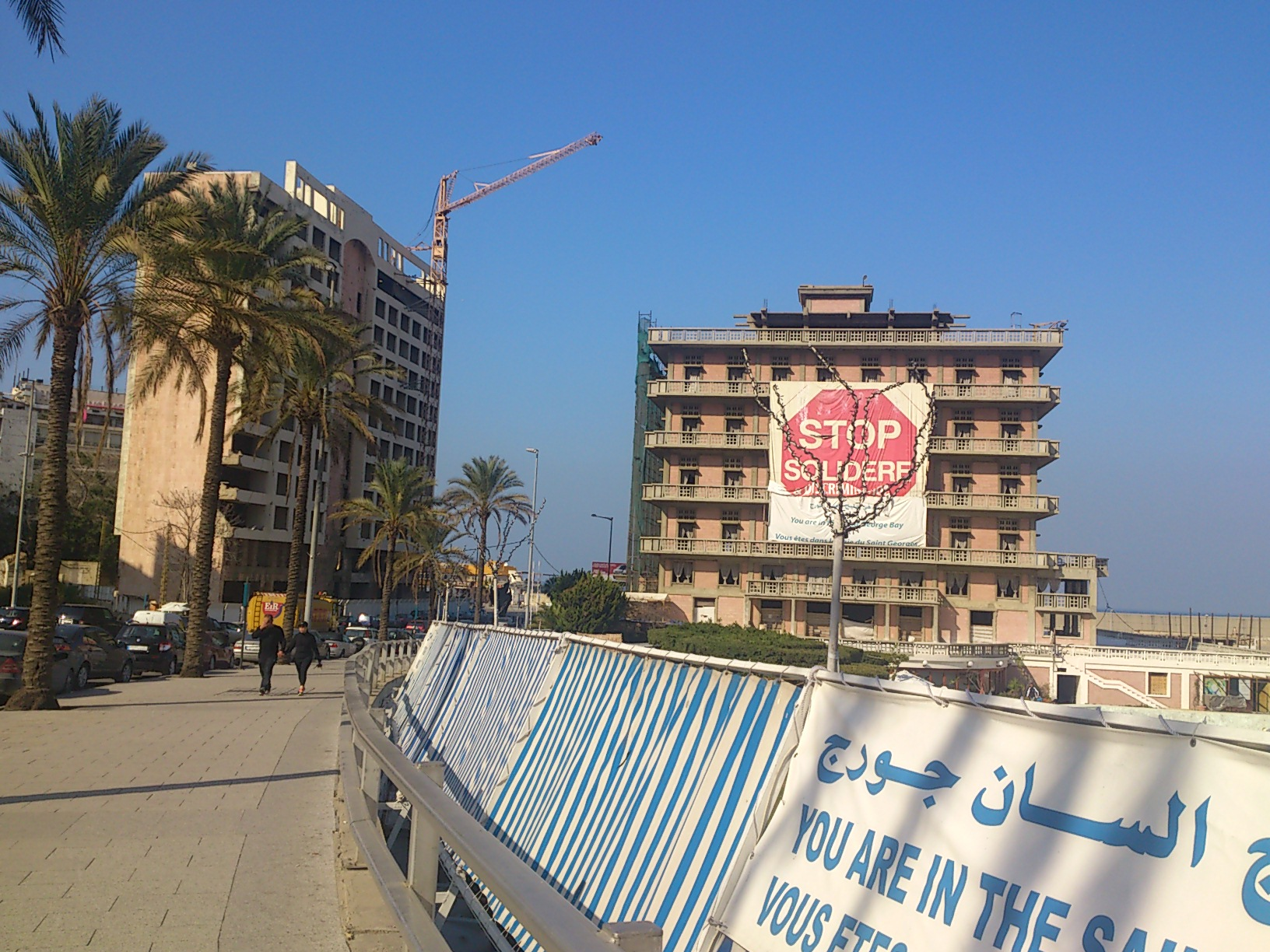
"Stop Solidere" protest sign on original Hotel St. Georges building, annex tower on the left in 2014

The Hotel St. Georges is a historic resort hotel in Beirut, Lebanon, opened in 1934. It was constructed by a French investment group, the Société Des Grands Hotels Du Levant (SGHL), during the period of the French mandate. Parisian architect Auguste Perret came to Beirut to design the hotel with local architect Antun Tabet.

Local businessman Abdallah El-Khoury, along with several partners, bought the SGHL in 1958. El-Khoury died in 1964, and his wife Nadia managed the hotel through its heyday in the 1960s and early 1970s, when guests included Brigitte Bardot, Marlon Brando, Elizabeth Taylor, Richard Burton, King Hussein of Jordan, the Shah of Iran and his wife Princess Soraya, as well as spies from both sides in the Cold War, like Kim Philby, who frequented its famous bar.

The hotel closed in 1975, as a result of the Lebanese Civil War. It was one of the main sites of the infamous Battle of the Hotels in 1975–1976, in which opposing factions battled for control of the neighborhood's luxury hotels, which were left in ruins. It was later occupied by the Syrian army, which remained there until 1990.

Beginning in 1994, the neighboring district was rebuilt by Solidere, a public-private organization headed by then-Prime Minister Rafic Hariri. Solidere came into conflict with owner Fady El-Khoury (son of Abdallah El-Khoury) when its adjacent Zaitunay Bay development was constructed. Solidere filled in a portion of Saint George Bay around the hotel and constructed an enormous breakwater that blocked the hotel's marina from accessing the sea. Work to restore the hotel was stalled for many years, as El-Khouny remained locked in lawsuits with Solidere.

In 2005, El-Khoury had just begun restoration of the hotel, as well as an annex tower across the street, which was still under construction in 1975 and had remained an unfinished ruin. On 14 February 2005, Hariri was assassinated, when a bomb was detonated directly in front of the hotel. Both of the hotel's structures were severely damaged and restoration work was halted. El-Khoury was denied a permit to restart the restoration for many years. He was finally given permission by the city authorities in February 2020. However, on July 29, 2020, a judge ordered the hotel property to be sealed, for nonpayment of taxes. El-Khoury appealed the ruling and the property was allowed to reopen the following day.
