= Nabil Gholam =

French-Lebanese architect

Nabil Gholam نبيل غلام
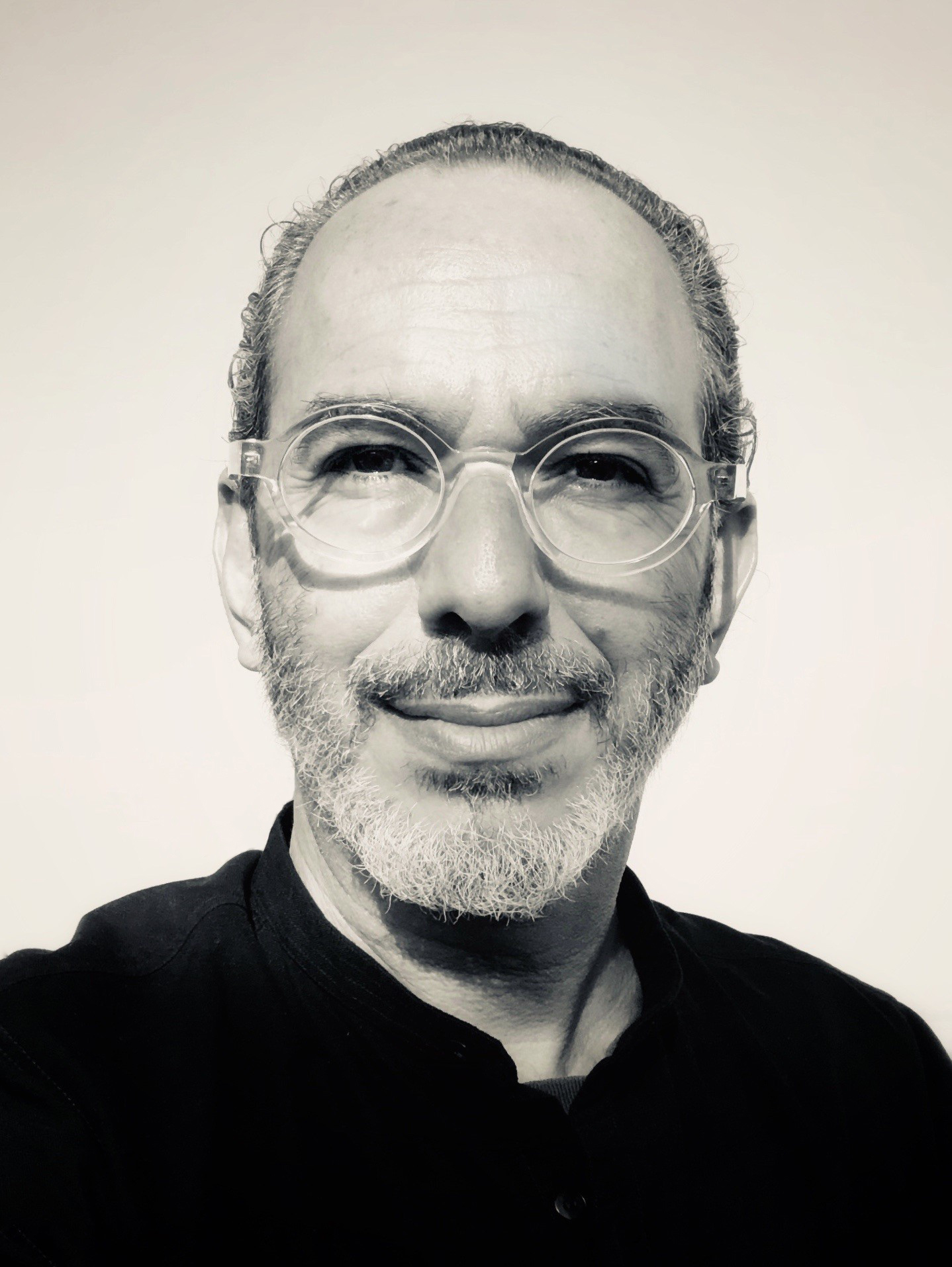
- Born: 1962 (age 63–64); Beirut, Lebanon
- Education: Paris-Villemin; Columbia University
- Occupation: Architect
- Practice: Nabil Gholam Architects
- Buildings: Platinum Tower, Sky Gate Beirut

Nabil Gholam (born 1962 in Beirut, Arabic: نبيل غلام) is a French-Lebanese architect, urban planner and the founder of Nabil Gholam Architects (ngª). In 2010, Monocle magazine has called Gholam a "leading" architect in Lebanon. In Modern Architecture: A Critical History, critic Kenneth Frampton cited Gholam's colony of holiday chalets at Faqra as one of "two works [which] promise a renewal of Lebanese architecture".

== Career ==
Nabil Gholam first studied Architecture at the UP-Paris Villemin (now merged into École nationale supérieure d'architecture de Paris-Val de Seine) and received the French DPLG degree in 1986. He then completed studies in Urban Planning at the Graduate School of Architecture of Columbia University in New York City.

From 1988 to 1994 he worked at Ricardo Bofill Taller de Arquitectura. In 1994 he came back to Beirut and founded Nabil Gholam Architects (ngª).

In Beirut, ngª had its first office on Rue Gouraud in 1994, then in 1995 on Abdelwahab al-Inglizi Street in Achrafieh. In 2002 the firm moved to the Beydoun building on Deir Nasra Street, and in 2011 to a converted industrial building in the Palais de justice neighborhood.

In 2004 the firm established a secondary office in Barcelona, and moved it to Seville in 2010.

== Works ==
This list only includes those ngª projects that were actually built, ranked by chronological order of completion.

- Sabbagh and Codsi House in Yarze near Beirut (1996–1999)
- National Shipping Company Headquarters, Beirut (1996–2001)
- Emaar Towers 1 & 2, Dubai (2000–2003)
- Home for Tania Fares in the mountains above Beirut (2000–2004)
- La Pajarita family home in Carmona, Spain, with Ana Corberó (2002–2009)
- Demerdjian House in Rabieh near Beirut (2003–2009)
- Platinum Tower in Beirut, with Ricardo Bofill Taller de Arquitectura (2002–2009)
- Kempinski Hotel in Aqaba, Jordan (2004–2009), on the Red Sea waterfront
- Buildings at Saifi 146 (2001–2009), Foch 94 (2004–2010), and Waqf Foch (2002–2011) in Beirut Central District and Saifi Village
- Clouds Faqra Club in Faqra (2005–2010)
- Garden View building, Beirut (2004–2011)
- CMA CGM Beirut Headquarters (2005–2011)
- Harbor Tower, Beirut (2006–2012), a 24-storey residential development
- House for Philippe Jabre on the ruins of a 1930s villa destroyed during the Lebanese Civil War above Beirut (2005–2012).
- Irani Oxy Engineering Complex (IOEC) on the campus of American University of Beirut (2005–2013), the first project in Lebanon registered for a LEED certification
- Sky Gate tower in Beirut (2007–2014), Beirut's tallest building at the time of completion and now its third-tallest
- Beirut Marina Yacht Club & Zaitunay Bay (2002–2014), in association with Steven Holl and L.E.FT. Architects
- Saifi Plaza first phase, Beirut (2005–2017)
- Qortuba Oasis (Wadi Qortuba), Riyadh (2012–2018)
- Golden Tower, Jeddah (2011–2018)
- Dalfa Seafront on Corniche Beirut, Ras Beirut (2016–2019)
- Doha Oasis complex (2010–2020) in Doha, Qatar

== Awards ==
- 2005 CityScape Award for Doha Gardens development design in Khobar, Dammam metropolitan area, Saudi Arabia
- 2006 MIPIM AR Future Projects Award, overall winner and winner in the "Masterplanned Communities" category, also for Doha Gardens in Khobar
- 2012 Green GOOD Design Award from Chicago Athenaeum and European Centre for Architecture Art Design and Urban Studies, for the IOEC Building at AUB
- Honorable Mention in Architectural Design / Residential Architecture from Architecture Masterprize, for the Jabre house

== Gallery ==
Platinum Tower, Beirut

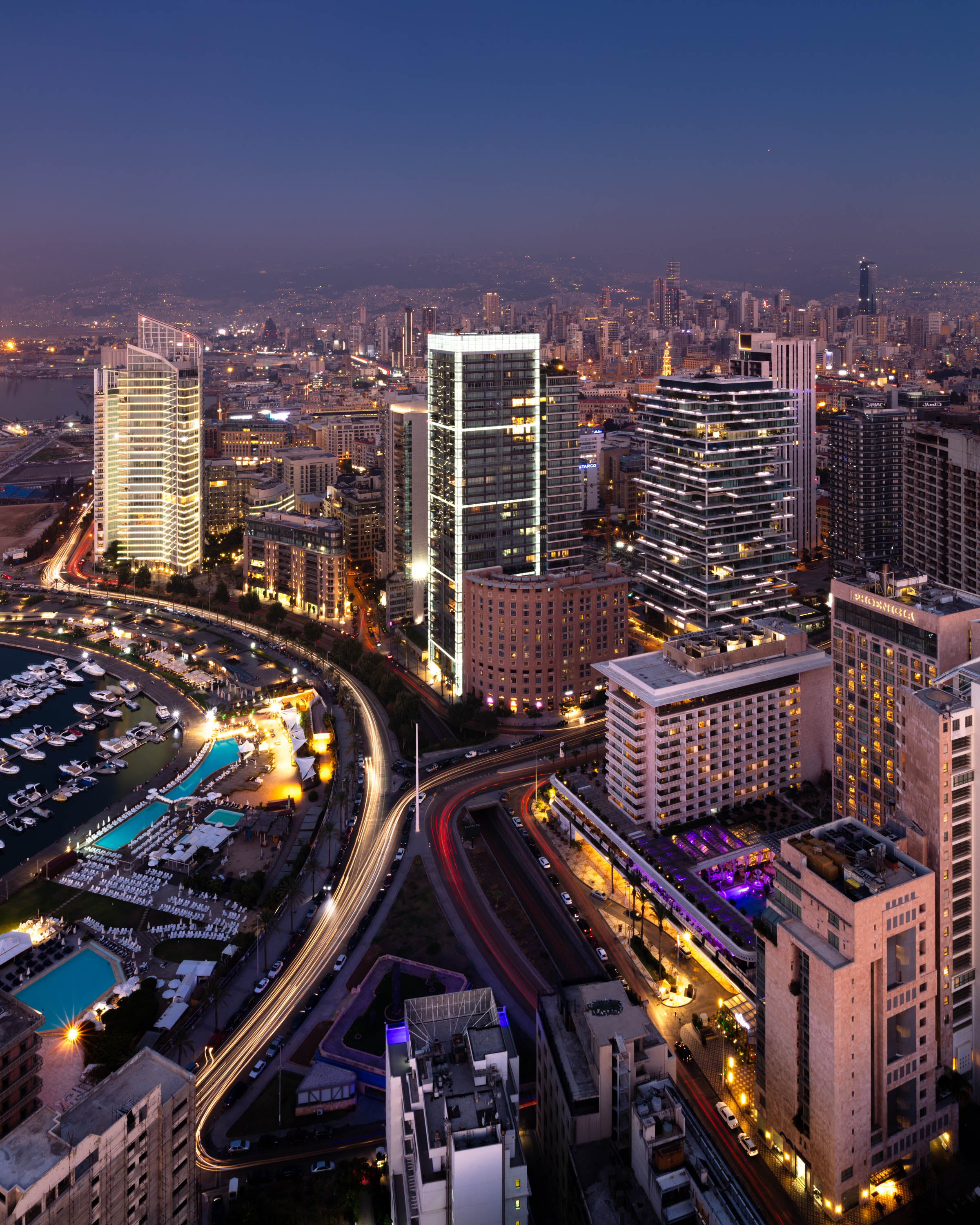
Platinum Tower, aerial view

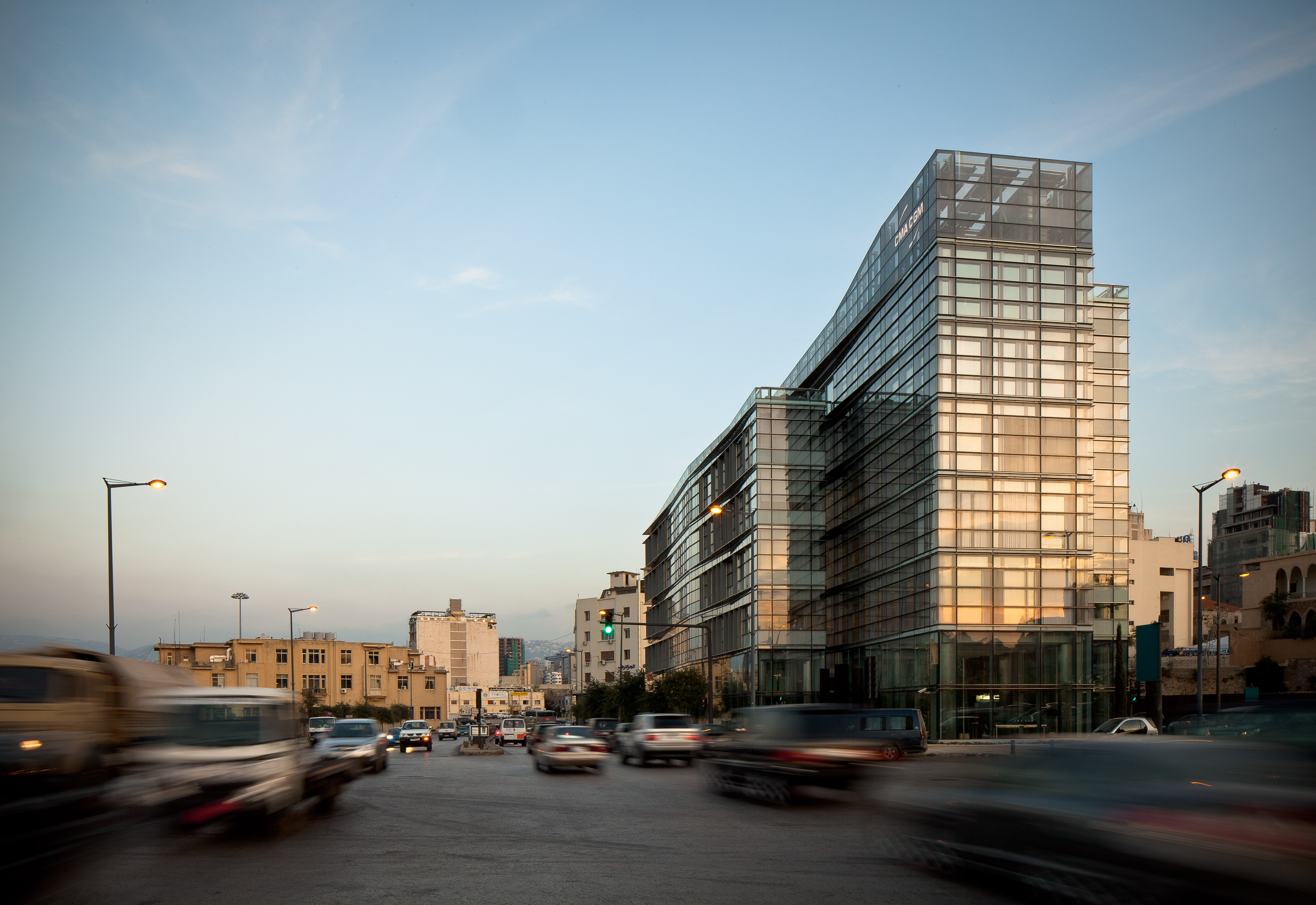
CMA CGM Headquarters, Beirut

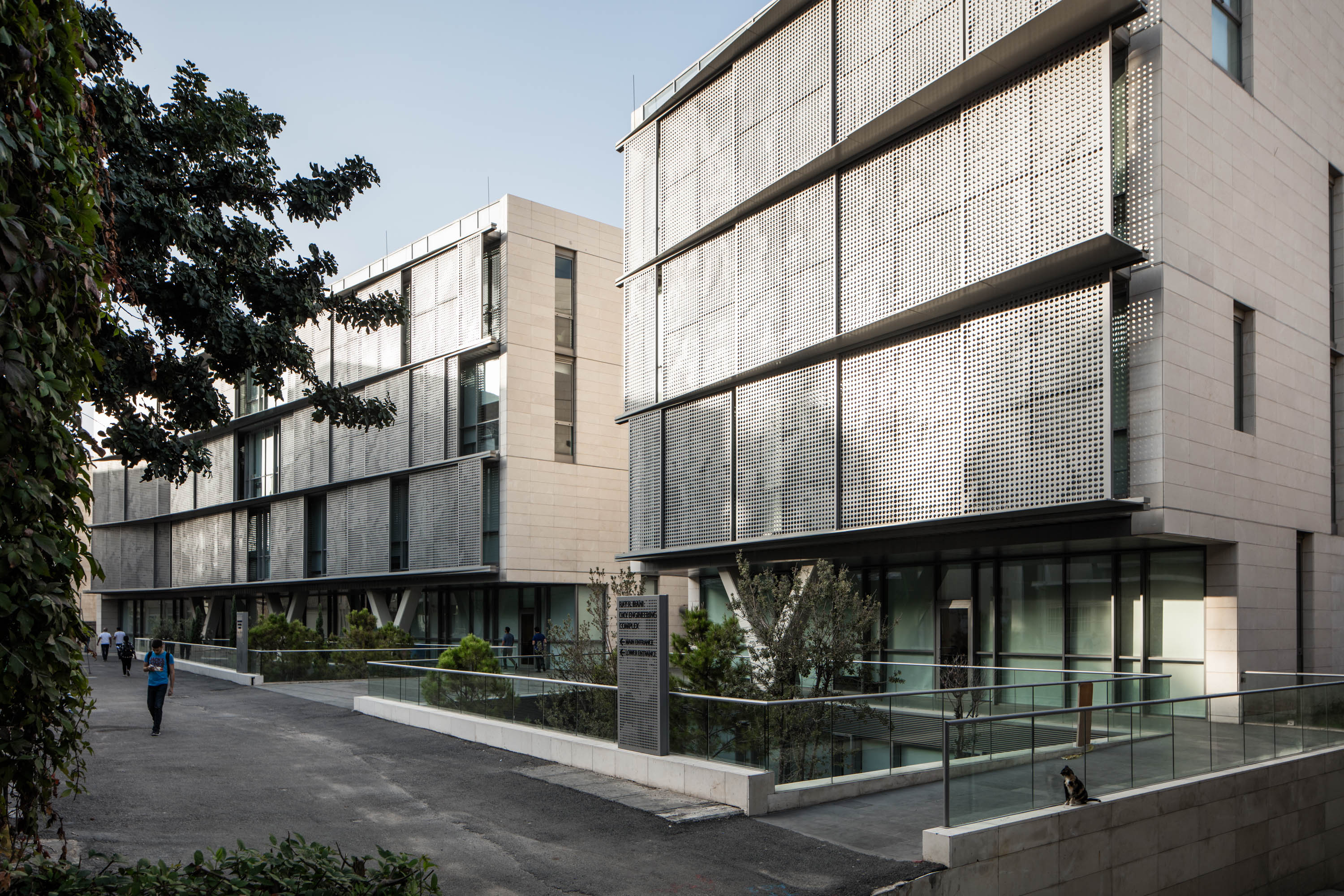
Irany Oxy Engineering Complex, American University of Beirut

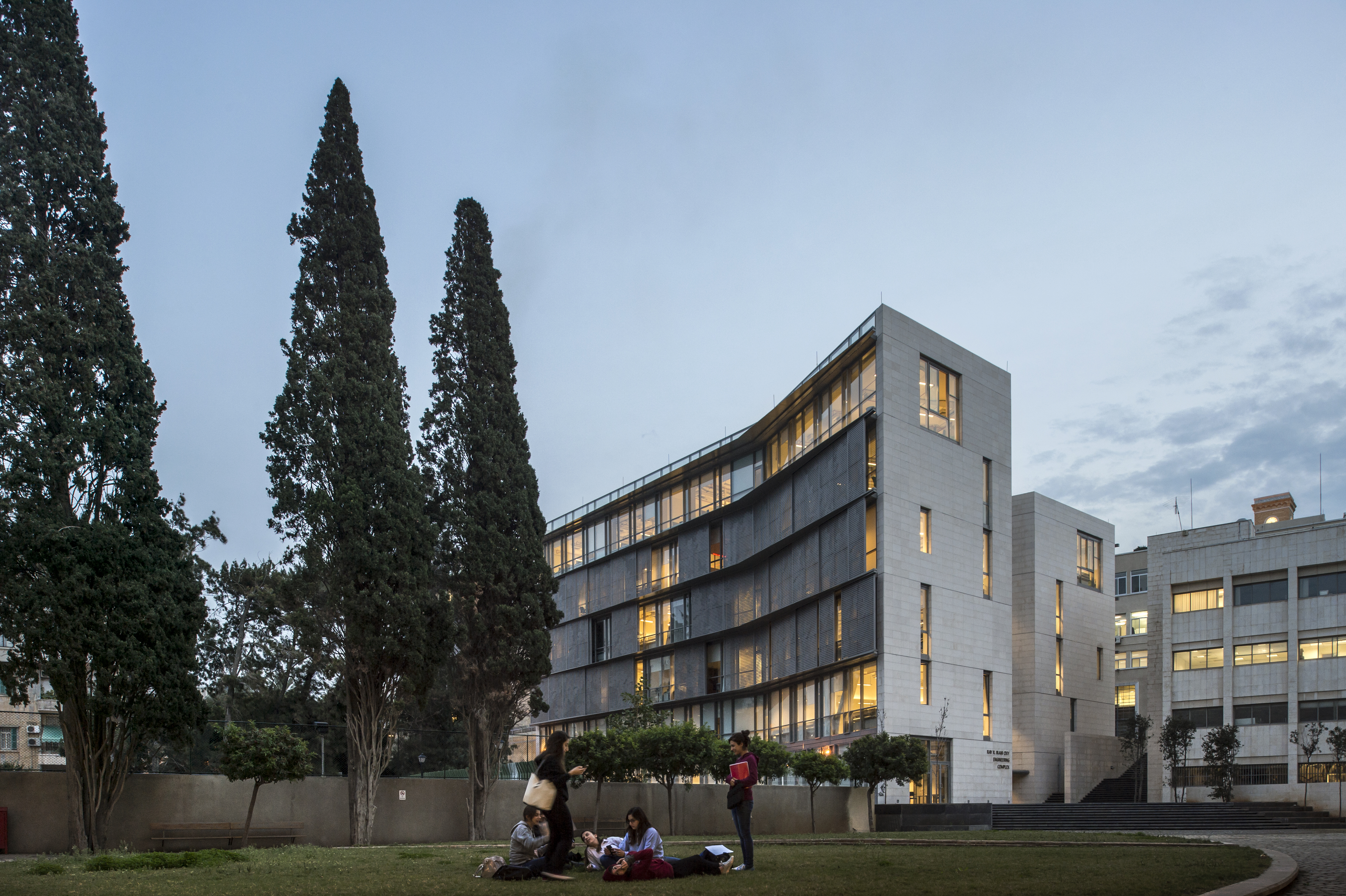
Irany Oxy Engineering Complex

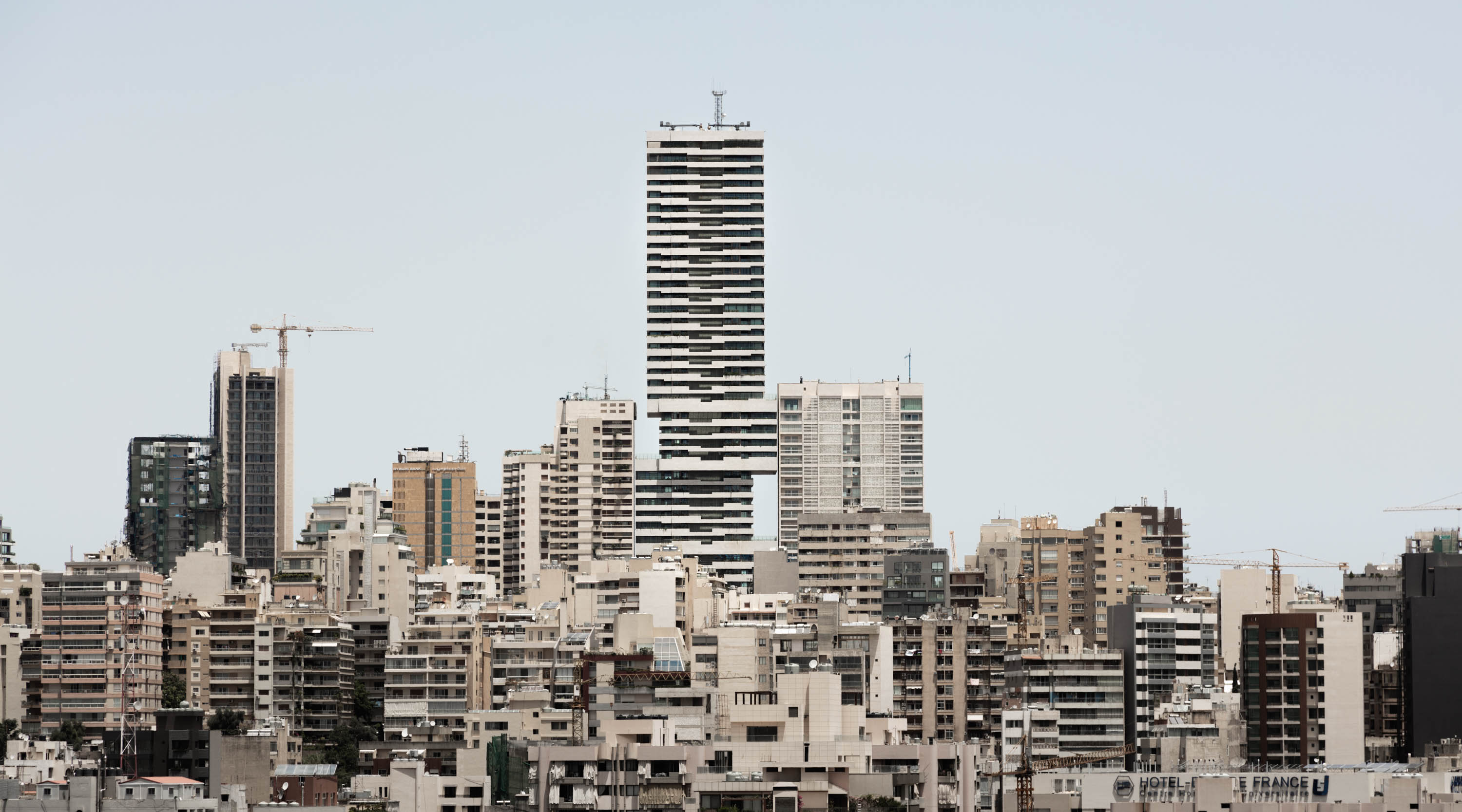
Sky Gate Beirut (center)

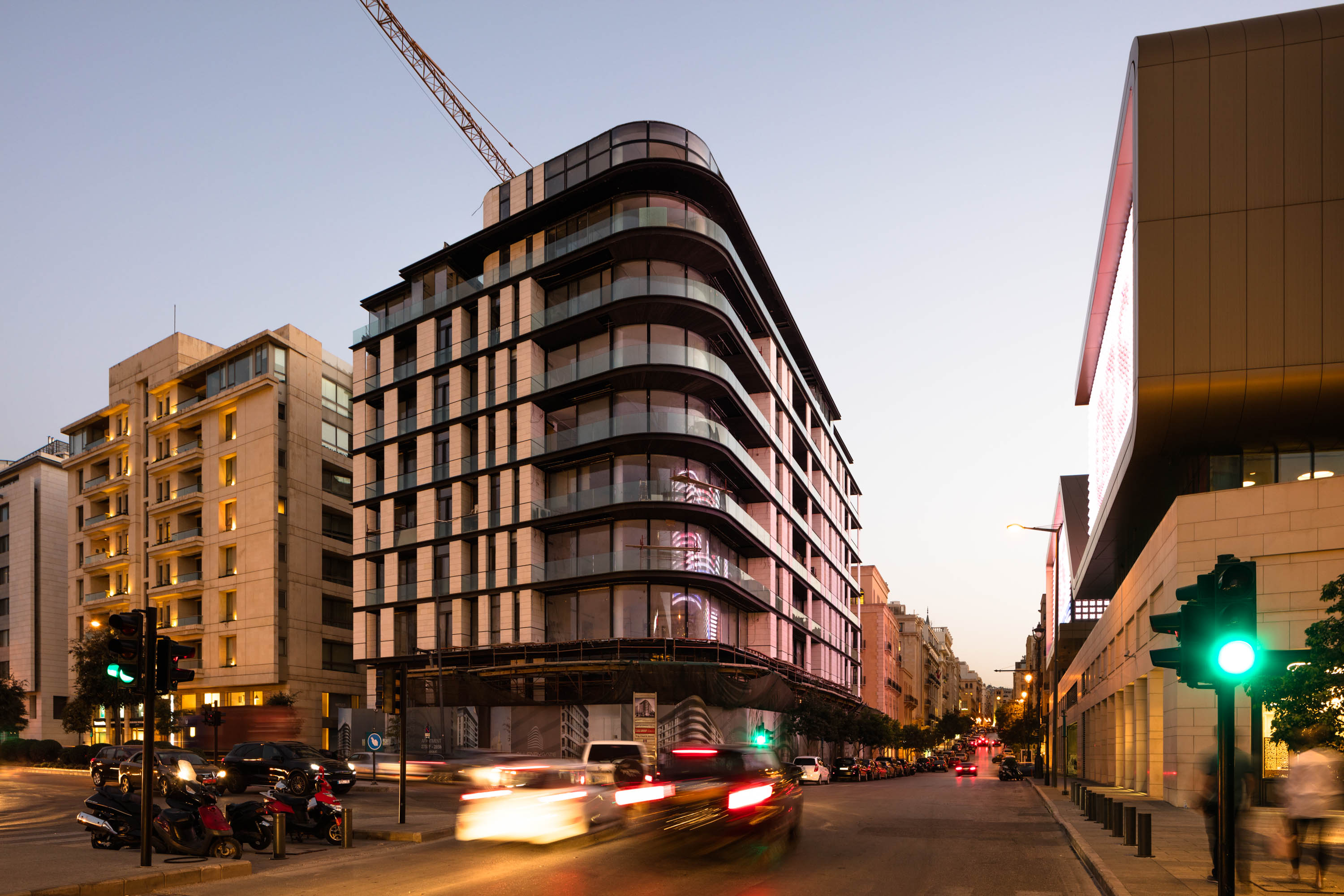
Allenby Gate, Beirut

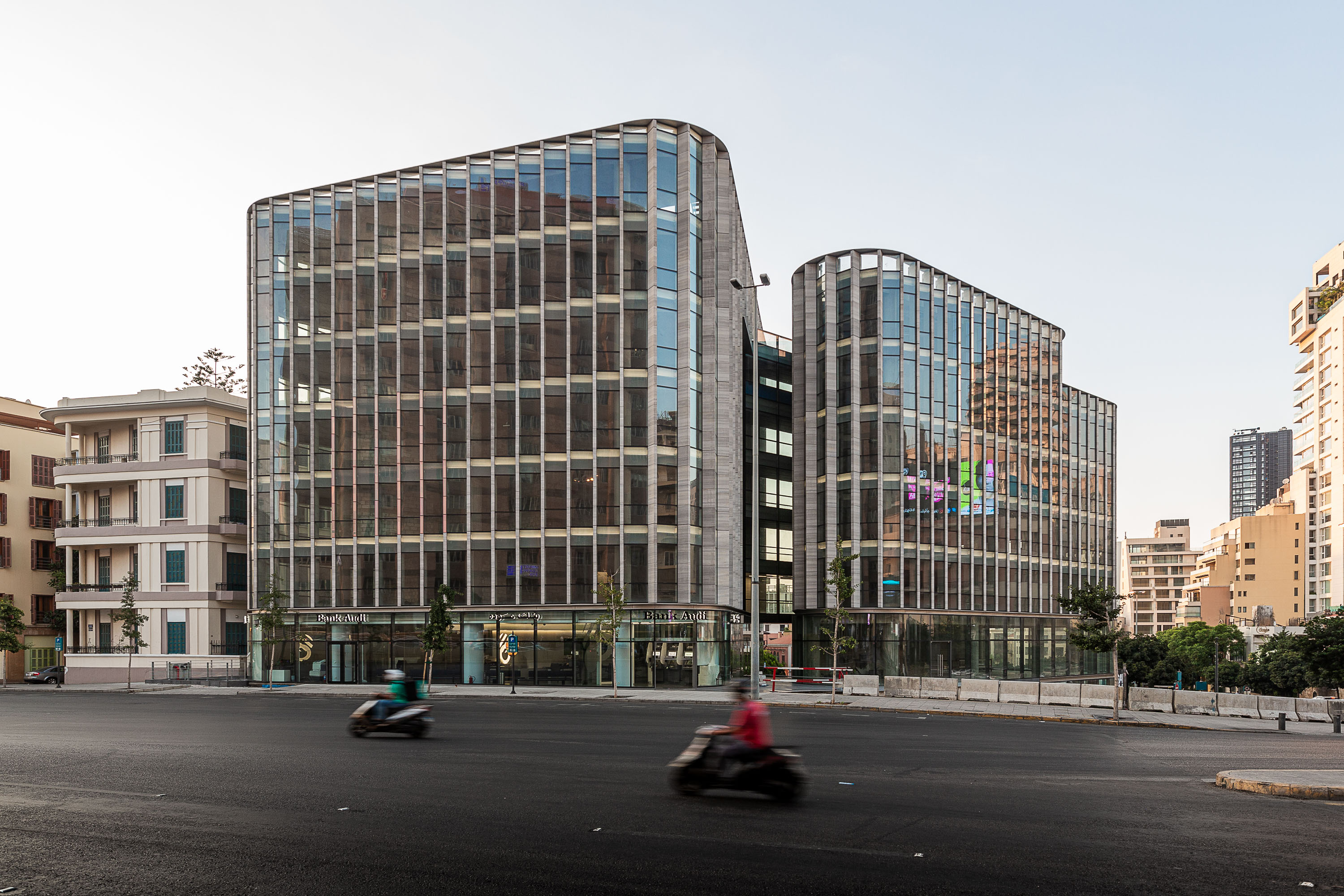
Saifi Plaza, Beirut
