= Sky Gate Beirut =

Sky Gate
- سكاي جايت
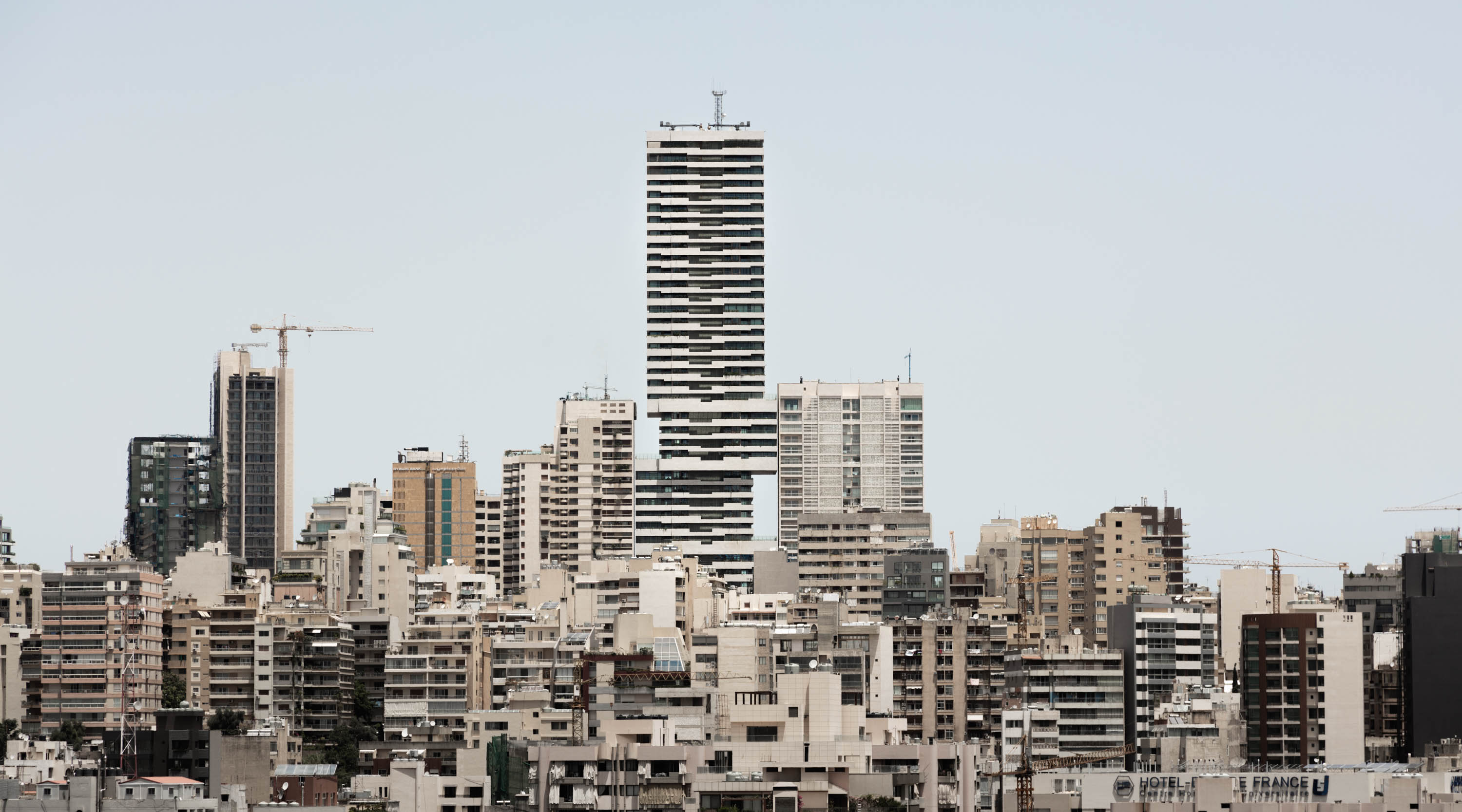
- Sky Gate viewed from the south

Record height
- Tallest in Lebanon from 2014 to 2016^{[I]}
- Surpassed by: Sama Beirut

General information
- Status: Completed
- Location: Beirut, Lebanon
- Completed: 2014
- Owner: Sky Gate MENA

Height
- Top floor: 180 metres (590 ft)

Technical details
- Floor count: 42

Design and construction
- Architect: Nabil Gholam

Other information
- Parking: 400 spaces

Website
- www.nabilgholam.com/project.8

Sky Gate is a high-rise building built in the heart of the Achrafieh District in Beirut. From its completion in 2014 until late 2016, Sky Gate was the tallest structure in Lebanon. The tower is composed of four superimposed block-like sections that accommodate 42 floors in an unconventional' design. Sky Gate is situated on the peak-point of Achrafieh, offering a 360 degree view of Beirut and Mount Lebanon. Tilal Beirut and the Atomium twin towers surround Sky Gate from both sides. This tower and others like it have been thoroughly criticized for their effect on the city as a whole, particularly in the manner in which they contribute to the loss of local built heritage and a steady increase in inflation

== Concept ==
Sky Gate is designed and executed by Lebanese architect Nabil Gholam. The project is composed of a high rise and a low rise structure that consist of 42 floors.

== Features ==
Sky Gate has the following features:

- Tallest fully residential building in Beirut with 42 floors with 3.5m ceiling heights;
- A health club and fitness center;
- Indoor and outdoor swimming pools, a sauna and steam rooms;
- 360 degree views of the city, sea and surrounding mountains, especially from the upper floors;
- Landscaping and water features occupying 3000m², with a unique running track in the gardens;
- State of the art amenities, including a fitness center as well as indoor and outdoor swimming pools;
- Parking lots for residents and guests, as well as a driver's room and storage for each apartment; and
- An advanced structure capable of withstanding severe earthquakes.

== Accommodation Variety ==
Throughout the High Rise bloc, the 42 floors of Sky Gate contain simplexes and duplexes:

=== Normal simplex apartments ===
- 224m²
- 345m²
- 506m²

=== Duplex Apartments ===
- 750m²
- 788m²
- 847m²

=== Penthouses ===
- 750m²
- 1,515m²

== Honors ==
Sky Gate has been honored as:

- An international award at MIPIM for its design
