= The Edge (Beirut) =

General information
- Status: On-hold
- Type: Residential and Hotel
- Location: Beirut, Lebanon
- Construction started: 2016

Height
- Roof: 220 m (720 ft)

Technical details
- Floor count: 52
- Floor area: 57,000 m^{2} (610,000 sq ft)

Design and construction
- Architects: Dagher, Hanna & Partners
- Structural engineer: Bureau d'Etudes Rodolphe Mattar
- Main contractor: Park Hill SAL

The Edge is a landmark mixed use (hotel and residential) tower on hold in Beirut, Lebanon. It is currently Lebanon's tallest building at 220 metres (720 ft) and has 52 floors.

== See also ==
- List of tallest buildings in Lebanon
- List of tallest buildings in the world by country
- List of tallest structures in the Middle East
