= André Wogenscky =

French architect

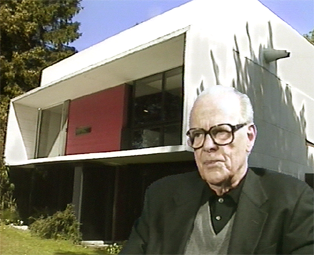
André Wogenscky

André Wogenscky (3 June 1916 – 5 August 2004) was a French Modernist architect and member of the Académie des Beaux-Arts. He was the designer of the Holiday Inn Beirut, which was damaged during the Lebanese Civil War and which remains in a dilapidated state.
