= The Egg, Beirut =

Coordinates: 33.893495°N 35.505989°E

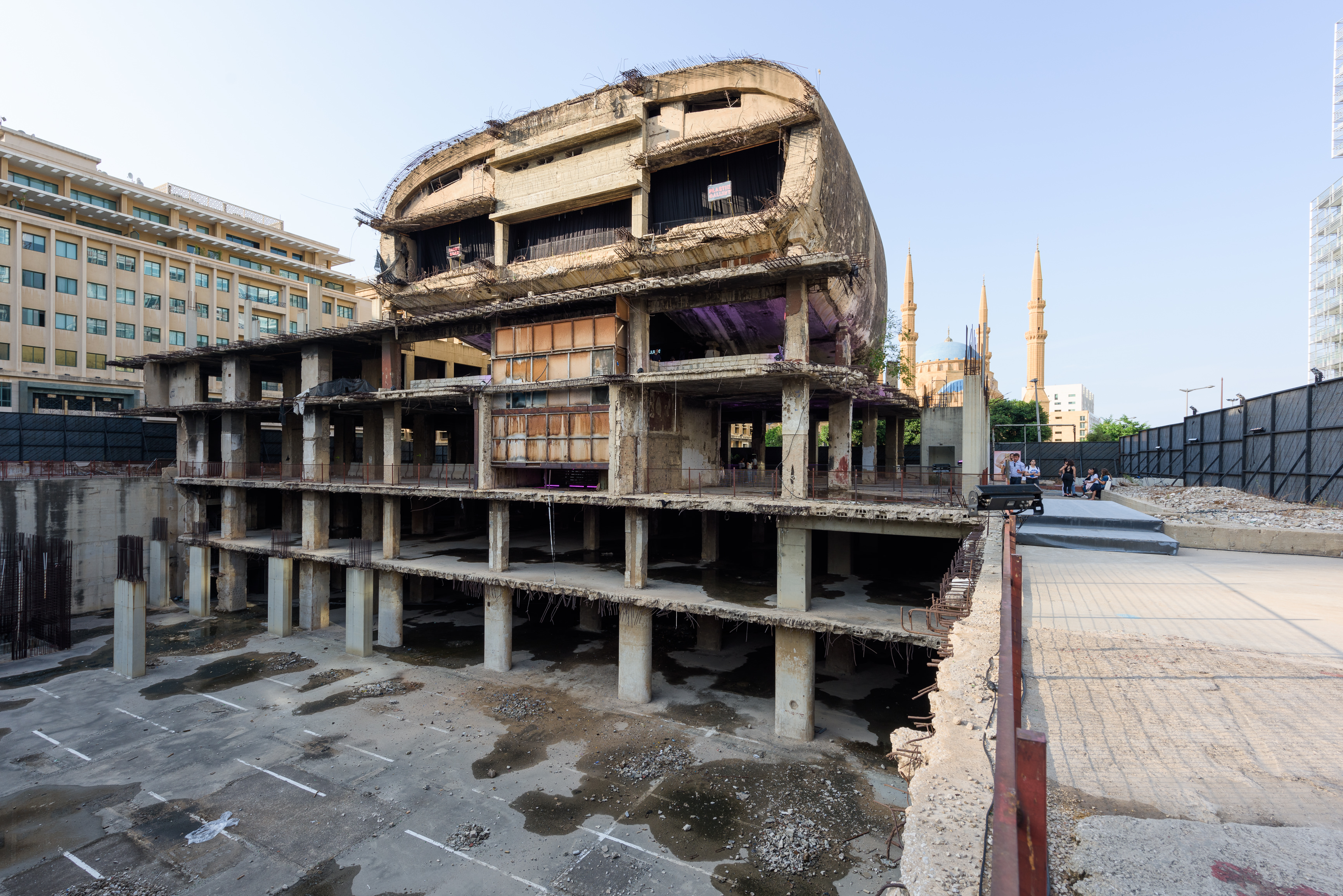
The Egg in 2018

The Egg, or the Dome, is an unfinished cinema building in Beirut, Lebanon. Its construction began in 1965 but was interrupted with the outbreak of the Lebanese Civil War in 1975 and the horse-shoe shaped dome that remains today is now a landmark in Beirut. Youssef El Zein, founder of GroupZein S.A.L, was assigned for the interior works. It was part of a commercial and residential project named "Beirut City Center", by architect Joseph Philippe Karam.

Talk of its possible demolition in the 1990s and 2000s mobilized students and architects in favor of its preservation. The owners of the site have affirmed their desire in 2013 to preserve it and to integrate it into a new project.

During the Lebanese protests of 2019 and 2020, the Egg was used as a center for talks and lectures by academics, artists, and students among others. This was called "eggupation" by those participating in it. The talks included "Capitalism in Crisis" by Lebanese politician Charbel Nahhas which about 200 university students attended. Protest slogans were also written on the walls of the Egg including those calling for the "fall of the regime."

== Gallery ==
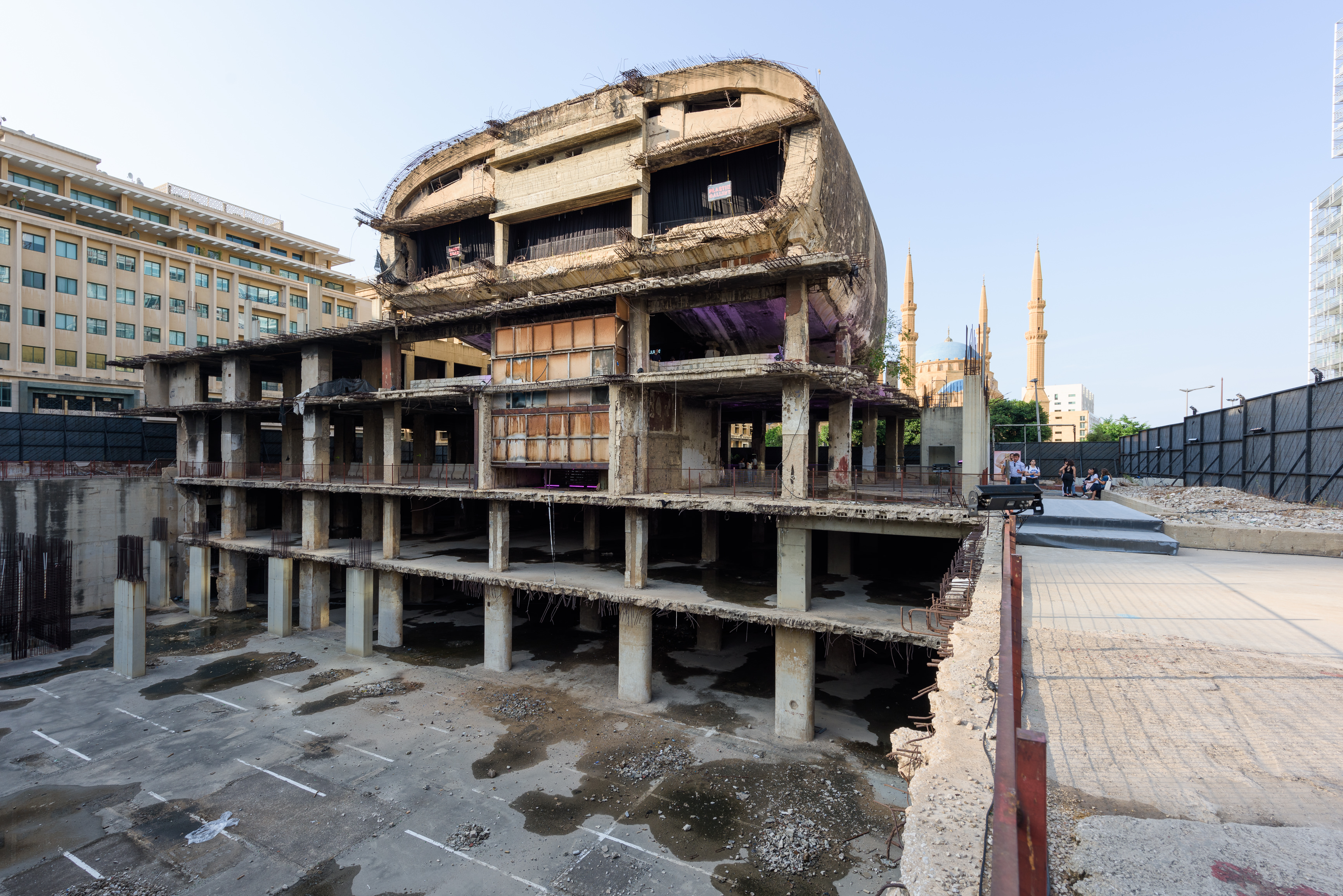

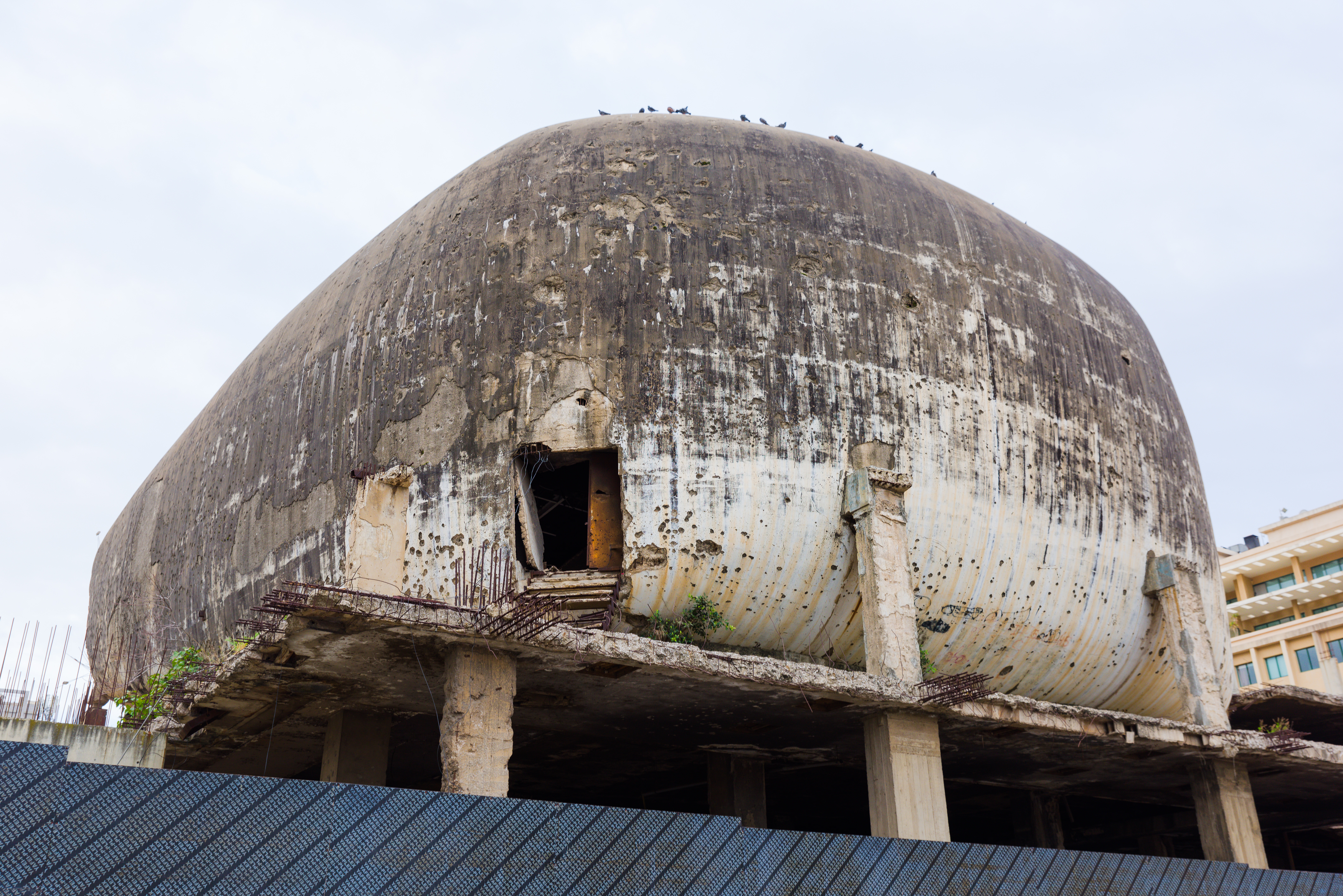

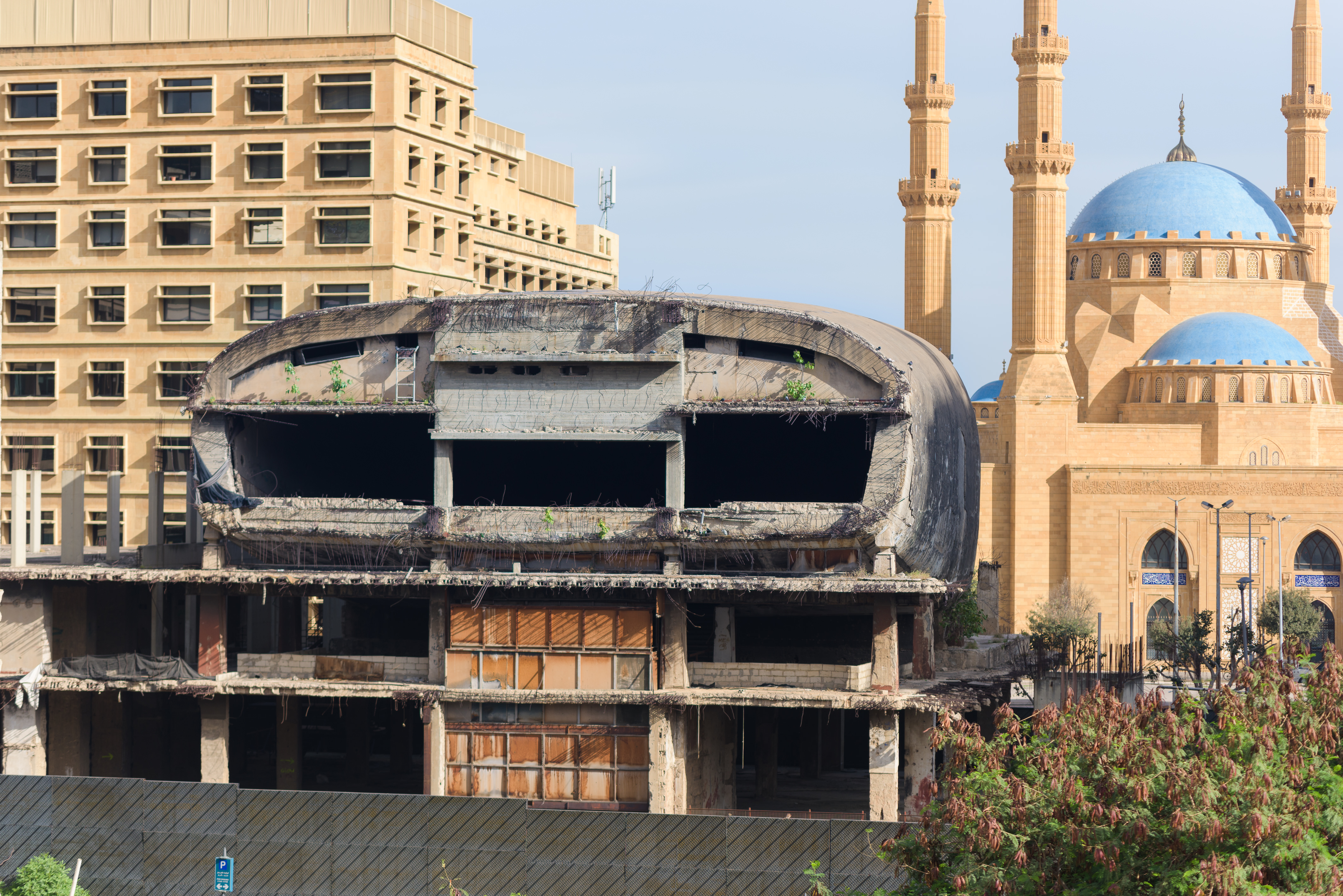
