= Sama Beirut =

Building in Beirut, Lebanon

- سما بيروت

General information
- Status: Completed
- Type: Mixed-used (Residential, Offices, Commercial)
- Location: Sodeco (Beirut), Lebanon, Beirut, Lebanon
- Construction started: 2010
- Completed: 2017
- Opening: 2017

Height
- Antenna spire: N/A
- Roof: 195 m (640 ft)
- Top floor: 51

Technical details
- Floor count: 51
- Lifts/elevators: 9

Design and construction
- Architects: Elie and Randa Gebrayel
- Developer: Fadi Antonios (Antonios Projects SAL)
- Structural engineer: ERGA Group
- Main contractor: MAN Enterprise

Website
- erga.com/project/sama-beirut-tower/

Sama Beirut is a residential, commercial and office tower in the Sodeco region of Beirut, Lebanon. The project was announced on August 13, 2009 and was opened in 2016. Fadi Antonios developed the project, and it is owned by his company, Antonios Projects SAL. When this project was completed, it became the tallest building in Lebanon, standing at 195 meters (640 ft).

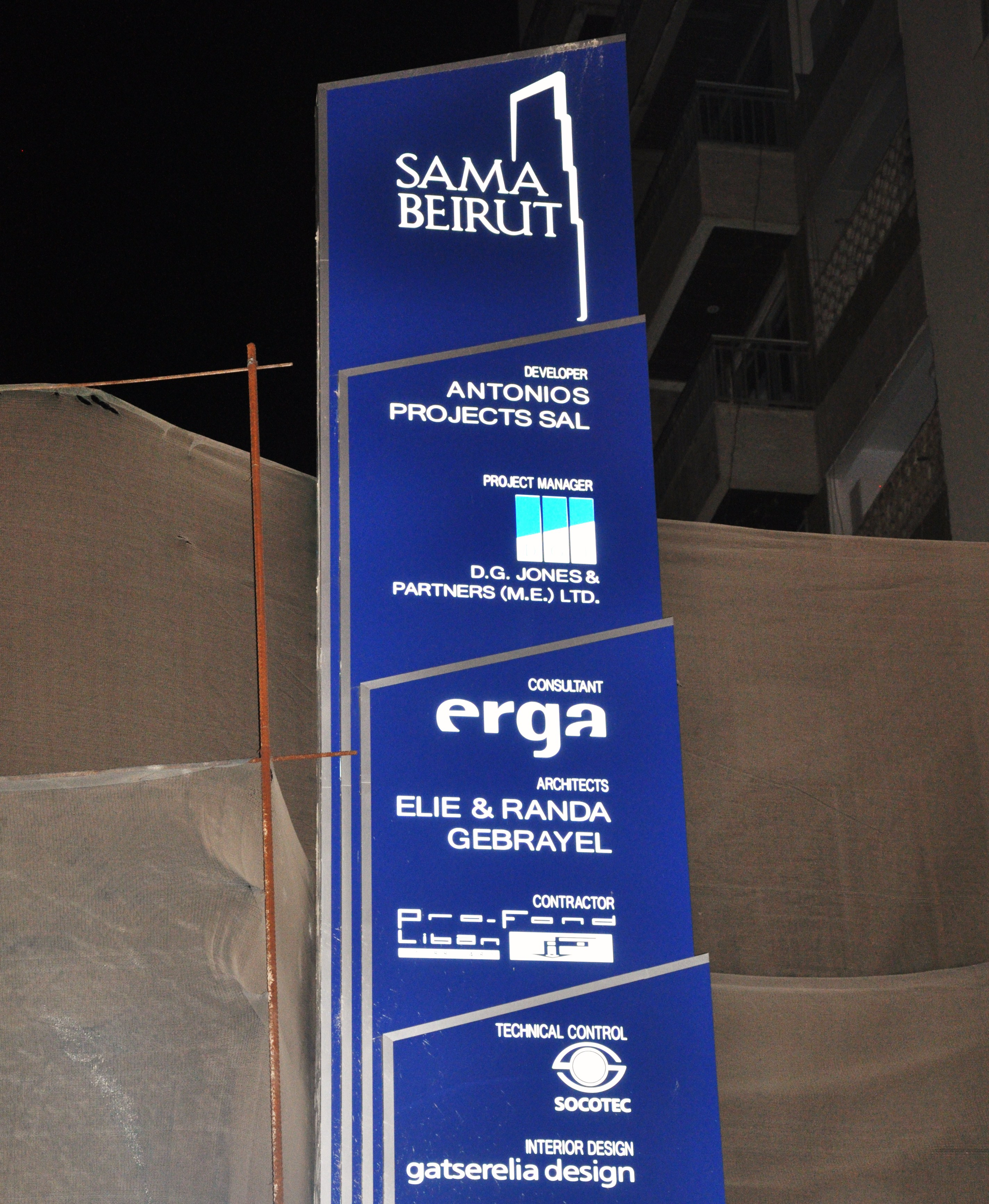
Descriptive panel on the Sama Beirut construction site at night

== See also ==
- List of tallest buildings in Lebanon
