= Phoenicia Hotel Beirut =

Hotel in Beirut, Lebanon

InterContinental Phoenicia Beirut
- The Original 1961 Phoenician Tower to the left, the 1968 Roman Tower in the middle, and the 2003 Residence Tower adjacent on right.

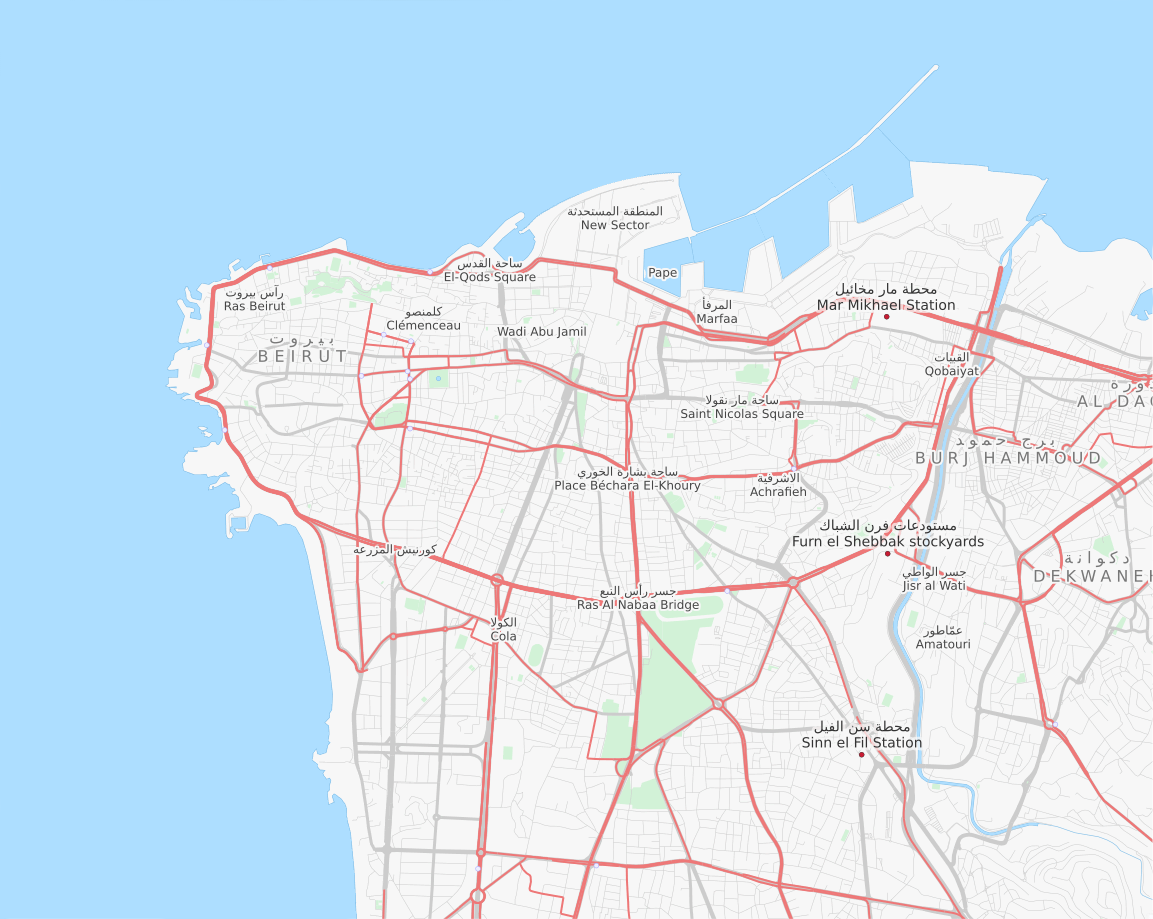
- Location within Beirut

General information
- Location: Beirut, Lebanon
- Coordinates: 33°54′2″N 35°29′40″E
- Opening: 23 December 1961
- Owner: La Société des Grands Hotels du Liban
- Operator: InterContinental Hotels

Design and construction
- Architect: Edward Durell Stone
- Main contractor: Raffoul Fakhry

Other information
- Number of rooms: 446
- Number of restaurants: 7
- Parking: Available

Website
- www.ihg.com/intercontinental/hotels/us/en/beirut/beyha/hoteldetail

The InterContinental Phoenicia Beirut is a 5-star luxury hotel situated in the Minet El Hosn neighborhood of Beirut, Lebanon. It is located on Rue Fakhreddine near the Corniche Beirut promenade and walking-distance from Beirut Central District, and a few kilometers from Beirut Rafic Hariri International Airport.

== History ==
The Phoenicia was built by the Lebanese businessman Najib Salha, who founded La Société des Grands Hotels du Liban (SGHL) in 1953. It was designed by the American architect Edward Durell Stone, working with American architect Joseph Salerno and local architects Ferdinand Dagher and Rodolphe Elias. The design incorporates Levantine influences in its high ceilings, sweeping staircases and palatial pillars. The hotel's interiors and furniture were contracted with the New York firm of William M. Ballard and were designed by Neal Prince, who was responsible for the interior decoration of most Intercontinental Hotels at the time.

The hotel opened to the public on 23 December 1961, as the Phoenicia Intercontinental, managed by the American Intercontinental Hotels chain. However its grand opening was not celebrated until three months later, on 31 March 1962, when Lebanese Prime Minister Rashid Karami presided over the ribbon-cutting ceremony and actress Dorothy Dandridge sang in the Le Paon Rouge nightclub as the guest of honour. The hotel had 310 rooms and suites, shops, restaurants and a swimming pool with a bar at the time of its opening. In 1966, Intercontinental Hotels added a hyphen to its name, therefore becoming the Hotel Phoenicia Inter-Continental.

The hotel was an immediate success, operating at near constant 100 percent occupancy. As a result, plans were made to expand it. An adjacent property was purchased by SGHL in 1963. Local architect Joseph Philippe Karam was commissioned to design a 22-story, 270-room addition, which opened on 19 April 1968, increasing the number of rooms at the hotel to 600.

The hotel became a battlefield in the Lebanese Civil War in 1975–6, during fighting known as the Battle of the Hotels between the Lebanese National Movement and the Lebanese Front, and was left a burnt-out ruin. It was abandoned for nearly twenty-five years until the late 1990s, when Mazen and Marwan Salha, Najib Salha's sons and members of the board of directors of SGHL, decided to restore the hotel.

It reopened on 22 March 2000, as the Phoenicia Inter-Continental Beirut, following a $100 million restoration project by architects Hellmuth, Obata + Kassabaum. Inter-Continental Hotels was reorganized as InterContinental Hotels Group in 2003, and the hotel's name was modified, losing the hyphen and becoming the Phoenicia InterContinental Beirut. In July 2003, a third tower, the Phoenicia Residence, consisting of 35 luxury apartments, was opened. The Phoenicia was damaged in the 2005 bombing assassination of Rafik Hariri in the street in front of the hotel and closed for three months for repairs. In 2011, it underwent a US$50 million revamp that coincided with its 50-year anniversary. In 2012, it was rebranded as the Phoenicia Hotel Beirut, dropping the use of the InterContinental name, though it remained a part of the worldwide chain.

The hotel closed on 5 August 2020, due to damage from the 2020 Beirut explosion the previous day. The Phoenicia Residences tower, containing 35 luxury apartments, reopened in July 2022. The hotel reopened on 3 October 2022 as InterContinental Phoenicia Beirut, with 193 rooms in the original 1961 Phoenician tower, as well as the hotel's restaurants and banquet facilities. On the occasion of the grand reopening, Mazen and Marwan Salha were awarded the National Order of the Cedar, the highest state order in Lebanon, by Prime Minister Najib Mikati. The 1968 Roman Tower, with 253 rooms, reopened in June 2023.

== Art collection ==
When the Phoenicia celebrated its 50th anniversary, it revealed a collection of contemporary art, featuring works of Howard Hodgkin, Sam Francis, Jan Dibbets, Andy Goldsworthy, Paul Morrison and a Mud Circle by Richard Long.

== In film ==
As a Beirut landmark, the Phoenicia has appeared in numerous feature movies across its history. It is featured in the 1965 Mickey Rooney film 24 Hours to Kill. In Agent 505: Death Trap in Beirut (1966), the protagonist stays in the city's glamorous palace. In Circle of Deceit (1981) Volker Schlöndorff makes use of the Phoenicia by having the characters seemingly lodging in the hotel while it has already been damaged by the war. In fact, the outside scenes were shot on location, while the interior scenes were done at Casino du Liban. Joana Hadjithomas and Khalil Joreige’s Je veux voir (English title: I want to see) (2008), starts on the last floor of the Phoenicia: Catherine Deneuve says she wants to see the destruction of the 2006 Lebanon War.

== Gallery ==
Phoenicia Hotel as seen from Beirut's Coastline

Phoenicia Hotel Beirut

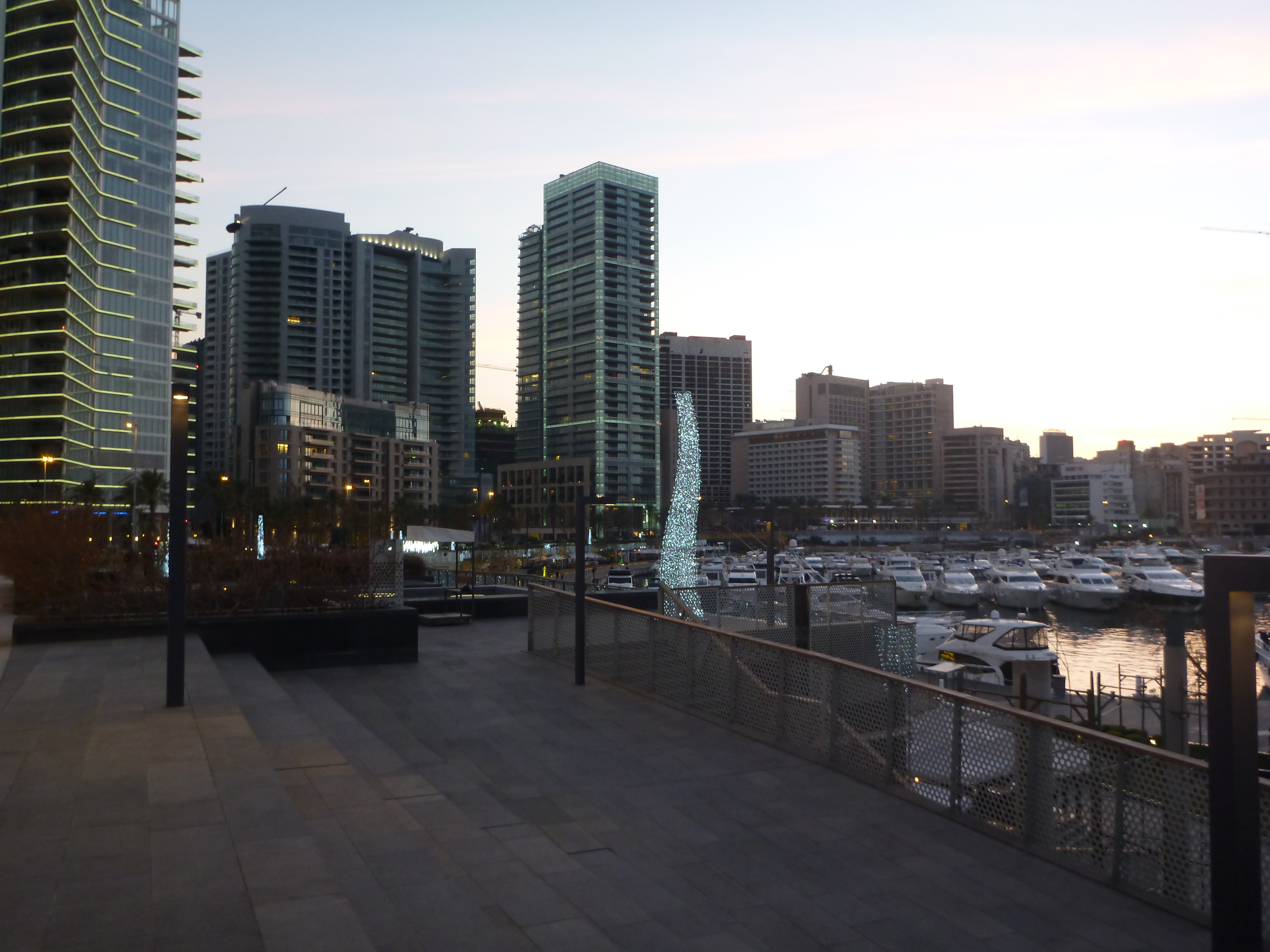
Saint George Bay including the Phoenicia, on the right

== See also ==
- Battle of the Hotels
- Holiday Inn Beirut
- Le Commodore Hotel Beirut
- Lebanese Civil War
