= Battle of the Hotels =

Lebanese Civil War conflict (1975–1976)

Coordinates: 33.90°N 35.50°E

- Part of the Lebanese Civil War
- The partially damaged Holiday Inn Beirut in the hotel district of Beirut, with the Phoenicia in front of it on the right in 2009
Date	23 October 1975 – 2 April 1976
Location	Beirut
Result	Lebanese National Movement victory: Division of Beirut along East-West; Expulsion of Muslim/Leftist militias and civilians from East Beirut; Expulsion of Christian/Rightist militias and civilians from West Beirut; Holiday Inn comes under control of the LNM

Belligerents
Lebanese National Movement; Progressive Socialist Party; Popular Liberation Forces; Lebanese Communist Party; Popular Guard; SSNP-L; Eagles of the Whirlwind; Al-Mourabitoun; Communist Action Organization in Lebanon; Arab Socialist Ba'ath Party of Lebanon; Socialist Arab Lebanon Vanguard Party; Nasserite Correctionist Movement; Amal Movement; Lebanese Resistance Regiments; (Palestine Liberation Organization) PLO; Fatah Movement; PFLP; DFLP; Palestinian Liberation Front; As-Sa'iqa; Lebanese Arab Army	Lebanese Front; Kataeb Party; Kataeb Regulatory Forces; National Liberal Party; Tigers Militia; Marada Brigade; Al-Tanzim; Guardians of the Cedars; Lebanese Youth Movement; Tyous Team of Commandos; Army of Free Lebanon; Lebanese Armed Forces

Commanders and leaders
Kamal Jumblatt; George Hawi; Inaam Raad; Ibrahim Kulaylat; Muhsin Ibrahim; Assem Qanso; Abd al-Rafei; Issam al-Arab; Musa al-Sadr; Yasser Arafat; George Habash; Nayef Hawatmeh; Abu Abbas; Zuheir Mohsen; Ahmed al-Khatib	Pierre Gemayel; Bachir Gemayel; William Hawi; Camille Chamoun; Dany Chamoun; Tony Frangieh; Obad Zouein; Fawzi Mahfouz; Etienne Saqr; Bachir el-Khoury; Joseph Hanna; Saad Haddad; Antoine Barakat; Ibrahim Tannous

Strength
LNM: ~2000; PLO: ~1000; LAA: ~500	LF: ~1,500

Casualties and losses
500 dead and 750 wounded	250 dead and 500 wounded

The Battle of the Hotels (Arabic: معركة الفنادق, Maʿrakah al-Fanādiq) was a subconflict within the 1975–77 phase of the Lebanese Civil War that occurred in the Minet-el-Hosn hotel district of downtown Beirut. This area was one of the first major battles of the war that began in April 1975. The battle was fought for the possession of a small hotel complex, the St. Charles City Center, adjacent to the gilded Corniche seafront area on the Mediterranean, in the north-western corner of the downtown district of Beirut, and it quickly spread to other areas of central Beirut. The often fierce battles that ensued were fought with heavy exchanges of rocket and artillery fire from the various hotel rooftops and rooms. Sniper fire was commonly utilized.

== Background ==
The Battle of the Hotels was a sub-conflict of the Lebanese Civil War that took place in the city's hotel district that involved a number of then-modern high-rises of hotels built during Lebanon's "Golden Age" boom of the mid-to-late 1960s and early 1970s. Among them were the Holiday Inn Beirut on Rue Omar Daouk, the Phoenicia Inter-Continental, the seafront Hotel St. Georges, the Melkart, the Palm Beach, the Excelsior, the Normandy and the Alcazar, some of them were high-rise towers. Not all of the hotels had been completed when the civil war broke out in April 1975. The area, including the Holiday Inn, which opened in 1973, was a symbol of Lebanon's affluence in the period preceding the civil war, an icon in Beirut's rapidly growing landscape. By October 1975, the hotel district became strategically important for fighters in the escalating Lebanese Civil War, because of its proximity to the sea. As Beirut was increasingly divided into West Beirut and East Beirut through 1975 along the Green Line, the Lebanese Front and the Lebanese National Movement (LNM) militias raced to capture the district. Seen by fighters as a strategic military asset, the Holiday Inn in particular soon became a symbolic trophy in the battle, with both sides determined to capture it in an effort to demoralise the other.

The Holiday Inn Beirut was used as a vantage point for militia snipers and was badly damaged

Other tactically valuable, multi-storey buildings in the district included the still-unfinished 30-story Murr Tower (Arabic: برج المر, Burj al-Murr, French: Tour Murr) in the Kantari District and the Rizk Tower, (Arabic: برج رزق الأشرفية, Burj Rizk al-Achrafieh, French: Tour Rizk Achrafieh) in Achrafieh, which were Beirut's tallest buildings at the time. Together with the neighbouring hotels, these buildings towered over the residential quarters in adjacent areas, which included both Christian and Muslim inhabitants. This district had been spared the effects of the ongoing conflict, and most of the hotels were able to continue functioning normally, although with virtually no tourists or holidaymakers.

== The Battle of the Hotels ==
=== October 1975 ===
The first rounds were exchanged on 23 October 1975, during the final phase of the Battle for the Kantari District, when a detachment of fighters – nicknamed the "Hawks of az-Zeidaniyya" (Arabic: صقور الزيدانية | Suqūr az-Zaydānīya, French: Faucons d'az-Zeidaniyya) – from the Al-Mourabitoun, the militia of the Independent Nasserite Movement (INM) led by Ibrahim Kulaylat occupied the empty Murr Tower after they managed to dislodge its Christian Phalange Kataeb Regulatory Forces (KRF) defenders, and began firing rockets and mortars from the upper floors into the Christian-held neighborhoods below. During the battle, the Al-Mourabitoun reportedly committed some 200–300 fighters, though other sources cite a higher number of 500. The majority of the buildings were usually defended by an even smaller number of fighters, with no more than 60 militiamen participating on any given day.

On 26 October, the fighting in Kantari between the Muslim-leftist Lebanese National Movement (LNM) and Christian-rightist Lebanese Front militias spread to the Hotel district. The first hotel/restaurant to be burned down was the Myrtom House, located next to the Haigazian College in the Rue du Mexique. Customers, including three foreign diplomats, and staff were temporarily held hostage and then released, though two employees are still on the missing list.

As a counter-move, Christian fighters of the Phalange KRF militia headed by William Hawi and Bachir Gemayel began to take positions between and around the main hotels, but quickly found themselves at a disadvantage as they were under constant observation and heavy machine gun fire from the Murr Tower. The Phalangists attempted – with little success – to silence and reduce the Murr Tower by directing small-arms fire at it from the Rizk Tower and Achrafieh. On 27 October, backed by a small squadron made up of five homebuilt armored cars, the Phalangists then moved into the Holiday Inn and the Phoenicia, while militiamen of the NLP Tigers Militia headed by Dany Chamoun moved into the Saint-Georges Hotel. A fierce five-day gun-battle between the INM, Phalange and NLP Tigers ensued, in which the Christian militias also attempted to retake the Murr Tower from its Muslim defenders in Kantari without success.

The situation deteriorated further on 28 October, when a shooting incident occurred on the steps of the Parliament House at Nejmeh Square in Christian-controlled territory. One car filled with Muslim militiamen from West Beirut managed to reach the Parliament building and after shouting slogans over a loudspeaker against the members of the Assembly, they opened fire on the deputies leaving the building after attending a parliamentary session. Two men were killed, one being a bodyguard of Phalange Leader Pierre Gemayel. He had been standing nearby at that moment, but was not harmed.

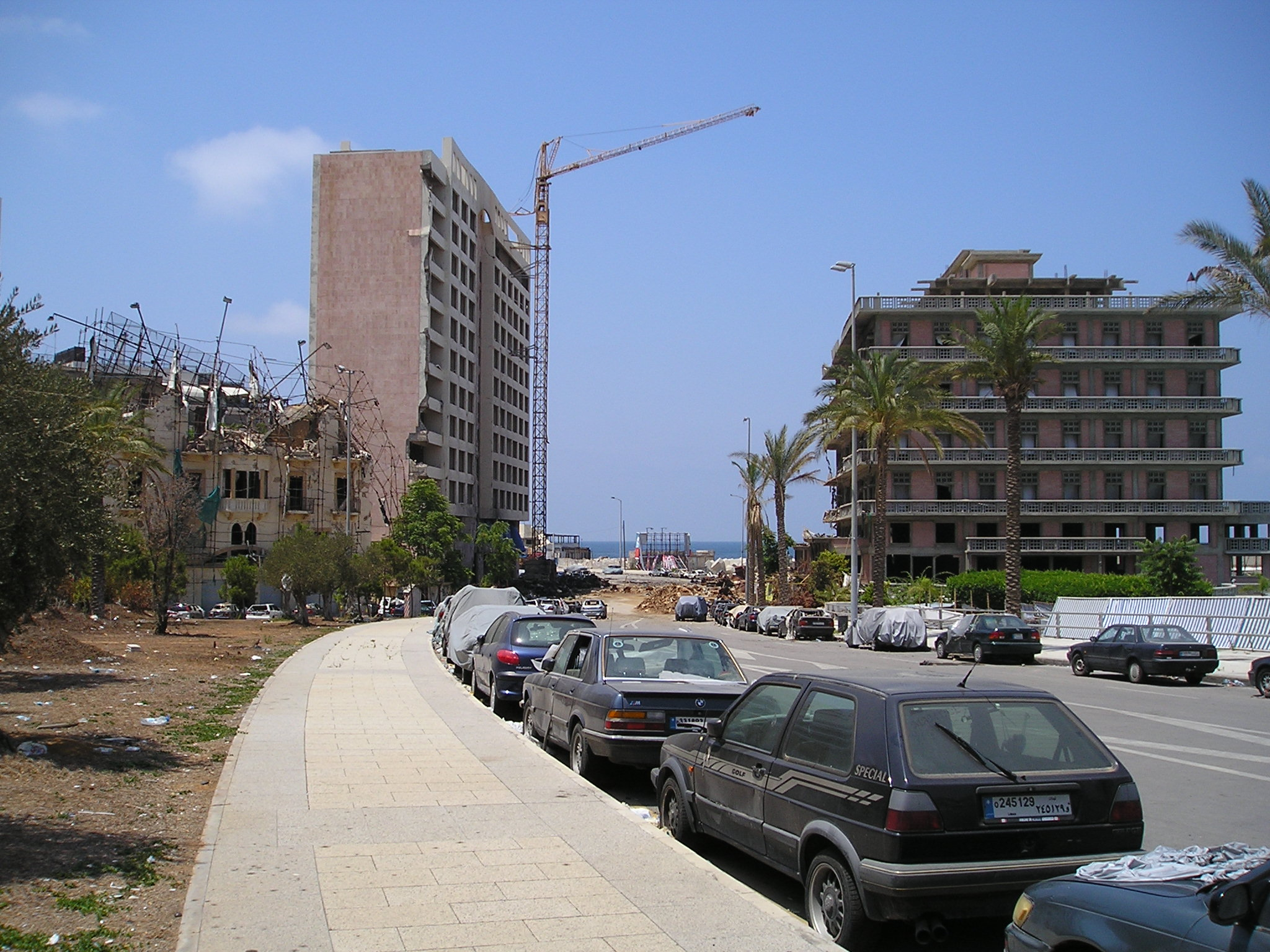
Ruins of the Saint-Georges Hotel, on the right in 2005

Nevertheless, a ceasefire was called upon the belligerents by Prime Minister Rachid Karami on 29 October, in order to allow the evacuation of the staff and residents trapped in the hotels, such as the Holiday Inn, which held more than 200 people, most of them tourists. The evacuation operation was carried out by a motorized Gendarmerie detachment sent by the Internal Security Forces (ISF), using their Chaimite V200 armored cars and loaned M113 and Panhard M3 VTT armored personnel carriers (APCs) by the Lebanese Army, and fighting resumed as soon as the operation had been completed. Another ceasefire was arranged on October 31 to enable the evacuees to return to collect their belongings, if they so wished.

=== November 1975 ===
A new ceasefire came into effect on 3 November. Prime Minister Karami then tried to demilitarise the Hotel district, but the Phalangists and the NLP Tigers refused to vacate their positions at the Holiday Inn, Saint-Georges, Phoenicia Inter-Continental and neighbouring buildings until the Muslim militiamen who occupied the Murr Tower had been replaced by ISF Gendarmes. Although Karami did manage to persuade the Al-Mourabitoun leader Ibrahim Kulaylat to withdraw his fighters from the Murr Tower, no identical move was ever made by the Phalange militiamen who remained at their positions. Another ceasefire was called on 8 November, but it began to break down ten days later as sporadic and occasionally heavy fighting erupted throughout the country. There was, however, little activity in the Hotel district until the following month.

=== December 1975 ===
Despite the nominal ceasefire, hostilities resumed on 8 December when the LNM militias launched a major two-pronged offensive to capture the Christian-held Mediterranean seafront and central Beirut. Units of the Lebanese Army moved into the Parliament House and central post office areas, thus blunting the Muslim-leftist drive toward the city centre. Fighting continued in the Hotel district, however, as the Al-Mourabitoun, with assorted LNM allies and in conjunction with As-Saiqa, attacked the buildings occupied by the Christian militias. In this round of assaults Soviet-made RPG-7 anti-tank rocket launchers and vehicle-mounted 106mm recoilless rifles were employed in the direct fire support role for the first time in Lebanon.

The operation was led by Ibrahim Kulaylat, the Al-Mourabitoun leader, who planned to occupy the district and inflict a crushing defeat on the Phalangist KRF militia that would eventually force them to sue for peace. On 8–9 December there was a seesaw, savage close-quarter battle for the Phoenicia Inter-Continental Hotel, and although the Phalangists were eventually forced out of some of the hotel buildings, they managed to hold on to their main stronghold at the Holiday Inn. When the St Georges fell, the NLP Tigers simply withdrew from the seafront district, leaving the fighting to the Phalangists and the other, smaller Christian militias. On that same date, the Lebanese Army came to the aid of the Phalangists by launching an attack on the Phoenicia and Saint-Georges Hotels, which was initially successful in recapturing the Phoenicia Hotel.

Kulaylat's operation thus failed to deliver the desired results, and on 10 December it was the Muslims who were trying desperately to hold on at the Alcazar Hotel, even though parts of the building had gone up in flames. Pressured by the joint Army-Christian militias' counter-offensive, Kulaylat called the PLO for help and received it. The Phoenicia and St Georges Hotels changed hands several times during the night. Nevertheless, the Muslim militiamen were able to storm and secure the disputed Phoenicia Inter-Continental Hotel, and the next day they mounted another assault against Christian militia and ISF Gendarmerie positions. While the Christian militiamen repulsed the attacks on their own positions, the Gendarmes avoided confrontation and withdrew to the unfinished Beirut Hilton Hotel. The Al-Mourabitoun were forced out from the Saint-Georges and Alcazar Hotels after a heavy artillery bombardment by the Lebanese Army, supported by the Phalangists. Fighting came to a temporary near-halt on 12 December when the exhausted combatants of both sides realised that they had more or less retained their original positions.

Although Prime-Minister Karami had announced another truce two days earlier, it was ignored by the LNM leaders until 11 December. Even on that date, fighting continued on the Hotel district as the Muslim-leftists retook the Phoenicia and Saint-Georges Hotels, forced the Lebanese Army out of the area, and launched an unsuccessful assault on the Phalangist-held Holiday Inn. As a result, the ceasefire called earlier on 10 December did not become truly effective until 15–16 December when Syria, As-Saiqa and the PLO put pressure on the LNM political and military leaders to accept the ceasefire proposal. By nightfall, Lebanese ISF Gendarmerie detachments had replaced Muslim and Christian militiamen in all the hotel positions. A Syrian delegation led by General Hikmat Chehabi arrived in Beirut on 18 December to mediate peace talks between the warring factions, the day in which 40 or 50 bodies were recovered from the Phoenicia Inter-Continental Hotel.

=== January 1976 ===
By late December 1975, fighting in the Battle for the Hotels subsided as the main contenders were distracted elsewhere. On 1 January, the Christian militias set up a blockade cutting off supplies to the Palestinian refugee camp of Tel al-Zaatar and adjacent Muslim-populated districts in East Beirut, which had been reduced to slums by heavy fighting. The Muslim-leftist LNM militias retaliated on 5 January by launching an offensive in the south-eastern sectors of the Lebanese capital, and by 10 January, fighting had spread to the Hotel district as the Phalangists occupied the Holiday Inn and the Muslim-leftists took the Phoenicia. The following day Muslim militiamen moved back to the Murr Tower. No further important changes in control of the Hotel district occurred until the last phase of the battle, though all the contenders managed to maintain their positions thanks to a Syrian-sponsored ceasefire called later on 22 January. The Saint-Georges Hotel would suffer heavy damage throughout January 1976 as a result of high-intensity attacks fired at the complex.

=== March 1976 ===
The Hotel district flared up again on 17 March, the day when the LNM-PLO joint forces, backed by the Lebanese Arab Army (LAA) – a predominately Muslim splinter faction of the official Lebanese Army led by the dissident Lieutenant Ahmed al-Khatib – launched an all-out offensive against rightist positions in central Beirut. Then on 21 March, a major assault by special Palestinian PLO 'Commando' units using armored vehicles lent by the LAA and supported by the leftist-Muslim militias – including the "Maarouf Saad Units and the Determination brigade" (Arabic: معروف معروف وحدات ولواء تقرير, Merouf Maeruf Wahadat wa Liwa' Taqrir, French: Unités Maarouf Saad et la brigade de la détermination) from the Al-Mourabitoun – finally managed to dislodge the Christian-rightist Kataeb Regulatory Forces (KRF) from the Holiday Inn. Nonetheless, the leftist militiamen who had been handed the hotel by the Palestinians for propaganda purposes got so carried away celebrating that they did not clear all the hotel rooms, which allowed the Phalangists to sneak back in at dawn the next morning and set up an ambush that killed a key Al-Mourabitoun militia commander.

Having only been in control of the Holiday Inn for a few hours, the Palestinians therefore had to do the job all over again, and on 22 March, leftist-Muslim LNM forces backed by PLO guerrillas mounted a counter-attack in downtown Beirut, determined to eliminate any remaining Phalangist presence west of the Martyrs' Square. Over the next two days and amid intense shelling, the Phalange were gradually pushed back to their defensive positions at Martyrs' Square and Rue Allenby, after a costly battle that resulted in 150 dead and 300 wounded. The following day, 23 March, the Al-Mourabitoun recaptured the Holiday Inn and the area known as the "4th sector" or "4th district" (Arabic: المقاطعه الرابعه, Al-hayi al-ra'abie, French: 4ème secteur) from the Phalangists, which meant that LNM militias now dominated most of the strategic points around central Beirut. That same day marked the beginning of the battle for the Beirut port area when the LNM-PLO forces advanced towards that sector and captured the Starco building. Five days later, on 28 March, they seized control of the Hilton and Normandy Hotels. The new battle front was established on the axis Starco-Hilton, while Phalangist militiamen faced assaults launched from the Riad El Solh Square and the Nejmeh Square towards the Port area and the Rue de Damas.

Although the Christians had virtually lost the control of the Hotel district, it was not quite the end of the fighting in downtown Beirut. As the weeks went by, it was becoming painfully apparent to the Lebanese Front leadership that they were at risk of losing the war as the LNM-PLO-LAA alliance forced them to retreat farther into East Beirut. To counter this threat, the Lebanese Front finally agreed to form a "Unified Command" (Arabic: القيادة الموحدة | Al-Qiadat al-Muahada, French: Commande unifiée) for the Christian rightist militias headed by Pierre Gemayel, who issued an appeal to his supporters to rally to the defense of the Christian areas. Thus by 26 March, the Kataeb Regulatory Forces alone were able to mobilize some 18,000 fighters to defend the eastern sector of the Lebanese Capital and the upper Matn District.

The new Christian Command felt it imperative to retain control of Beirut's port district and began raising an elaborate defence barricade made of concrete and rubble at Rue Allenby. As the allied 'Lebanese Front' militia forces tried to stave off the Muslim-Leftist-Palestinian assault on the port district, units of the predominantly Christian Army of Free Lebanon (AFL) – another ex-Lebanese Army dissident faction led by the right-wing Maronite Colonel Antoine Barakat – now entered the fray. Officers and enlisted men from the AFL's Fayadieh barracks in south-east Beirut came to the aid of their beleaguered co-religionists, bringing with them much-needed armored vehicles and heavy artillery. During the fighting, however, an artillery barrage fired by a unit under Barakat's command accidentally struck the campus of the American University of Beirut (AUB) at Rue Bliss in the neighboring Ras Beirut district, causing a number of casualties among the students. The LNM-PLO advance was finally stopped on 31 March at Rue Allenby, and after Syria threatened to cut the arms shipments to the Muslim factions, both the LNM and Lebanese Front leaders agreed to a ceasefire, which came into effect on 2 April. The Battle of the Hotels was over. Shortly after the battle ended, hordes of scavengers entered the Hotel district and stripped down the hotel buildings of all valuables left inside them, with items such as beds, silver spoons and curtains from the Holiday Inn making their way onto Beirut's wartime black market.

== Consequences ==
The battle of the hotels and assorted conflicts provided valuable, if costly, lessons to all sides. The Lebanese Front leadership had grossly underestimated the military strength and organizational capabilities displayed by the Leftist-Muslim LNM coalition and their Palestinian allies in Lebanon, as well as the political and logistical support they would receive from some Arab countries. For their part, the Lebanese National Movement leaders had also underestimated the military capabilities and mobilization skills of their Rightist-Christian Lebanese Front alliance adversaries, and the military support that they enjoyed from certain fractions of the Lebanese Army and Israel.

Although the Lebanese Front was eventually kicked out of West Beirut, providing a victory for the LNM, the ensuing chaos following the battle only served to complete the division of Beirut into a Muslim-controlled western sector (known as "West Beirut") and a Christian-dominated eastern sector (known in turn as "East Beirut") through a demarcation line that eventually became the Green Line, and this partition remained for the following 15 years. The battle would be intensely televised, with pictures of the Holiday Inn burning in December 1975 sending shockwaves around the world. The ferocity of the fighting in what had been an affluent country would result in a significant blow to Lebanon's reputation as a tourist destination and resulted in Beirut being abandoned and neglected by foreign investors scared by the war. The intensity of the fighting, previously unseen in Lebanon, would also result in more severe battles taking place throughout the war.

== In arts and popular culture ==
=== Cinema ===
In Circle of Deceit (1981) Volker Schlöndorff makes an ambiguous use of the Phoenicia InterContinental Hotel, one of the hotels involved in the battle. Characters seem to be lodging in the hotel while it has already been damaged by the war. In fact, the outside scenes were shot on location, while the interior scenes were done at Casino du Liban.

=== Visual arts ===
Lebanese painter Ayman Baalbaki painted the Holiday Inn Beirut, a landmark of this battle. His Holiday Inn Hotel 'Seeking The Heights’ was sold for $47,500 at a Christie's auction in 2010.

Lebanese visual artist and illustrator Lamia Ziadé exhibited in 2008 Hotel's War, an installation of wool and fabric childlike models of buildings that makes a reference to the Battle of the Hotels.

A scale model of the unfinished shell of the Burj al-Murr, a prominent sniper nest during the war, was crafted by Lebanese artist Marwan Rechmaoui. The piece is entitled Monument for the Living and is on display at the Tate Modern museum in London.

=== Music ===
Lebanese singer-songwriter and architecture researcher Mayssa Jallad dedicated an album to the Battle of the Hotels. Published in March 2023, Marjaa: The Battle Of The Hotels tells these historical events through lyricised descriptions, sometimes narrated from the perspective of the buildings themselves.

== See also ==
- Hundred Days' War
- List of extrajudicial killings and political violence in Lebanon
- Internal Security Forces
- Lebanese Army
- Lebanese Civil War
- Lebanese Front
- Lebanese National Movement
- Le Commodore Hotel Beirut
- Mountain War (Lebanon)
- Philip Caputo
