= Holiday Inn Beirut =

Ruined hotel building in Beirut

Coordinates: 33.8997°N 35.4951°E

Holiday Inn Beirut, 2014

The Holiday Inn Beirut is a ruined high rise hotel in Beirut, Lebanon on Omar Daouk Street in the central Minet el Hosn neighborhood of the north-western corner of the downtown district of Beirut overlooking the Corniche seafront area on the Mediterranean Sea. The hotel operated for less than a year, before closing when the Lebanese Civil War broke out in 1975.

== History ==
The hotel was constructed between 1971 and 1974 by Lebanese developer Abdal Mohsin Kattan and designed by French architect André Wogenscky, working with Lebanese architect Maurice Hindié. The 26-storey hotel included a revolving restaurant on the top floor, a nightclub on the 25th floor, and 400 guest rooms. It was part of a mixed-use complex known as St. Charles City Center, including a cinema, offices, shops, restaurants, a supermarket. It was constructed on the site of the Hospital St Charles, which had been founded by the German religious order of Saint Charles Borromeo in 1908, but had moved to Baabda, north of Beirut, in 1963. The Holiday Inn opened in 1974, at the height of Beirut's economic boom, when the city was the glamorous tourist center of the Middle East.

The Holiday Inn operated normally for only a year before the Lebanese Civil War broke out in 1975. The hotel became the focal point of a war zone beginning on October 25, 1975, in a months-long conflict known as the Battle of the Hotels, as over 25,000 combatants from pro-Palestinian and Christian militias fought for control of a group of towering luxury hotels including the Holiday Inn and the adjacent Phoenicia Inter-Continental, resulting in over 1,000 deaths (many of those who died were thrown from the top of the Holiday Inn) and 2,000 injuries. The hotel was seen as a heavily symbolic goal by both sides in the conflict, and fighting for it was fierce, finally ending on March 21, 1976.

After the battle, the ruined hotel was stripped to its concrete skeleton by scavengers. It became a battleground again during the 1982 Lebanon War between Al-Mourabitoun and Amal fighters. Since then, the hotel has remained a gutted, bullet-riddled ruin, looming over the city. The ownership of the structure is split. The Lebanese company that owns half of it, Compagnie Immobiliere Libanaise, wants to renovate it and convert it to condos, while the Kuwaiti group that owns the other half wants to demolish it and construct a new tower on the site.

As a result of the disagreement, it remains empty and untouched, decades after the war and its brief year of operation. Due to its strategic location in Beirut's city centre, the ruined hotel and its immediate surrounding ground level areas have been declared a military zone, and the structure is under the control of the Lebanese Army, which currently restricts access to civilians.

== See also ==
- Battle of the Hotels
- Le Commodore Hotel Beirut
- Lebanese Civil War
