= Daouk =

Daouk or Al Daouk or Ad Daouk is a common Arabic family name. Notable people with the surname include:

- Daouk Family, Arabic family name
- Ahmad Daouk, former Lebanese Prime Minister in 1941-1942 and in 1960
- Hazem Daouk, financial economist
- Walid Daouk (born 1958), Lebanese politician and minister
- Tarik El-Daouk, Lebanese Business Entrepreneur and Engineer
- Feras El-Daouk, Lebanese Business Entrepreneur and Consultant
- Hasan El-Daouk, Lebanese Business Entrapeneur notably his printing factory, and a prominent Muezzin in the Shatila Mosque and Imam Ali Mosque in Beirut
