= Palestinian women artists =

Palestinian women artists are artists who identify as Palestinian and live in the West Bank, Gaza Strip or Palestinian diaspora.

Some common themes used by Palestinian women artists include references to land, refugee status, and the body.

== Themes ==
=== Homeland ===
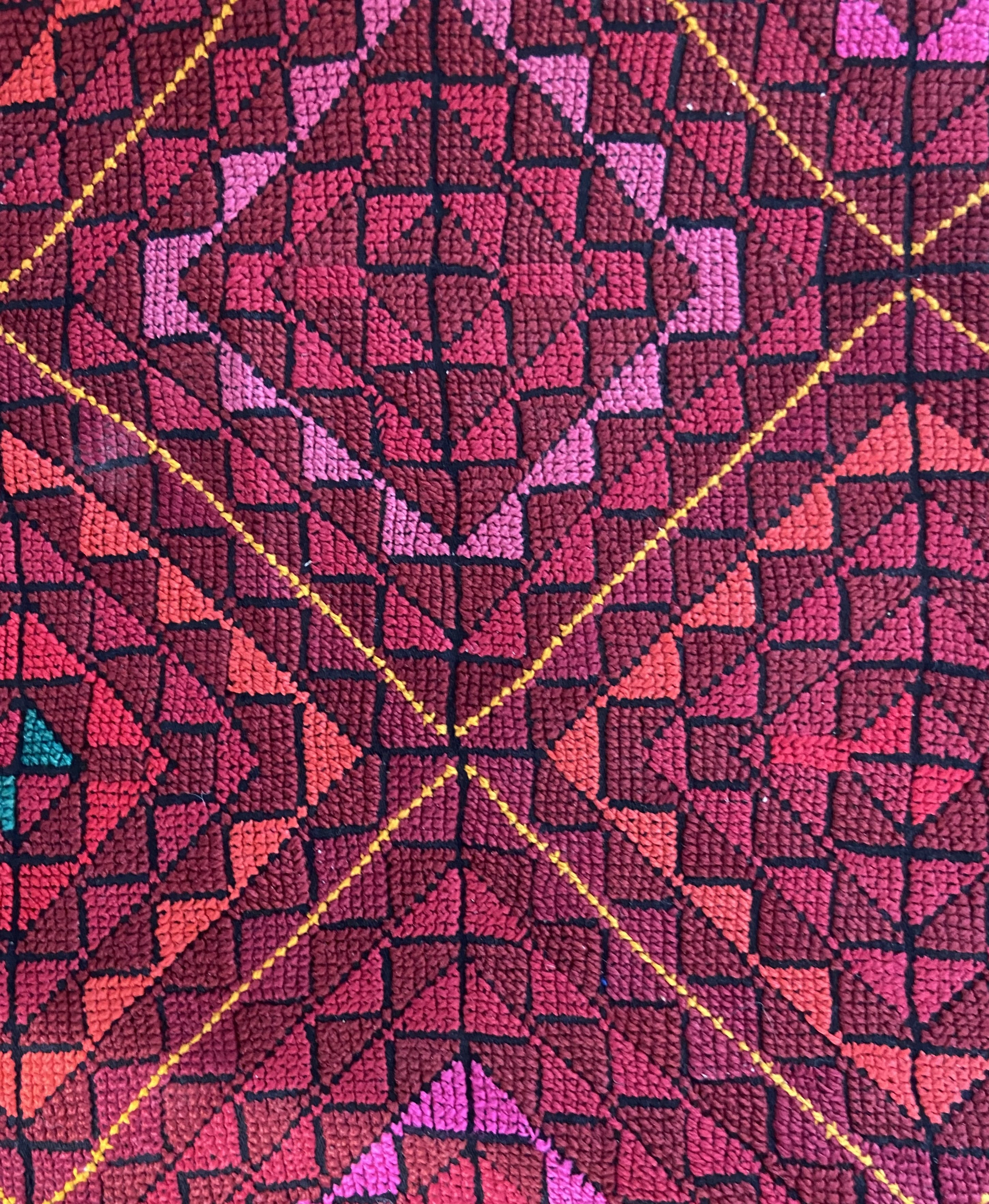
Tatreez embroidery from Beersheba Dress

The art of Palestinian women artists connects to their homeland. Whether it is the river, the sea or the desert, landscape is critical in the artists’ work. Women artists in refugee camps mostly used their artistic talents to create traditional tatreez embroidery with motifs of their hometown.

For Palestinians, art becomes a means of reclaiming their homeland lost to exile. Artists Jumana al-Husseini and Juliana Seraphim exemplify this, by each having distinct artistic styles but the same approach in their idealization of Jerusalem. Through their work, they represent their lost capital, offering glimpses into a city that exists in memory. Jumana al-Husseini's art often blends abstraction with elements of Islamic architecture, emphasizing the designs and colors of Jerusalem. Al-Husseini's use of geometric art and textures creates pieces that are both modern and traditional. On the other hand, Juliana Seraphim's surrealist paintings explore themes of displacement, using symbolism to represent the homeland's impact on identity. Her work encapsulates exile, portraying the pain of separation as well as the hope for return. In both cases, their art goes further than personal experiences, reflecting broader narratives of Palestinian identity and heritage.

=== Refugee status ===
Refugee status has deeply shaped the experiences of Palestinian women artists, who use their work to preserve memory and express the pain of exile. Since the 1948 Nakba, Palestinians have faced displacement, losing their homes and identities. Artists like Laila Kassab reflect these struggles in their art, capturing both trauma and resilience. Laila Kassab, a self-taught artist from Rafah refugee camp, describes art as her "passport to the world." She often uses birds as symbols of freedom and inner peace, which is considered "difficult to achieve in my country – subjected to successive wars". Women also appear frequently in her paintings, representing their homeland or the "good land". In her work "Prisoner of Life," Kassab portrays a woman with green hair, resting her head on her hand while a dove perches on her arm. The dove symbolizes her desire for freedom. Kassab says the vivid colors and forms express her feelings of being "robbed of her childhood" and "oppressed as a woman" in Gaza. This painting was inspired by Ahed Tamimi, a young activist who was arrested for resisting the Israeli occupation. Kassab's use of color is symbolic. "Warm and cold colors... blend together to express the life of refuge and diaspora that my people live," she explains. Despite the challenges of living in Gaza, Kassab continues to create and share her art globally. She often struggles to get materials, noting that "sometimes I do not find my favorite colors available in Gaza" or cannot afford them. Yet, she says, "I try hard not to stop drawing," even painting with makeup after her studio was destroyed in the 2012 war. She characterizes her artwork as having "already penetrated the siege".

=== Body ===
A key aspect of art from women in Palestine is the imagery of the female body, motherhood and its connection to the land. Often in Palestinian art, women "represent motherhood, fertility, and homeland… She is the one who raises the generations. She is the one who shares the dreams of the man". Photographer Faten Fawzy Nastas represents imprisonment in her works “Scream” (2000), in which a plaster sculpture of a woman is imprisoned between two metal windows, and "God Have Mercy" (2018) which shows the wall that keeps Palestinians confined.

Related to imprisonment is the autonomy that women have over their bodies. This is represented in the collages of Jumana Emil ‘Abboud such as in her work, “I Feel Nothing” (2012). The work shows a woman's bare body, without any hands in a mountain of dismembered limbs. Manar Hassan also boldly depicts women's sexuality in her works as well as Hanan Abu Hussein who in her work, stretches the proportions of female breasts and feet. Writer, poet, and painter ‘Aida Nasrallah depicts women bare, vulnerable, and connected to the land. The woman’s body itself is often the figurative representation of Palestine and thinking of Palestine as "Mother". Nasrallah uses images like wheat and fields of oats in her paintings with naked women representing their bare and inherent connection to nature. Leila Shawa uses breast cancer as a metaphor for all of the destruction that the physical land of Palestine is undergoing from the atomic bombing and bulldozing.

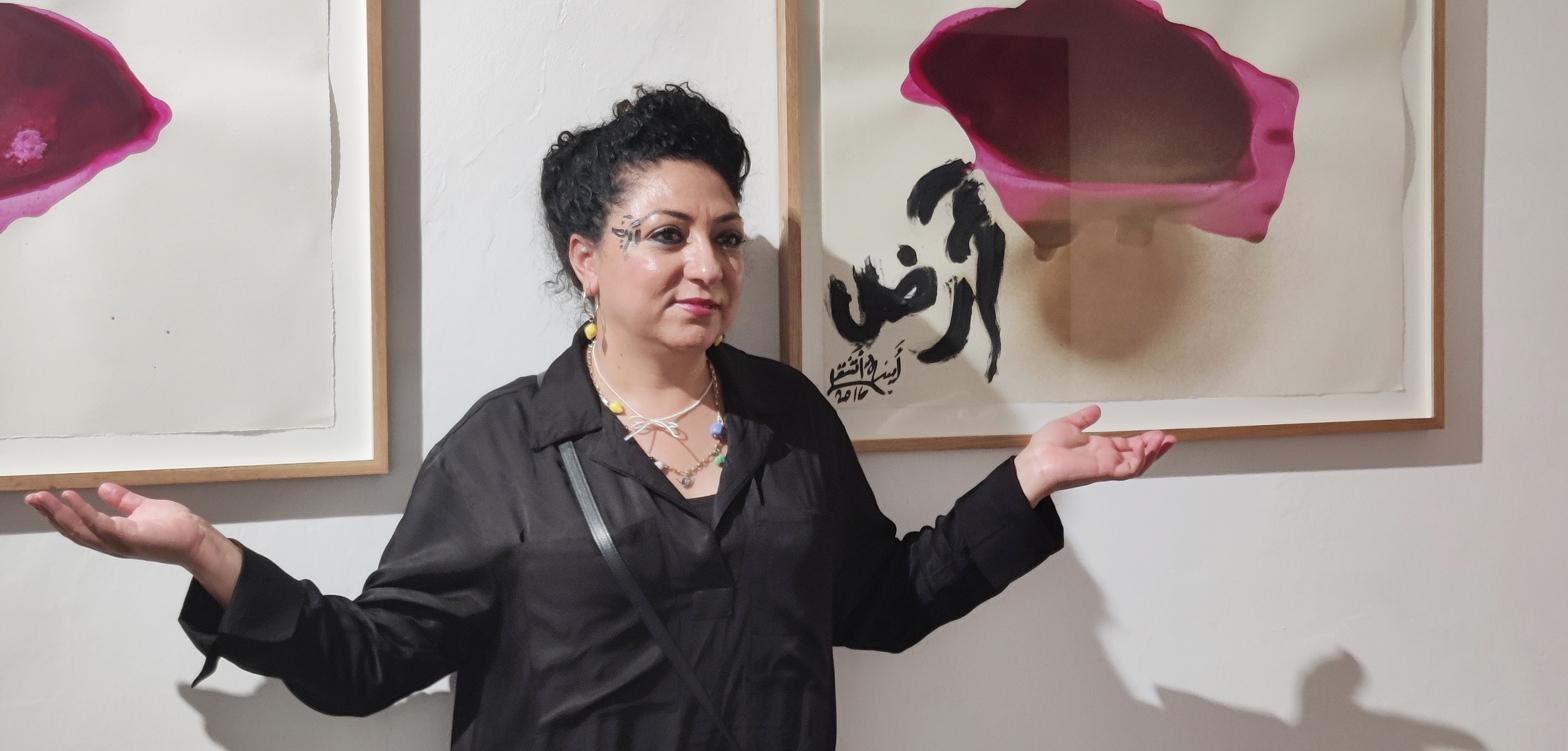
"Anisa Ashkar 01" by Talmoryair. Ashkar with her work.

Artists such as Anisa Ashkar play off of the common use of female bodies as representing the Palestinian homeland to further develop the use of female figures in Palestinian art. Her performance piece, In the Twinkle of an Eye, is a 15-minute dance interpretation of the Medusa myth in which, “Anisa Ashkar perceives of herself: beautiful and dark, strong and bright, sovereign and in total control of her destiny” (Aviv).

== Symbols ==
Common symbols in Palestinian women's art include keffiyehs, oranges, olive branches, doves, religious symbols, the colors of the Palestinian flag (red, black, green, and white), watermelons, and women themselves.

Jumana Emil ‘Abboud uses the Virgin Mary to represent the similar struggles between her and Palestinian women. Tamam Al-Akhal uses the horse as representation for the holy land in her painting, “Jerusalem”. In Tamam Al-Akhal's painting "The Witness", the landscape is represented by doves, a symbol of peace, sitting on barbed wire while a baby crawls out of the rubble. Graffiti artist Laila Ajjawi covers her work in symbols such as keffiyehs, olive branches, the Palestinian flag, and doves.

== Abstraction ==
Female Palestinian artists who explore abstraction in their work express common cultural, social, and political themes to get their messages across to their audience. According to an article by San Diego Libguides, “surrealism and abstraction began to be used more by Palestinian artists, often searching for a new way to express life under occupation while broadening their discipline”.

Jumana Emil ‘Abboud uses drawings, videos, performances, objects and texts to navigate themes of memory, loss and resilience. By referencing familiar images ranging from the Virgin Mary and Pharaonic figures to different kinds of abstract acrylic art, 'Abboud addresses themes of femininity and cultural memory. For example, in her acrylic painting "The Unbearable Halfness of Being," her colourwashed painting represents Palestinians in ways that preserves memory, using symbols that represent different types of water sources, such as streams or rivers to connect to their homeland. According to ‘Abboud, “for thousands of years, the natural landscape we lived in in Palestine was a terrain of enchantment. The natural water source– spring, well, stream– was such a terrain, inhabited by spirits, good and bad. I like to refer to such waters as spirited sites". Her work forces her audience to recognize and realize the reality of the impact ethnic cleansing has on Palestinian culture. Additionally, her sketches of human bodies serve as critiques of stereotypes on women, particularly of female pleasure, as seen in her focus on the clitoris as a symbol of autonomy.

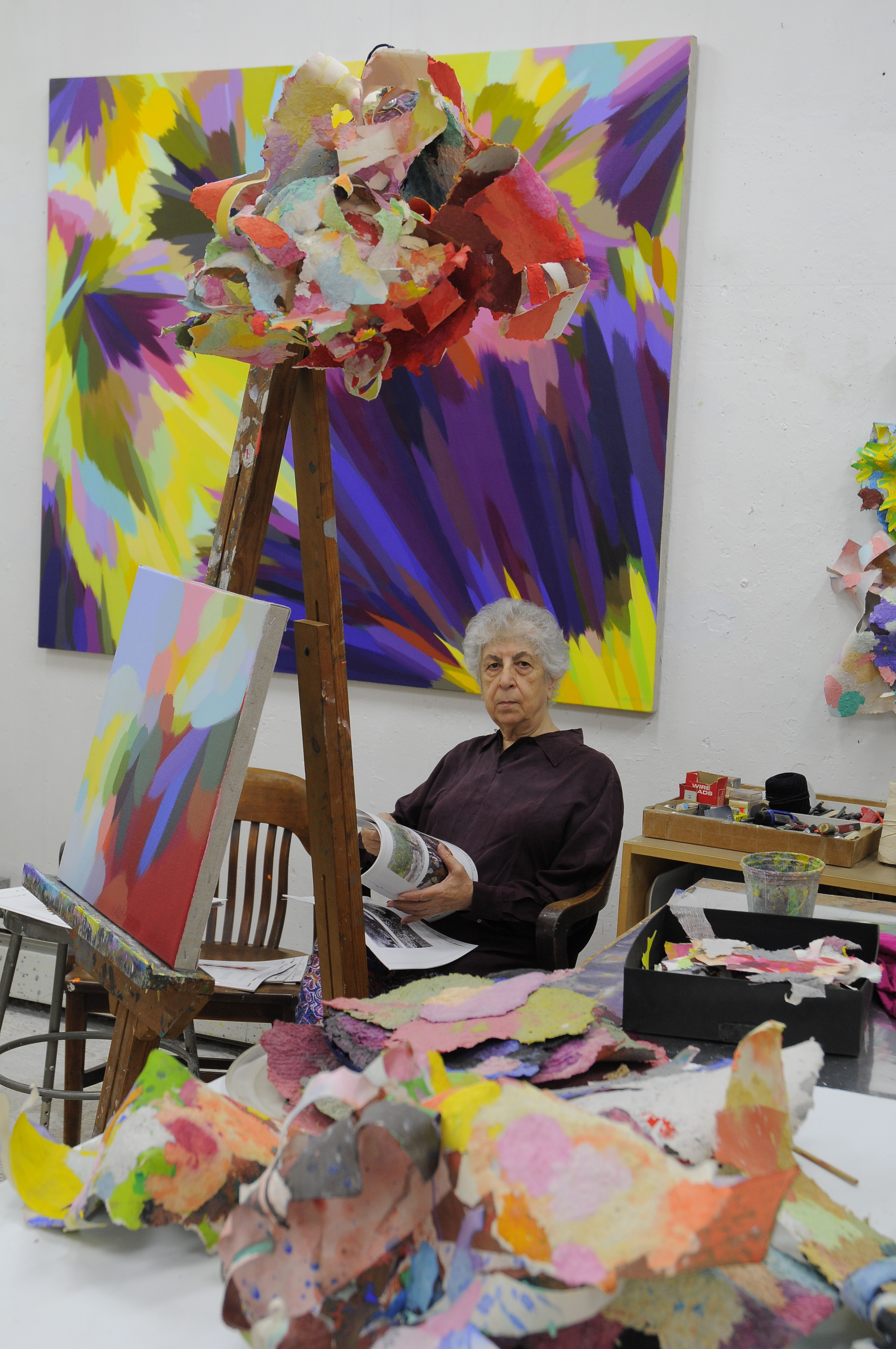
Halaby 2016" by Lbalbalba11122

Likewise, Juliana Seraphim sought to examine the inner self. Seraphim's art ranges from the erotic illustrations in the novella A Vessel of Tenderness to the Moon to her complex, mystifying untitled etchings on paper creates a fantastical atmosphere. Her work challenges social norms and defies reality in an attempt to explore the self in a more spiritual sense. Other artists, like Samia Halaby, hope to retake abstract art from western hegemony by indirectly criticizing capitalist art. Overall, 'Abboud, Seraphim, Halaby, and many other Palestinian women artists who use abstraction offer complex representations of themes surrounding self examination, sexual stereotypes, and the female body.

== Contemporary ==
Contemporary Palestinian women artists seek to free the female form from sexual, artistic, and cultural oppression. Anisa Ashkar's work represents the female being through domestic supplies, the body, and sensorial themes while portraying the male being as a speech oriented, highly rational figure. This power dynamic is then slowly overturned throughout the course of the performance through her deprecating portrayal of an Israeli man. Although most artists like Ashkar do not create their art specifically to oppose traditional notions in preceding works, there is a clear sense of combat between these works and the concepts of masculinity and femininity. Ashkar's work seeks to give a symbolic power to the victimized character in her choreography, exploring the power of femininity through unity in masses.

Oftentimes, artists challenge old methods of representation in order to convey their messages in nuanced ways. Israeli-Palestinian dancer Sahar Damoni explores themes of the female body, pleasure, and sexuality through her choreography. While these themes are very common in art, Damoni simultaneously refuses the highly racialized and sexualized themes of common choreography that explores these topics. Many women artists wish to reclaim the female body from the hypersexualized culture of male-dominated artistic spaces. Pleasure represented as not just sexual, but a deep spiritual satisfaction seeks to challenge social power structures and further empower the female being.

Being confined within Israeli restrictions births new methods of portraying national identity in the work of women artists. Contemporaries carry on the legacy of Palestinian art with their subtle, yet effective political messaging through the uses of national colors, resistance symbols, and themes of perseverance. Artists like Manal Mahamid explore the Palestinian landscape and colonial resistance in unique ways. Often depicting national identity through natural symbols such as Palestinian Gazelles. Along with her depictions of women, nothing about Mahamid's work is blatantly political, yet it continues to uphold Palestinian identity and culture, a common method in Palestinian art as a whole.

== Woman artists in the diaspora ==
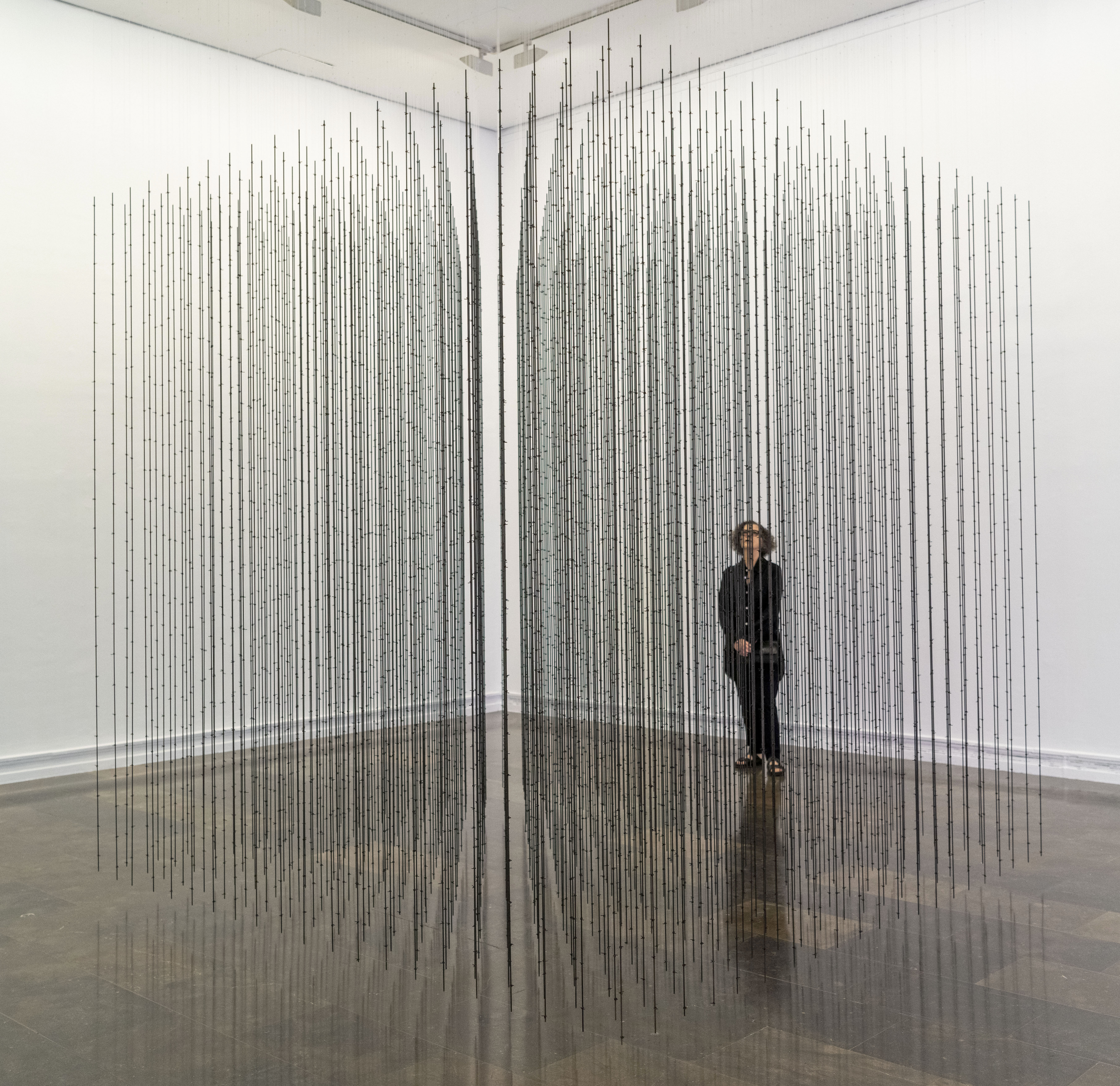
Impenetrable by Mona Hatoum

There are also many women Palestinian artists working in the diaspora such as Iraqi based visual artist and filmmaker, Nadia Awad. Awad's films highlight the struggles of queer people in Palestine and people living with HIV. Palestinian American filmmaker and visual artist Emily Jacir’s exhibit “Where We Come From” explores the longing of returning to the homeland of Palestinians in the diaspora and the complexities of being able to travel freely with an American passport. Britain based photographer, Larissa Sansour explores themes of generational trauma in families and photographs bombs that have landed in Palestine as well as other archeological artifacts. She works in many mediums. Beirut-born, London-based multimedia installation artist Mona Hatoum explores displacement and feelings of exile and loss caused by war for people in the diaspora. Samia Halaby was born in Jerusalem in 1936 and moved to the United States due to the Nakba and lived there for the rest of her life as a pioneer for abstract art.

Due to its cultural importance, several displaced Palestinian women artists spent their careers in Beirut. Juliana Seraphim and Jumana al-Husseini are two of these artists. Due to their displacement, the memory of home strongly influenced both of their works, specifically the image of Jerusalem. Overall, displacement creates abstraction in the image of homeland in the works of Palestinian women artists. Despite relocation, these Palestinian artists continue to draw on their homeland for inspiration.

== See also ==
- List of Palestinian women artists
