= Sinno =

Sinno may refer to:

- Sinni (river)
- sinno family (Lebanese Family)
