= Crazy Horse (Beirut) =

Coordinates: 33.900738°N 35.4840898°E

The Crazy Horse is a cabaret venue on the Rue de Phénicie in Beirut, Lebanon. Named after the Parisian cabaret Crazy Horse, it was an infamous nightclub during the 1960s and 1970s when it was both a bar and a brothel, and considered the most outrageous of Beirut’s nightlife establishments. The venue, which was also known for its revues, was large, accommodating hundreds of tables, and the high ceiling was decorated with crystal chandeliers. Members of Lebanese and European high society, the rich and glitzy, along with politicians, spies, Arab sheikhs, and tourists mingled with the hostesses, dancers and prostitutes, making The Crazy Horse the highpoint of Beirut’s club scene by 1974. According to Adam Robinson, the author of Bin Laden: behind the mask of the terrorist, Osama bin Laden frequented the cabaret when he was a student at Brummana High School in Lebanon.

== See also ==
- Ras Beirut
