= George Post =

George Post may refer to:

- George Post (painter) (1906–1997), American watercolorist
- George B. Post (1837–1913), American Beaux-Arts architect
- George M. Post (1883–1966), American architect in Oregon
- George Adams Post (1854–1925), U.S. Representative from Pennsylvania
- George Edward Post (1838–1909), professor of surgery at the Syrian Protestant College in Beirut
- Rue George Post, a street in Beirut, Lebanon
