= Minet ed Dhalia point =

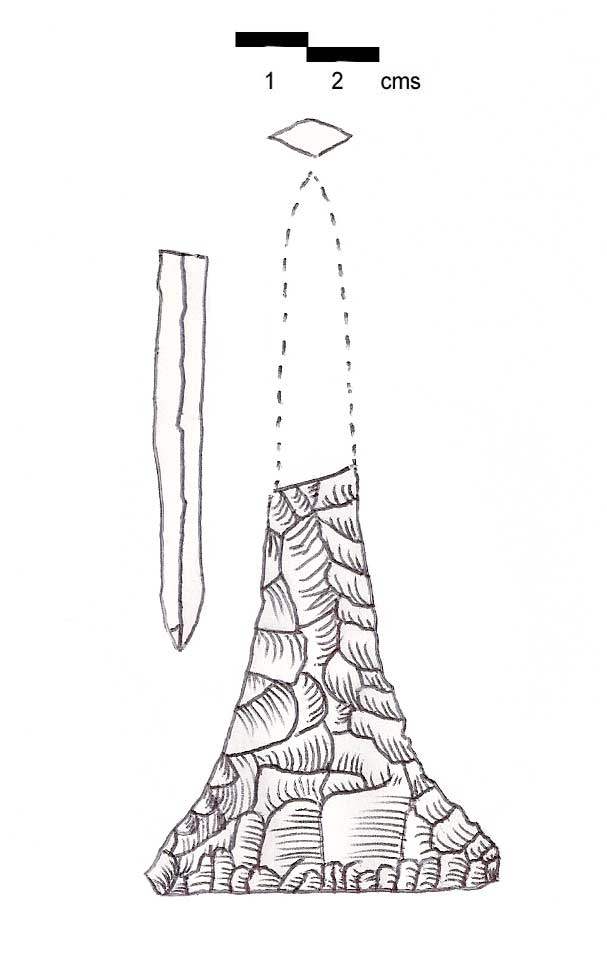
Minet ed Dhalia point. Also called a "stylet". Discovered at Shemlan. White patinated flint.

A Minet ed Dhalia point or stylet is an archaeological term for an elongated, isosceles triangle made with pressure flaking on both faces of a piece of flint. They are predominantly found at sites in Lebanon (ancient Canaan). They are the type tool of the Énéolithique Ancien (Ancient Chalcolithic), named after the archaeological site of Minet ed Dhalia in Ras Beirut. The stylets range from 2 inches (5.1 cm) to 8 inches (20 cm) in length. They were first observed by Dawson in 1884 and later by Godefroy Zumoffen in 1910 and called "stylets" by Raoul Describes. The exact use of Minet ed Dhalia points is uncertain although the shape bears certain similarities to metal fleshing tools used in the area in modern times.
