= Rue Jeanne d'Arc =

Street in Beirut, Lebanon

Rue Jeanne d'Arc is a street in Beirut, Lebanon, named in honor of Joan of Arc, one of the patron saints of France. By 1919, Rue Jeanne d'Arc was one of the main arteries that radiated from Bliss Street and by 1930, the urbanization of the street had reached 35%.

Rue Jeanne d'Arc runs north-south, beginning at Bliss Street, intersecting Hamra Street and ending at Al Hussein. The street is known for many 1970s hotels, such as Casa d'Or, as well as many flower shops.

== See also ==
- Ras Beirut
