= Ras Beirut =

Neighborhood in Beirut, Lebanon

- Location within Beirut
- Coordinates: 33.9°N 35.48°E
- Country: Lebanon

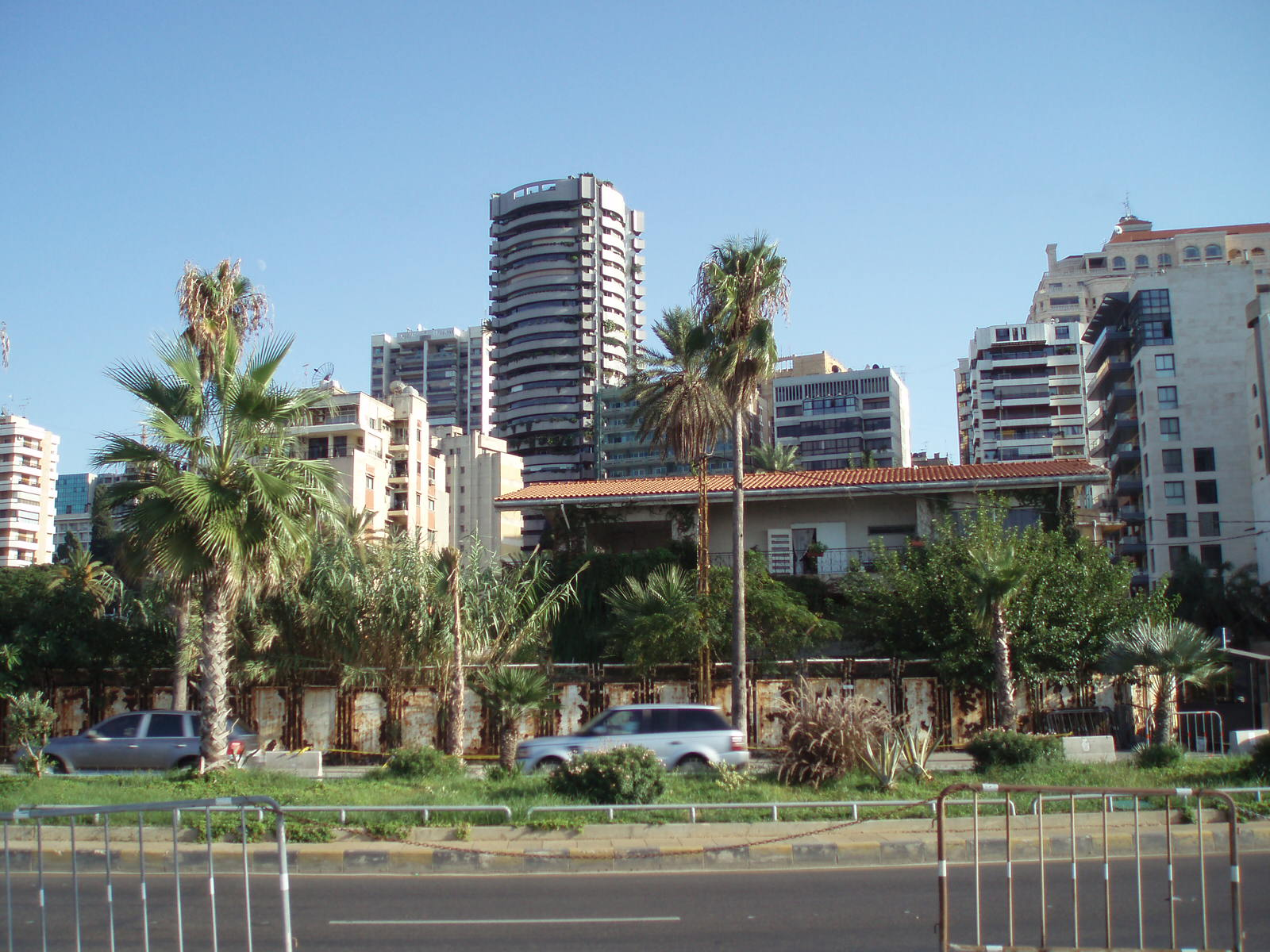
Manara neighbourhood in Ras Beirut

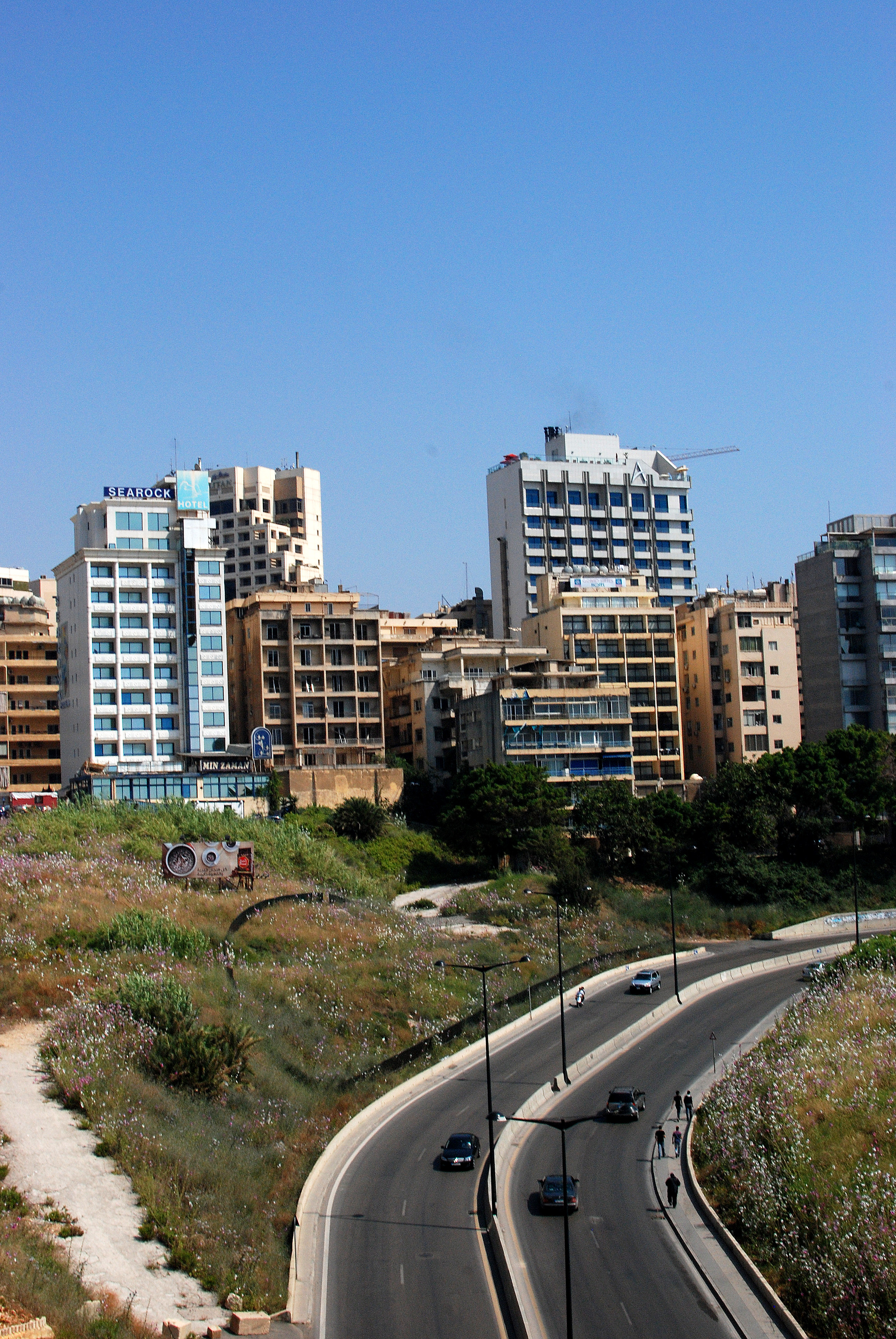

Ras Beirut (Arabic: رأس بيروت, lit. 'tip of Beirut') is an upscale residential neighborhood in Beirut, Lebanon. It has a mixed population of Christians, Muslims and Druze, and is associated with nonsectarian relations between members of the groupings.

Ras Beirut is home to some of Beirut's historically prominent families, such as the Bekhazi family, the Rebeiz family, the Daouk family, the Itani family, the Sinno family, and the Sidani family, the Beyhum family and others. Included in the area are a number of international schools and universities, including the American University of Beirut (AUB) and International College Beirut (IC).

== Archaeology ==
In 1946, the archaeologist and priest Henri Fleisch from Saint Joseph University made an unstratified, open-air survey of the marine terraces of Ras Beirut, and recovered various artifacts. Flints have also been recovered by walkers on the nearby beaches. The area is separated from the Sands of Beirut sites by the Wadi Abu Chahine or "South Creek" which begins south of the Continental Hotel area. It is an important site for Quaternary studies and has been published in various works by Fleisch, Auguste Bergy in 1932, L. Dubertret in 1940 and 1948, Wright in 1960 and 1962, Raoul Describes in 1921, Dorothy Garrod in 1960 and R. Neuville in 1933. Stratified sites are numbered in chronological order with unstratified sites at the end. The first four sites contain stratified Lower Paleolithic industries from the 45 metres (148 ft) beach level, the next five are stratified Middle Paleolithic with a gap in stratified sites to the Chalcolithic found at site XI. Intervening periods including the Levalloiso-Mousterian were well represented in surface finds along with a substantial amount of Neolithic material on a 45 metres (148 ft) terrace. Collections are held in the American University of Beirut and the Museum of Lebanese Prehistory. Many of the sites have been built on and completely destroyed by urbanisation.

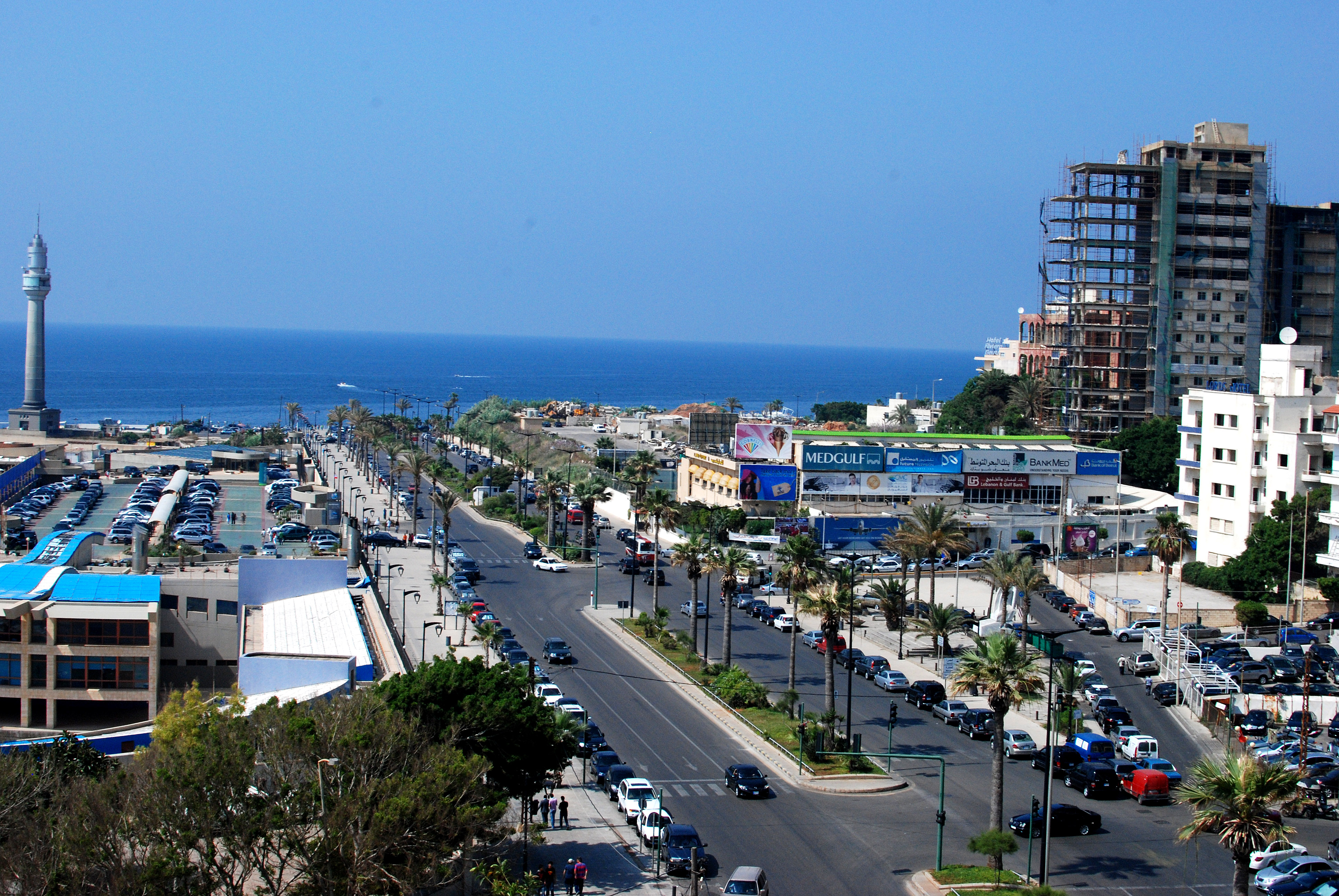

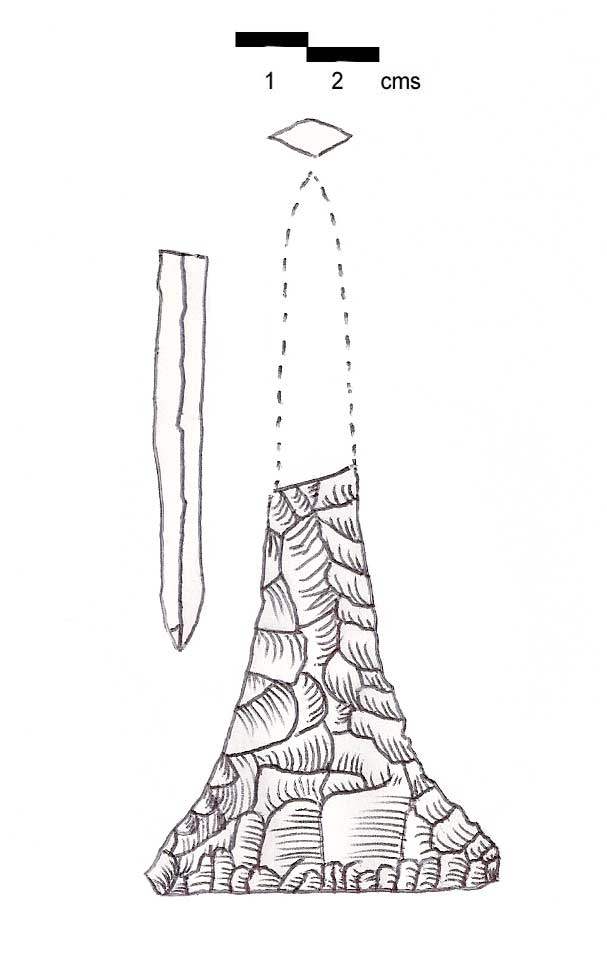
Minet ed Dhalia Point. Also called a "stylet". Discovered at Shemlan. White patinated flint.

Ras Beirut I or The Slope Breccia is on a steep limestone cliff, above Rue Zenzir, west of Rue Jinnah at around 52 metres (171 ft) above sea level. It was found by Henri Fleisch and published in 1946, 1956 and 1960 along with Howell in 1959 and Garrod in 1962 and 1965. An Early Acheulean or Abbevillian rolled biface was found by Fleisch in the breccia above Rue Jinnah that predates all of the other tools found at Ras Beirut. An abundant Middle Acheulean industry was also found.

Ras Beirut II or The Offshore Bar is a fossil bar of flint, gravel and marine organisms, 2.5 metres (8.2 ft) under the soil next to and under Rue Jinnah. It was studied by Henri Fleisch during the digging of a drainage trench who published results in 1951 and 1954. It is also mentioned by Howell in 1959 and Dorothy Garrod in 1960. Numerous pieces with no bifaces were found and considered to be Tayacian with some Levallois influence. The site possibly still exists under the road.

Ras Beirut III or Depots A. and B. is northeast of Rue Jinnah and was again found by Father Fleisch who published his studies in 1950 and 1956. Depot A contained an Early Levallois industry with bifaces and a type of pick resembling Bir Hassan picks.

Ras Beirut IV or Bergy's Trench is 100 metres (330 ft) east of Pigeon Rock, around 1.5 metres (4.9 ft) beneath the soil on the slope of the 45 metres (148 ft) terrace. The site was found by Auguste Bergy and published in 1932. Henri Fleisch also studied the area with and published some new discoveries in 1956. Early Levalloisian industries were found including bifacial Bir Hassan picks in the 20 centimetres (7.9 in) layer on the bedrock. Larger flint flakes were found in the 80 centimetres (31 in) layer above this. Fleisch recovered more of the earlier type of industry when the Corniche Road was widened and is suggested to still exist under a side road that leads to the Federal Hotel.

Ras Beirut V (a) or Bergy's "plus 8" Beach is 800 metres (2,600 ft) south of Pigeon Rock on the way to St. Elie beach at around 15 metres (49 ft) above sea level opposite the Continental Hotel. A layer of pebbles, marine shells and flints in the sandstone was found by Auguste Bergy and studied by Dubertret in 1937 and 1940, de Vaumas in 1947, Haller in 1945, Fleisch in 1956 and 1962, Howell in 1959 and Dorothy Garrod in 1960. Levalloisian materials are more evolved at this site and a Micro-Levalloisian series of tools were also found.

Ras Beirut V (b) or South Creek Trench is the same fossil beach in a section on the south bank of South Creek, 100 metres (330 ft) north of Ras Beirut V (a). It was discovered by Henri Fleisch and published in 1956. Two varieties of Levalloisian were found, one with finely produced thin flakes, the other with coarse thick ones. A Micro-Levalloisian industry accompanied it.

Ras Beirut VI is 200 metres (660 ft) north of Raoul Describes excavations at Minet ed Dhalia at the head of a small bay between two stream beds on a 15 metres (49 ft) terrace. A Micro-Levalloisian industry was found by Henri Fleisch and published in 1948 and 1956 dating to the time when the 15 metres (49 ft) sea level regressed.

Ras Beirut VII or South Creek is on the west side of the Corniche road, west of the Continental Hotel where the Wadi Abu Chahine drops to sea level. The site is on the north bank of the stream in a 5 metres (16 ft) long cavity in the cliff filled with soils. Fleisch found Levalloisian and Micro-Levalloisian industries in the upper layers. The site has now disappeared.

Ras Beirut VIII or Bay of Pigeon Rock is in a gully on the south cliff in the Bay of Pigeon Rock. Material was recovered in brecciated beach deposits representing a Levalloisian industry with traces of Micro-Levalloisian, this was studied by Fleisch and published in 1954 and 1956.

Ras Beirut IX or Depot facing cote 34 was discovered by Fleisch opposite the start of the Rue Jinnah (cote 34), 500 metres (1,600 ft) south of Pigeon Rock. The material is suggested to date to the time when the sea had retreated from the 15 metres (49 ft) level and consists of a Levalloisian industry with Mousterian influence with large, thin flakes. Some Micro-Levalloisian pieces were also found.

Ras Beirut X or Bain Militaire was originally called Sud Phare by its discoverer, Auguste Bergy. It was mentioned by Fleisch in 1956 as being in a rainwater gully, 200 metres (660 ft) south of Bain Militaire. Material was suggested to be of the Levallois form with some Bir Hassan picks similar to those at Ras Beirut III and IV but from a different level.

Ras Beirut XI or Minet ed Dhalia is on the second headland south of Pigeon Rock on the 15 metres (49 ft) terrace and was excavated by Raoul Describes in 1914, publishing his studies in 1921 and originally suggesting he had found a large number of tools and waste from a Solutrean industry in the black soil that covered the limestone headland at a depth of 1 metre (3.3 ft). Neuville and Haller studied the site and materials again in 1933, reclassifying it as Chalcolithic with a lower Middle Paleolithic level along with an intervening later that Describes had missed. Jacques Cauvin has compared it with the Énéolithique Ancien period at Byblos suggested to date between 3800 and 3650 BCE. The site is notable for a type tool called the Minet ed Dhalia point (pictured); a stylet ranging from 2 inches (5.1 cm) to 8 inches (20 cm) in length and may have been fleshing tools, but their exact use is uncertain. These were first observed by Dawson in 1884 and later by Godefroy Zumoffen in 1910, The industry includes javelins, borers, picks and assorted other tools. It has been described by Lorraine Copeland and Peter Wescombe as "probably the richest factory site in Lebanon" with hundreds of pieces recovered and held in the National Museum of Beirut.

Ras Beirut XII is thought to be in the area below the lighthouse and was found by Describes. It is recorded as a surface Acheulean site but appears to be a group of Neolithic pick along with factory waste. Construction of a playing field has covered the site with a false layer.

Ras Beirut XIII or Field south of Pigeon Rock is a cultivated field on the headland south of Pigeon rock where a surface site was found by Auguste Bergy and published in 1932. The Levallois industry is nicknamed Golden Mousterian due to it having a yellow or gold colour and sheen. Forms include large, broad flakes along with medium-sized points and blades with many pieces having traces of concretion.

Ras Beirut XIV or AUB Campus is part of the Ras Beirut station within the grounds of the American University of Beirut discussed by Zumoffen where thick, white Middle Paleolithic flakes were found on the slopes above the 15 metres (49 ft) terrace that have now been turned into a playing field next to International College Steps. Some Golden Mousterian pieces were found further down the slope.

== Demographics ==
Religion in Ras Beirut (2014)
Religion	Percent
Sunni Islam	63.69%
Shia Islam	4.09%
Christian	28.55%
Others	3.67%

In 2014, Muslims made up 67.83% and Christians made up 28.55% of registered voters in Ras Beirut. 63.69% of the voters were Sunni Muslims and 11.69% were Greek Orthodox.

== Notable families from Ras Beirut ==
- Daouk Family
- Sinno Family

== Ras Beirut Art Circle ==
The neighborhood is also home to many members of the artistic group the "Ras Beirut artists," a term coined by Palestinian historian Kamal Boullata. Notable artists in this circle include Jumana al-Husseini, Juliana Seraphim, and Paul Guiragossian. Most of the artists in this circle were Palestinians displaced from Palestine's urban centers by force. They tended to create work for an audience of wealth elites, including an international audience.

== Streets ==
- Bliss Street
- Rue Clémenceau
- Rue Madame Curie
- Avenue General de Gaulle
- Hamra Street
- Rue Jeanne d'Arc
- Rue John Kennedy
- Avenue de Paris
- Rue de Phénicie
- Rue George Post
- Rue Van Dyck
- Corniche Beirut
