= Children's Cancer Center of Lebanon =

Non-profit medical institution in Lebanon

Geography
- Location: Beirut, Lebanon
- Coordinates: 33.89762°N 35.48452°E

Organisation
- Care system: Private and charity
- Type: Specialized
- Religious affiliation: None

History
- Opened: 12 April 2002; 24 years ago

Links
- Website: cccl.org.lb
- Lists: Hospitals in Lebanon

The Children's Cancer Center of Lebanon (abbreviated CCCL; Arabic: مركز سرطان الأطفال في لبنان) is a nonprofit medical institution in Beirut dedicated to the treatment of and support for those with paediatric cancer.

The center is affiliated with St. Jude Children's Research Hospital, headquartered in Memphis, Tennessee, United States. On 12 April 2002, the Prime Minister of Lebanon, Rafic Hariri, attended the inauguration ceremony of the center. The center is located in Building 56 at Rue Clémenceau and operates in association with the nearby American University of Beirut Medical Center.

The center does not receive government funding, and is instead completely supported by private donations. During the Lebanese liquidity crisis, the center has seen a decrease in donations, and donations in Lebanese pounds have significantly decreased in value due to the crisis, which has put the center's operations at risk.

Further, during the Hezbollah–Israel conflict, the center identified the home location of patients, directing them to alternative centers if travel proved to be difficult due to violence. In 2024, the center had more than 400 patients, representing about 60% of all paediatric cancer patients in Lebanon.
