= Rue Madame Curie =

Street in Beirut, Lebanon

Rue Madame Curie is a street in Beirut, Lebanon. The street, which is named in honor of Marie Curie, the Polish–French physicist–chemist, begins at Rue Badr Demachkieh in the Raouché neighborhood of the Ras Beirut district, running west–east through the Qoreitem-Snoubra neighborhood then, intersecting Rue Alfred Nobel and Rue Dunant before turning into Rue Marie Edde. The street runs south of the Lebanese American University campus. Le Bristol hotel is located on the street. In 2008, the average residential apartment price on Rue Madame Curie was US$2,500/m^{2}.

== See also ==
- Ras Beirut
- Beirut
