= Rue Van Dyck =

Street in Beirut

Rue Van Dyck is a street in Beirut, Lebanon. The street, which is located in the Ras Beirut district, was named after Cornelius Van Allen Van Dyck, who was professor of pathology and internal medicine in the medical school at the American University of Beirut from 1857 until 1882. The street runs east–west from Rue John Kennedy to Rue George Post.

== See also ==
- Ras Beirut
- Beirut
