= Rue de Phénicie =

Street in Beirut, Lebanon

Rue de Phénicie or Phoenicia Street is a street in Beirut, Lebanon. The street runs north–south from the Mediterranean uphill to where Rue John Kennedy meets Rue Omar Daouk, intersecting Rue Ibn Sina, Rue London, and Rue Rustom Pacha.

The street is located in the Zaytuneh neighborhood of Ras Beirut, where the city had expanded westerly outside the city walls in the mid -800s.. It was formally recognized during the period of the French Mandate with the construction of Avenue des Français that ran along its seaboard.

After independence, the neighborhood hosted numerous cafes, bars, cabarets and brothels, such as the Black Elephant, the Lido, and Eve. The night scene expanded to include Rue de Phénicie, which quickly surpassed all other streets in the neighborhood, becoming "the night's center of gravity". The upsurge of Rue de Phénicie was due to the opening of the nightclub, Les Caves du Roy, that quickly became the hangout of the rich and famous, including Marlon Brando and Brigitte Bardo. The infamous cabaret, The Crazy Horse, a favorite hangout of pre-terrorism Osama Bin Laden, was also located on the street. Other establishments on the street in the 1960s and 1970s was Lucky Luke as well as Stéréo-Club and Epi-Club that catered to a younger clientele. Restaurants were also plentiful, including the fashionable Grenier des Artistes.

== See also ==
- The Crazy Horse
- Ras Beirut
- Beirut
