= Daouk family =

Daouk (آل داعوق)
- Current region: Ras Beirut, Lebanon
- Origin: al-Andalus or Andalusia
- Members: 2000 members
- Connected families: Mneimne Family, Kadi Family, Itani Family, Sinno Family

The Al Daouk family (Arabic: آل داعوق, originally the family can trace its roots back to al-Andalus or Andalusia, before the Reconquista took place. (دعق Daaqa, meaning "to induce"),^{[1]} also transliterated as (Daouk, Al Daouk and Daooq) is a prominent Beiruti family that stemmed in Ras Beirut, Lebanon during the 15th century; after fleeing Marrakesh, Morocco, the family escaped Morocco in the late 12th century from Marrakesh to the Levant during the Reconquista inquisition. The immigration came as a consequence of the heavy influx of refugees from the Iberian Peninsula. This was due to the heavy influx of Arab refugees coming from the Iberian Peninsula to the Maghreb and the Levant following the fall of Al-Andalus to the Catholic Monarchs.

The family became one of Beirut's most prominent families after a truce that bound them to the "Seven Families of Beirut" agreement of 1350 (disputed with 1351). The written agreement also included the Sinno, Kreidiyyeh, Itani, Doughan, Mneimneh and Houry families but has since been lost. Most of Beirut's original families descend from or are related to one of the Seven Families. The families’ names were not necessarily written and spelled the same as they are today. The Daouks initially arrived in Beirut as the "Dawakites" or الدواكة and eventually became the house of Daouk or آل الداعوق.

The agreement of 1350 allowed the Seven Families to act as a single body to govern and protect Beirut. The Seven Families subsequently signed an agreement with the ruling Mamluk Sultanate of Egypt. The agreement conferred that they would administer Beirut's internal affairs and protect its people, while the Mamluks, under Prince Soudoon I, would handle military action within and outside Beirut. The agreement was a means of protecting Beirut from foreign powers.

It also ensured that all Beirutis would be entrusted with the protection of Beirut and therefore would be able to become one of the seven families that may caretake a gate. However, the Seven Families retained this entitlement mostly if not every time for unknown reasons. It is mostly agreed on the grounds that these families were known as the ‘Omana’, the trustworthy ones. The agreement would stay enacted throughout the era of the Mamluk Sultanate of Egypt, which spanned between 1250 and 1517, until its downfall at the hands of the Ottoman Empire.

== Introduction ==
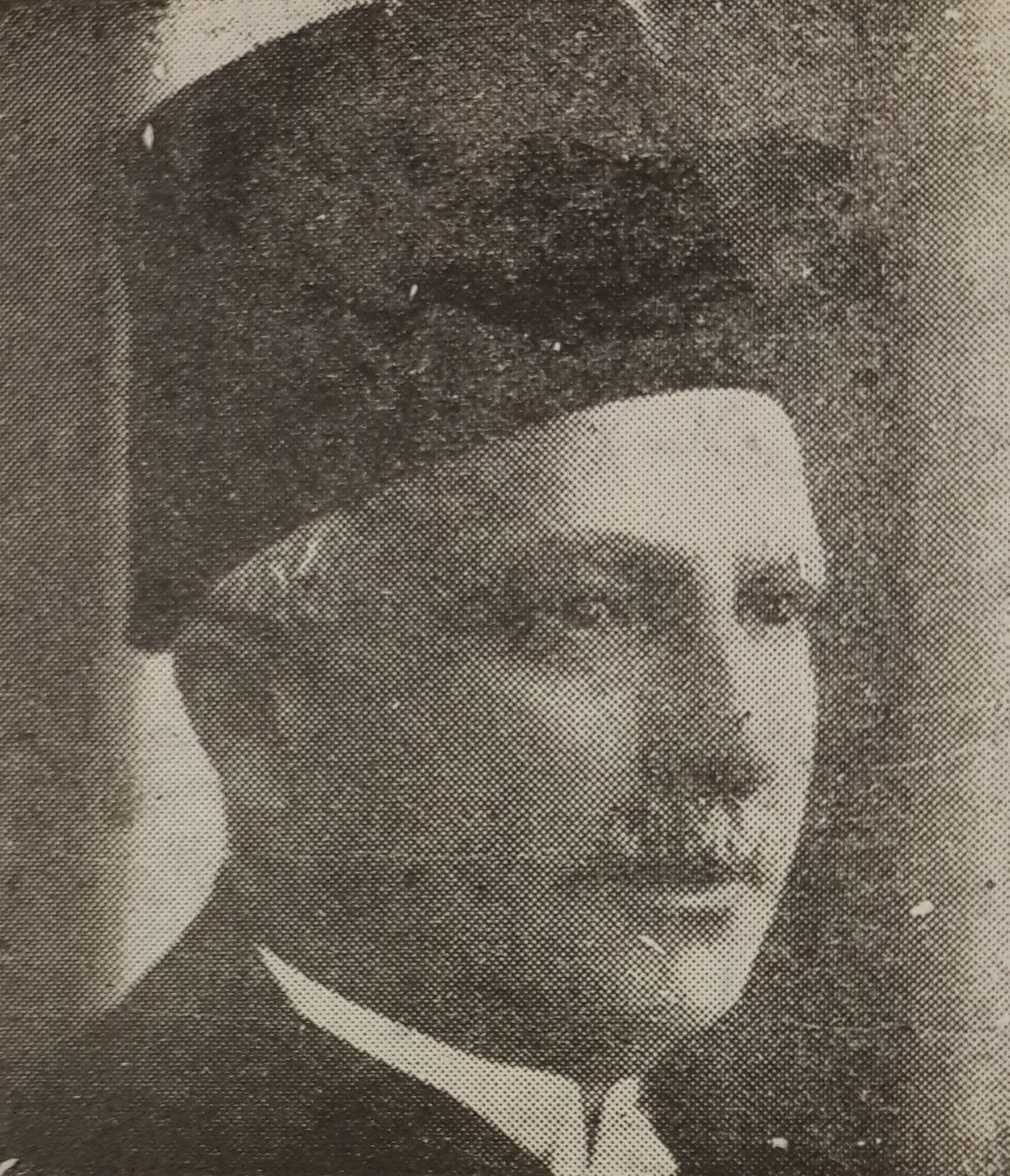
Omar Beik Daouk during his leadership throughout the Ottoman Era.

The Daouk Family is known as one of the 'Seven Families of Beirut' along the other six families; the Mneimneh Family, the Sinno Family, the Kreidiyyeh Family, the Itani Family, the Doughan Family and the Houry Family. The Daouk Family members mostly reside in Ras Beirut and other districts within the Lebanese Capital. Other smaller communities of the family may also reside in California, Ontario, Quebec, Marrakesh and Syrian cities such as Damascus and Hama. The majority of the family adhere to the Sunni faith of Islam.

== Current ==
As of today, the family is mostly known for the Izzat Daouk franchise and Mohammad Amin Daouk who is the President of Nejmeh SC, one of the oldest and most successful Lebanese football clubs. Other influential members include Walid Daouk who was the Information Minister of Lebanon in 2011 and Amine Mohammad Daouk, the president of the Makassed Organization.

The social status of the family has been prominent throughout the past two centuries especially in Lebanese governance and politics. The most two notable members are Omar Beik Daouk and Ahmad Daouk. Omar served as the first Head of State of Beirut throughout the Ottoman Era. Ahmad Daouk was the Prime Minister of Lebanon in 1941 and 1960; he was also Minister of National Defense in his own cabinet. During his period as Prime Minister, Lebanon enjoyed very close relationships and alliances with the United States and France.

Omar Daouk had 2 sons, Mohamed and Hasan. Hasan Omar Daouk's wife, Hassana Fathallah-Daouk, was a prominent philanthropist member of several cultural organizations, such as the Lebanese Red Cross. She was also president of the Child and Mother Welfare Society, which runs a hospital, senior housing, and a development and career training center promoting the health and social success of modest income families in Beirut. She has a street named after her near the headquarters of that organization. Hassana was awarded the Lebanese Golden Medal of Achievement, the highest civilian honor awarded by the Republic of Lebanon.

The family's members currently run an annual event by where all members of the extensive family meet each and get to know each other. Such events are regularly hosted in Beirut's Movenpick Hotel. The Lebanese sweet daoukieh was named after the family due to its creator, who was Daouk.

May Daouk currently owns a villa in Beirut, featured on many websites and social media networks such as Pinterest and Architectural Digest.. The villa is a blend of traditional Beiruti-Lebanese architecture with modern elements.

== Legacy ==
The legacy of the Daouk Family is one that is noteworthy, to the extent that two streets in the Beirut Central District are named after them. Omar Daouk Street is situated at the heart of the Lebanese Capital minutes away from Downtown Beirut (Coordinates: 33°53'55"N 35°29'53"E.) The street consists of two parallel roads, with residential and commercial buildings in between the roads that merge at the Omar Daouk Square. "The Omar Daouk Square was designed by Mohammad Halawi around a bust by Maguerditch Mazmanian of Omar Daouk himself. With the aim of upgrading the square from a green island into a space connected to the surroundings, the new design of the Omar Daouk Square enlarges its size, introduces three terraces to soften the site incline, and creates an attractive open area where one can sit and rest." Ahmad Daouk Street (Coordinates: 33°54'3.61"N35°30'0.00" E) is perpendicular to Bab Idriss, which is connected to Omar Daouk Street. The street is two blocks from the Lebanese parliament and consists of a double-way two lane road connecting Beirut's Corniche Road to the Beirut Central District.

The Daouk Family historically resided in The Rose House in Ras Beirut. Alongside the Adrati Family, the Daouk Family preserved the Beirut landmark that was built in 1882 having settled in the villa for nearly three decades. Today it is currently owned outside the family by Hisham Jaroudi.

== Notable members of the Daouk Family ==
Ahmad Daouk: Prime Minister of Lebanon in 1941 and 1960; he was also Minister of National Defense in his own cabinet.

Walid Daouk: Former Information Minister of Lebanon in 2011 and a businessman.

Tarik El-Daouk: Lebanese Business Entrapeneur and Engineer.

Feras El-Daouk: Lebanese Business Entrapeneur and Consultant.

Hasan El-Daouk: Lebanese Business Entrapeneur notably his printing factory, and a prominent Muezzin in the Shatila Mosque and Imam Ali Mosque in Beirut.

== Photo gallery ==
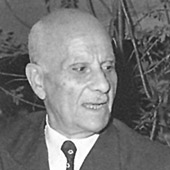
Prime Minister Ahmad Daouk

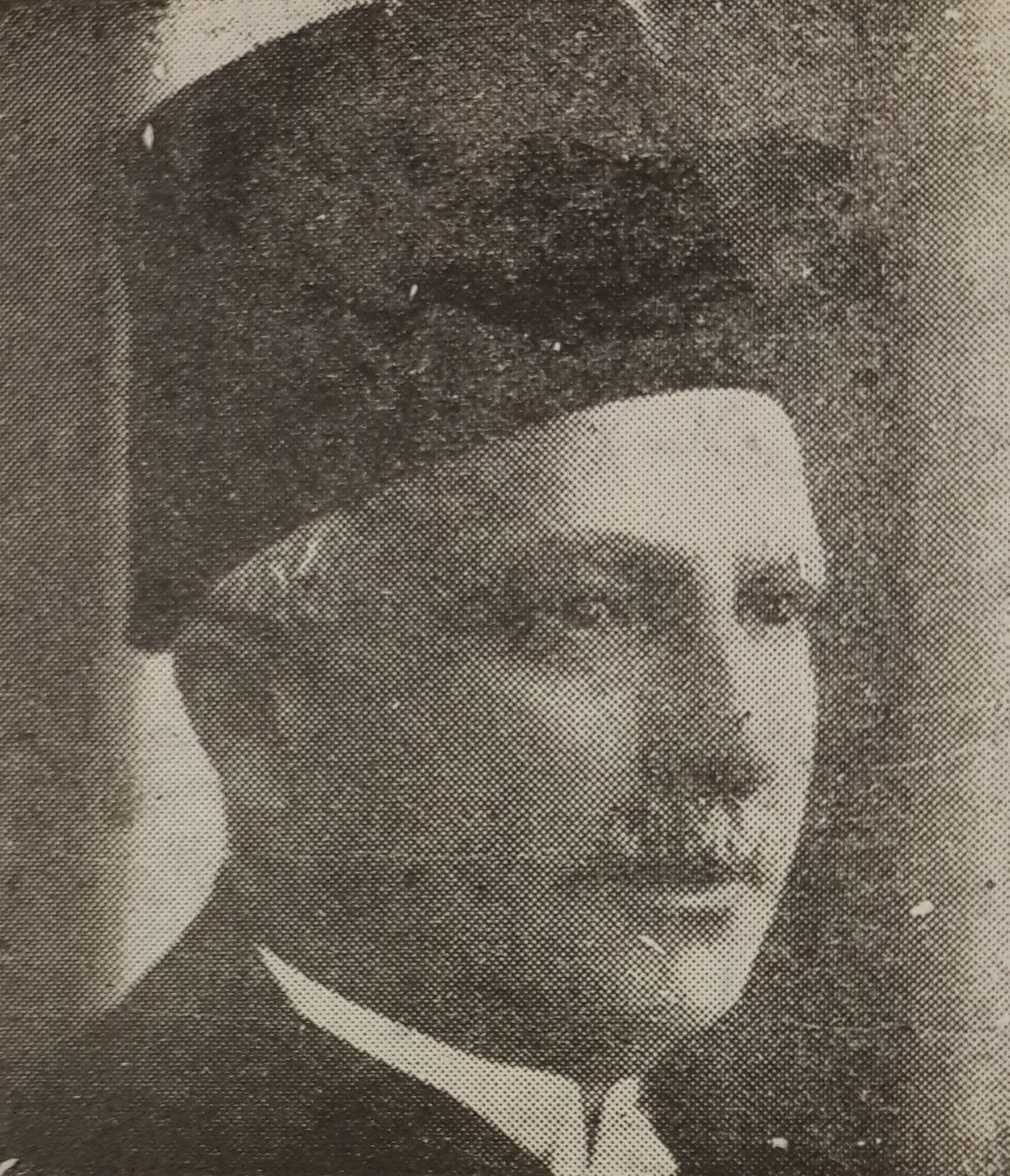
Omar Bey Daouk

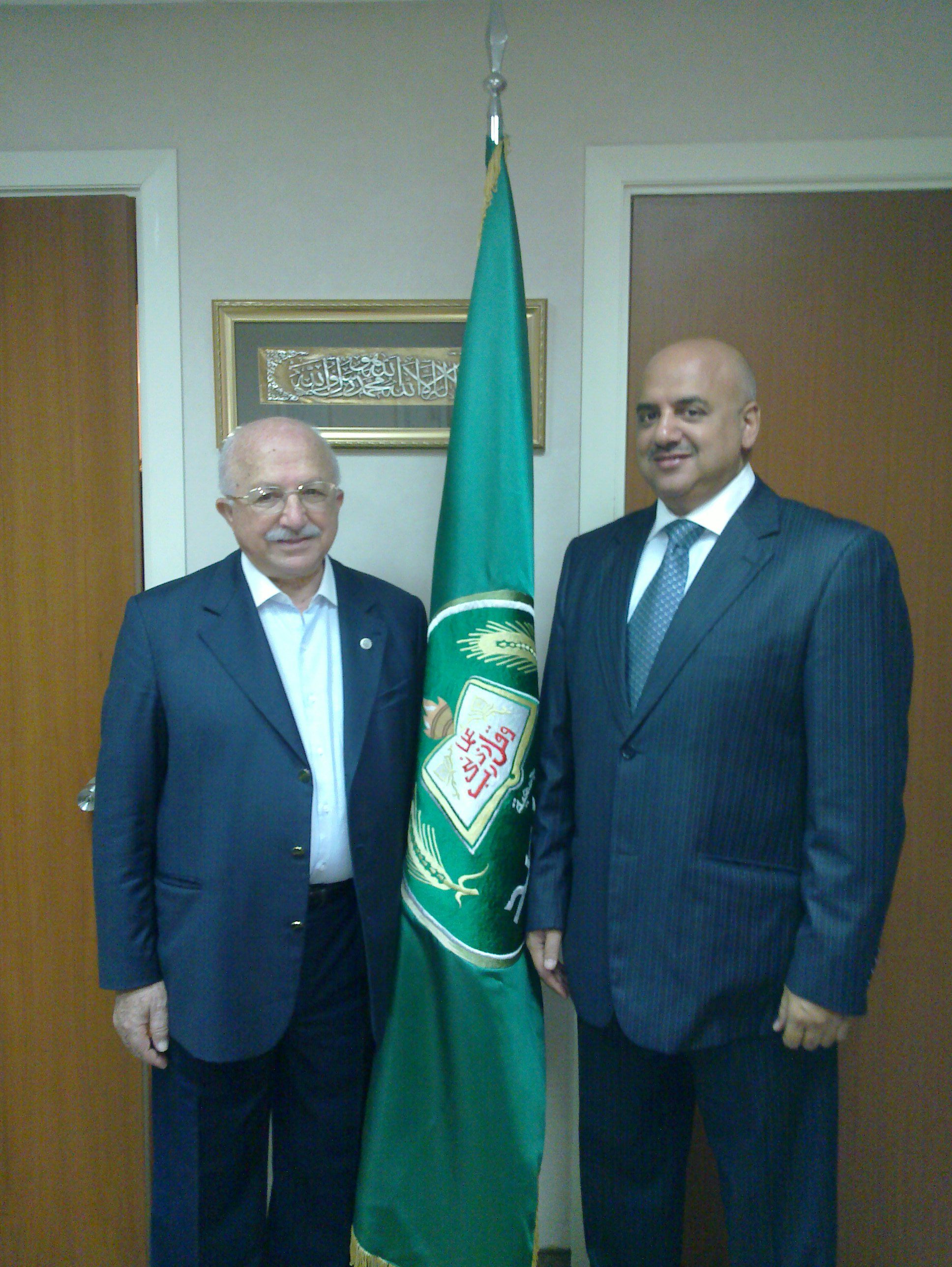
Amine Mohamad Daouk

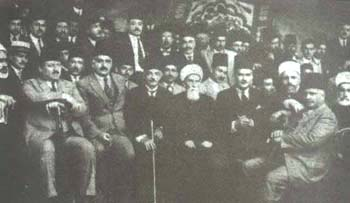
Omar Bey Daouk and other Ottoman governors in Beirut sometime around 1915.
