= Rue Clemenceau =

Street in Beirut, Lebanon

Rue Clemenceau is a commercial and residential street in Beirut, Lebanon. The street was named in honor of Georges Clemenceau who accepted the post of premier of France in 1917 during World War I. The neighborhood straddling Clemenceau Street was prior to the war one of the most cosmopolitan areas of the city and home to Christians, Muslims, Druze and Jews.

The street runs east-west from Avenue Fakhreddine, intersecting several streets, including Emir Omar, George Cyr, May Ziadeh, Mexique, Justinien, Nicolas Rebeiz, and Rue John Kennedy where it turns into Bliss Street. Rue Clemenceau is within walking distance to Rue Hamra, Haigazian University, and the American University of Beirut, which is located on Bliss Street.

Rue Clemenceau is known for its numerous medical institutes, such as the American University of Beirut Medical Center (AUBMC), the Children's Cancer Center of Lebanon, and the Clemenceau Medical Center, which is an affiliate of Johns Hopkins Medicine International. The Ecole Supérieure des Affaires is also located on Clemenceau and the Collège de la Sagesse section Saint-Élie which is one of the best catholic schools in the country. Also located on Rue Clemenceau is the 55,000 square-meter, business complex, Centre Gefinor, which was designed in the late 1960s by Dr. ETH Ing. Walid Jabri, the architect and structural engineer. Victor Gruen, an Austrian architect, designed the complete commercial area on the ground floor and the mezzanine, after completion of the skeleton.

== See also ==
- Ras Beirut
- Beirut
