= Ras Beirut artists =

20th-century school of Palestinian artists

According to Palestinian artist and art historian Kamal Boullata (1942–2019), Ras Beirut refers to a group of Palestinian artists who practiced in Lebanon's cultural capital of Beirut in the twentieth century following their displacement during the Nakba. Despite the trauma of displacement, these artists enjoyed a level of wealth and comfort due to their families’ socio-economic statuses and prominence first in Palestine's major cities and later in cosmopolitan Beirut society. The Ras Beirut artists had access to formal education and artistic training, and many studied abroad in Europe or the United States. Many Ras Beirut artists drew inspiration from Palestinian artistic traditions combined with newer and more contemporary artistic styles and techniques learned in Beirut.

Boullata's model for understanding Palestinian art production in Beirut splits Palestinian artists into two groups, differentiating between the Ras Beirut artists and their counterparts in the refugee camps. Some art historians, such as Alessandra Amin, take issue with this distinction as reductive in its refusal to engage with the complexities of Lebanese sectarian politics and their impact on Palestinians in exile. "Ras Beirut" is not a universally agreed-upon school of artists, and the term should not be used without reference to Boullata's work.

== Ras Beirut neighborhood ==
Artists who were considered to be a part of the Ras Beirut scene found themselves in Lebanon because they were displaced from their homes in Palestine. Juliana Seraphim, Jumana el-Husseini, Paul Guiragossian, and all other Ras Beirut Artists were either displaced during the events of 1948 or fled soon after, in the following years, in search of refuge from the dire living conditions that the Palestinians have and continue to be subjected to. Because of this commonality, we see themes of displacement and the longing to return home to Palestine throughout the works of many Ras Beirut artists.

Ras Beirut is a coastal neighborhood located in eastern Beirut, Lebanon. It is home to the American University of Beirut, and thus a center for the city's educated and wealthy populations. Ras Beirut was not only known for its education and wealth, but also its emphasis on culture and art. The neighborhood was home to plenty of theaters, bookstores, and art galleries to satiate its residents’ appetites for artistic expression.

The neighborhood is home to many members of the group termed by Palestinian historian Kamal Boullata the “Ras Beirut artists.” Most were bourgeois artists who hailed from Palestine's urban centers and, once in Beirut, created works for an audience of wealthy elites. These artists were Palestinians living in Lebanon, not by choice but as a result of forced displacement from their neighborhoods and cities. While Ras Beirut artists were also Palestinian refugees, they did not face the same challenges as those living in the refugee camps. From their positions in high society, their works were quickly able to reach and benefit from an international audience.

The artists’ works were very in touch with the international art scene, as many had spent a considerable time in Western countries. Some even moved out of Beirut and spent very little time there, but their ties to the art scene there earned them the title of Ras Beirut artist. Many of these artists, though, did remain in Ras Beirut. Their public, well-known careers as a result of their wealth allowed them an ease in exhibiting and selling their works which their refugee camp counterparts were not afforded.

== Key artists ==
=== Jumana al-Husseini ===
Jumana al-Husseini (b. 1932) moved to Beirut with her family after their home in the outskirts of Jerusalem was hit by an Israeli bomb in 1948. The Husseinis had previously fled to Beirut when Jumana's grandfather, Jamal al-Husseini, the Palestinian nationalist and founder of the Palestine Arab Party was exiled by the British following the Arab revolt of 1936–39 in Palestine. The Husseinis were already familiar with Beirut and its more affluent social circles. When the American University of Beirut opened up a Fine Arts department in 1954, al-Husseini enrolled in some painting courses and within a few years her work had become popular amongst Beirut's wealthy cosmopolitan circles and was showcased at Lebanon's prestigious Salon d’Automne at the Sursock Museum.

Al-Husseini painted the city of Jerusalem utilizing “unsaturated colors” highlighted by gold leaf and “ornamental elements” to depict the city as an “impregnable fortress”. Additionally, al-Husseini utilized patterns traditionally stitched by Palestinian Tatreez embroiderers, as demonstrated by the fringe bordering the map of Palestine and the embroidery on the horse's saddle resulting in a dreamlike quality to all of paintings, which have been described to resemble “fairy tales.”

=== Juliana Seraphim ===
Juliana Seraphim was born in Yaffa in 1934, but soon fled the city on a fishing boat to the Lebanese city of Saida in 1948. Four years later she and her family ended up moving to Beirut, where Seraphim began to take painting lessons in 1952. This quickly led to her becoming a prominent member of the Ras Beirut circle, as Seraphim's work was put on display, alongside Al-Hussseini's at the Sursock Museums Salon d’Automne.

Seraphim portrayed iconic Palestinian landscapes, like the city of Jerusalem or orange orchards in a dreamlike fashion, often adding underwater mythological creatures that “challenged all sense of gravity” to cityscapes of Jerusalem, or including geometric patterns borrowed from Islamic frescos as sources of decorative imagery. When asked about the sources behind her imagery Seraphim said she was inspired by supernatural imagery and geometric imagery found in the Islamic frescos in her grandfather's house when she went to visit him in Jerusalem.

=== Paul Guiragossian ===
Paul Guiragossian (1926–93) was born in Jerusalem to a poor Armenian family and was taken in by Catholic monks at the age of three. His innate artistic talent was discovered at a young age and he was sent to take part in an apprenticeship in religious icon painting in Italy. After completing his apprenticeship, Guiragossian moved to Beirut due to escalating violence in his home city of Jerusalem. He quickly became one of the most prominent and recognizable members of the Ras Beirut circle. Despite achieving incredibly high status within the Ras Beirut community, Guiragossian lived and worked in Beirut's humble neighborhood of Bourj Hammoud.

Guiragossian chose to portray common people from his neighborhood in the same fashion a traditional Christian iconographic painter would portray a biblical figure, using oil paint as his preferred medium and utilizing still lives to decorate the scene. Guiragossian even had his own modern-day version of the Madonna and Child invoking the tradition of Palestinian iconographic painting, even in exile. Many of Guiragossian's paintings are faceless, speaking to his displaced refugee identity, both as a Palestinian and an Armenian.

== List of artists ==
- Maliha Afnan
- Rita Daoud
- Laila al-Shawwa
- Vladimir Tamari
- Kamal Boullata
- Juliana Seraphim
- Jumana al-Husseini
- Paul Guiragossian
