= Ahmad Daouk =

Lebanese politician

- أحمد الداعوق
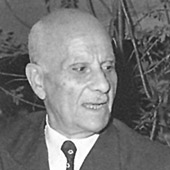
- Daouk in 1970

12th Prime Minister of Lebanon
- In office May 15, 1960 – July 3, 1960
- Nominated by: Fuad Chehab
- Appointed by: President of Lebanon
- President: Fuad Chehab
- Preceded by: Rashid Karami
- Succeeded by: Saeb Salam
- In office December 1, 1941 – July 26, 1942
- Nominated by: Alfred Georges Naccache
- Appointed by: President of the French Mandate of Lebanon
- President: Alfred Georges Naccache
- Preceded by: Alfred Georges Naccache
- Succeeded by: Sami Solh

Personal details
- Born: 1892 Ras Beirut, Beirut, Beirut Vilayet, Ottoman Empire
- Died: 24 August 1979 (87 years old) Beirut, Lebanon
- Party: Independent
- Education: l'Ecole Nationale d'Aix-en-Provence

Ahmad Bey Daouk (Arabic: أحمد بيك الداعوق; 1892–1979) was a Lebanese politician who on two occasions became Prime Minister of Lebanon. He was born in 1892 to the Daouk Family. He was the younger brother of Omar Bey Daouk, the Head of Beirut Vilayet that time (pre-Greater Lebanon) before the French Mandate of Lebanon. Daouk was known for being one of few men to ever serve as prime minister of Lebanon in the French Mandate of Lebanon and the First Republic of Lebanon (1943–1991). Sami Solh also served within these two periods.

== Early life and education ==
Daouk was born in Ras Beirut in 1892. After completing his secondary studies in a French school in Beirut in 1910, Daouk went to France to continue his studies where he obtained a diploma in engineering from the National School of Arts and Crafts of Aix-en-Provence in 1914.

== Early career ==
Daouk's notable career began in 1915 where he worked as an engineer at the Société Générale des Sucreries within the refinery industry of Egypt. In 1919 he was assigned personally by King Hussein I of Hejaz, as his technical adviser and he was put in charge of the mining industry in Hejaz. Upon returning from Hejaz to Lebanon, Daouk was appointed by Charles Debbas as both the Mayor of Beirut and Aley.

This was of course just 8 years after Omar Bey Daouk was the Mayor of Beirut and the head of Beirut Vilayet in 1918 before the collapse of the Ottoman Empire. Daouk was Mayor until 1941 until he was appointed as Prime Minister of Lebanon. In 1927 Daouk became an influential philanthropist in Beirut. Throughout this period Daouk was influential along other political figures in visioning Lebanon's independence carving the path towards it.

== First Mandate ==
Daouk's first mandate was during the French Mandate when, after having served as Secretary of State for Public Works and Post Telephone and Telegraph earlier in 1941, he was appointed Prime Minister 1941 to 1942 during the rule of President Alfred Naqqache by the President of Lebanon. His first mandate was renowned for helping pave the way for Lebanon's independence, after he had stepped down from his role in 1942 increasing the pressure asserted on France's actions by the United Kingdom and the western powers.

Although he had very close ties with France on the political sphere, Daouk was known for fully supporting the idea of a free and independent Lebanese republic. Upon resignation, as Sunni Muslim judge from Sidon known as Sami Solh was appointed as Daouk's successor

== Diplomatic career ==
In 1943, Daouk became the President of the National Congress of Lebanon right after he completed his term as prime minister, or what was called the President of Councils before 1943. In 1944 Daouk was chosen as the consul of Lebanon to France he would become an ambassador in 1953 and remain at that position within his diplomatic mission for another five years until his return in 1958. His diplomatic mission was widely supported by the Lebanese as he severely re-strengthened Lebanon's ties with France, while Camile Chamoun was shifting Lebanon's ties towards the United States. In 1958 Daouk was appointed ambassador to Spain where he strengthened the ties between Lebanon and Spain and promoted economic and political cooperation in various projects within Lebanon. A program was also launched to attract and re-invite the Lebanese diaspora that had left Lebanon earlier to Latin America. Daouk has also been a delegate of Lebanon in many conferences within the United Nations, Arab League and UNESCO. After his second mandate, Daouk became a director of the OGERO group, Lebanon's telecommunications company, he also had an intuitive role in real estate.

== Second Mandate ==
Upon the election of Fuad Chehab as President of Lebanon, he dissolved the Lebanese parliament on 5 May 1960. This forced Prime Minister Karami to resign later on 14 May 1960. On 15 May 1960, Daouk took initiative and formed an interim government while heading it as prime minister to hold back the increasing tensions in Lebanon during the political vacuum of the early 1960s. The Lebanese Parliamentary elections were held and finalized by 3 July 1960. Daouk's interim government granted 11 seats to Karami's party in the Chamber of Deputies whereas the independent politicians (of whom Daouk was one) were granted 41 out of 99 seats in the Chamber of Deputies. This paved the way for Saeb Salam's election later that year. In addition, Daouk was also Minister of National Defense during his prime ministership. His policies were credible as they contributed to Lebanon's booming economy in the 1960s where the Lebanese were among the wealthiest 30 nations in the world.

== Personal life ==
Outside Parliament, Daouk was noted by others to be very similar to his iconic brother Omar. Omar Bey Daouk was quoted by Michel Chiha's personal observations:

“…My recently departed friend had all the characteristics of a sage. Both in private and in public, he was an upstanding citizen. We were both members of the first committee that saw to the birth of our nation’s Constitution. He was known for his quiet discernment, his respect for the rights of others, for his perfect understanding of the country’s multiplicity, his sense of harmony and his recognition of the political and social benefits that Greater Lebanon offered all its citizens. He saw in it the possibilities of a multi-communal society. More at home behind the scenes, his advice was often called upon in matters of state or business. The nation will always remember what he stood for and will always be grateful for the public contributions of this exemplary man…”

‘Omar Bey Daouk’, M.C., Le Jour, November 1949.

== Honors ==
- Honorary Colonel of the Army of (Hejaz)

- Grand Cross of the Legion of Honor (France)

- Medal of Vermeil of the City of Paris (France)

- Grand Cross of the Order of Christ (Portugal)

- Grand Cross of the Order of Merit (Spain)

- Grand Officer of the Order of St. Charles (Monaco)

- Grand Officer of the Order of Nahda (Hejaz)

- Grand Officer of the Umayyad Order (Syria)

- Grand Officer of the Order of the Cedar (Lebanon)

- Medal of Queen Elizabeth (England)

== Gallery ==
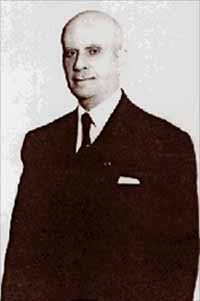

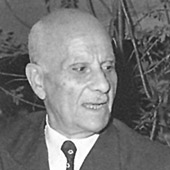

Political offices
Preceded by Alfred Georges Naccache	Prime Minister of Lebanon; 1941–1942	Succeeded by Sami Solh
Preceded by Rachid Karami	Prime Minister of Lebanon; 1960	Succeeded by Saeb Salam
