= Rue John Kennedy =

Street in Beirut, Lebanon

Rue John Kennedy is a street in Beirut, Lebanon. The street, originally called Rue Perthuis, was renamed in honor of President John F. Kennedy on November 30, 1963. The street, which is located in the Ras Beirut district of the Lebanese capital, is a one-way street that runs east–west from Rue de Phénicie, past Rue Nicolas Rebeiz and Rue Van Dyck, and then curving to the south along the campus walls of the American University of Beirut until it reaches Rue Clémenceau where it ends. It is primarily a residential street with some small hotels.

== In literature ==
- Soujourns by Christina Pantoja-Hidalgo

"It is a flight of 77 stone steps, connecting our street to Rue John Kennedy, where Tony's office is."

- The Man in the Middle by Hugh Atkinson

"He pushed his bag before him into the cab and instructed the driver to take him to Rue John Kennedy."

== See also ==
- Ras Beirut
- Beirut
- List of memorials to John F. Kennedy
