= Hazem Daouk =

Hazem Daouk is a financial economist, known for his empirical work on financial markets, especially stocks, futures and options. He is a professor at Cornell University where he holds the Peter J. & Stephanie J. Nolan chair. His articles have been cited over 7,000 times (Google Scholar). Daouk is the general manager of United Insurance Company.

In 1998, his research uncovered the rampant insider trading on the Mexican Stock Exchange. (Note: “When an event is not an event: The curious case of an emerging market” (with U. Bhattacharya, B. Jorgenson, and C. Kehr), Journal of Financial Economics, 2000, 55, 69-101.) This led to many questions about the value and the enforceability of insider trading laws. The study won the Best Academic Paper Award offered by the International Investment Forum at the University of Chicago.

In later research, Daouk conducted a comprehensive survey of insider trading laws and prosecution in about a hundred countries that have a stock market. He then showed that countries that enforce insider trading laws reduce the cost of financing of companies by many percentage points. This is because outside investors no longer require to be compensated for the money they lose from trading with better-informed insiders. On the other hand, having the law without enforcing it, does not do anything. (Note: “The world price of insider trading” (with U. Bhattacharya), Journal of Finance, 2002, 57, 75-108. Reprinted in Claessens S. and L. Laeven (ed), 2006, “A reader in international corporate finance”, World Bank, Herndon, VA, USA.) This research was nominated for the Smith Breeden Prize for Best Paper in the Journal of Finance for the year 2002.

A little before the Enron scandal, Daouk was investigating whether informational risk associated with accounting earnings quality impacts stock markets around the world (he analyzed financial statements from 34 countries for the period 1985–1998). He found that accounting manipulation in a country, increases significantly the cost of financing of companies and reduces liquidity. (Note: “The world price of earnings opacity” (with U. Bhattacharya and M. Welker), Accounting Review, 2003, 78, 641-678.) He also found that the country with the most accounting manipulation was Greece. A year later, the European Commission issued a formal warning after Greece was found to have falsified budget deficit data in run-up to joining the eurozone. A few years later, the Greek debt crisis started.

Daouk is also known for his research that documents short selling laws and practice in about a hundred stock markets in the world. The magazine The Banker has written that "Most Western regulatory bodies tend to subscribe broadly to the findings" of Daouk, which concluded that when short selling is possible, stock prices are less volatile and there is greater liquidity. However, in an interview with the same magazine, he stated that he did not oppose the temporary restrictions on short selling that were enacted in different countries in reaction to the financial crisis. (Note: “Market-wide short-selling restrictions” (with A. Charoenrook), Cornell University working paper, 2005.)

In 2025, Daouk warned that the private nature of SpaceX stocks has lead scammers to target would-be investors.
