= Walid Daouk =

Lebanese businessman and politician (born 1958)

Minister of Information
- In office June 2011 – 15 February 2014
- Prime Minister: Najib Mikati
- Succeeded by: Ramzi Joreig

Personal details
- Born: 1958 (age 67–68)
- Party: Independent
- Education: Saint Joseph University
- Occupation: Lawyer

Walid Daouk (Arabic: وليد الداعوق; born 1958) is a Lebanese lawyer, businessman and politician. He served as information minister between June 2011 and February 2014.

== Early life and education ==
Daouk was born into a Sunni family, the Daouk Family, in 1958. He received a bachelor's degree in Lebanese law from Saint Joseph University. He also obtained a master's degree in French law from the same university.

== Career ==
Daouk is a board member of various companies. He was appointed information minister to the cabinet led by Prime Minister Najib Mikati in July 2011. Daouk was an independent member of the cabinet and was appointed to the post by Mikati. In March 2013, Daouk drafted the Lebanese internet regulation act, which was regarded by the world association of newspapers and news publishers as a threat for online freedoms. He was also the government commissioner at the Beirut stock exchange.

Daouk's term as information minister ended on 15 February 2014, and Ramzi Joreig succeeded him in the post.
