= Rue George Post =

Street in Beirut, Lebanon

- Rue George Post street name sign
- Interactive map of Rue George Post
- Location: Beirut District, Lebanon
- Coordinates: 33.9006219°N 35.4861670°E

Rue George Post is a street in Beirut, Lebanon. The street, which is located in the Ras Beirut district, was named after Dr. George Edward Post, one of the founders of the American University of Beirut. Dr. Post was a professor of surgery (1869 until his death in 1909), who also contributed to the study of ecology and vegetation of the Middle East. The residential street is located north of the American University of Beirut campus between Rue Van Dyck and Dar El Mreissé, one block south of the seaside Corniche Beirut.

== In Literature ==
- Soujourns by Christina Pantoja-Hidalgo

"'And are there ladder-streets, too?' I asked. He grinned broadly. 'Come to think of it, there's one right behind our flat.' As we swung into the Avenue de Paris, I decided that this time, I would keep a journal. . . Tony has found us a furnished flat in a little street called Rue George Post— a charming place. . . ."

== See also ==
- Ras Beirut
- Beirut
