= Bliss Street =

One of the principal streets of the Hamra area in Beirut

Coordinates: 33.898623°N 35.477525°E

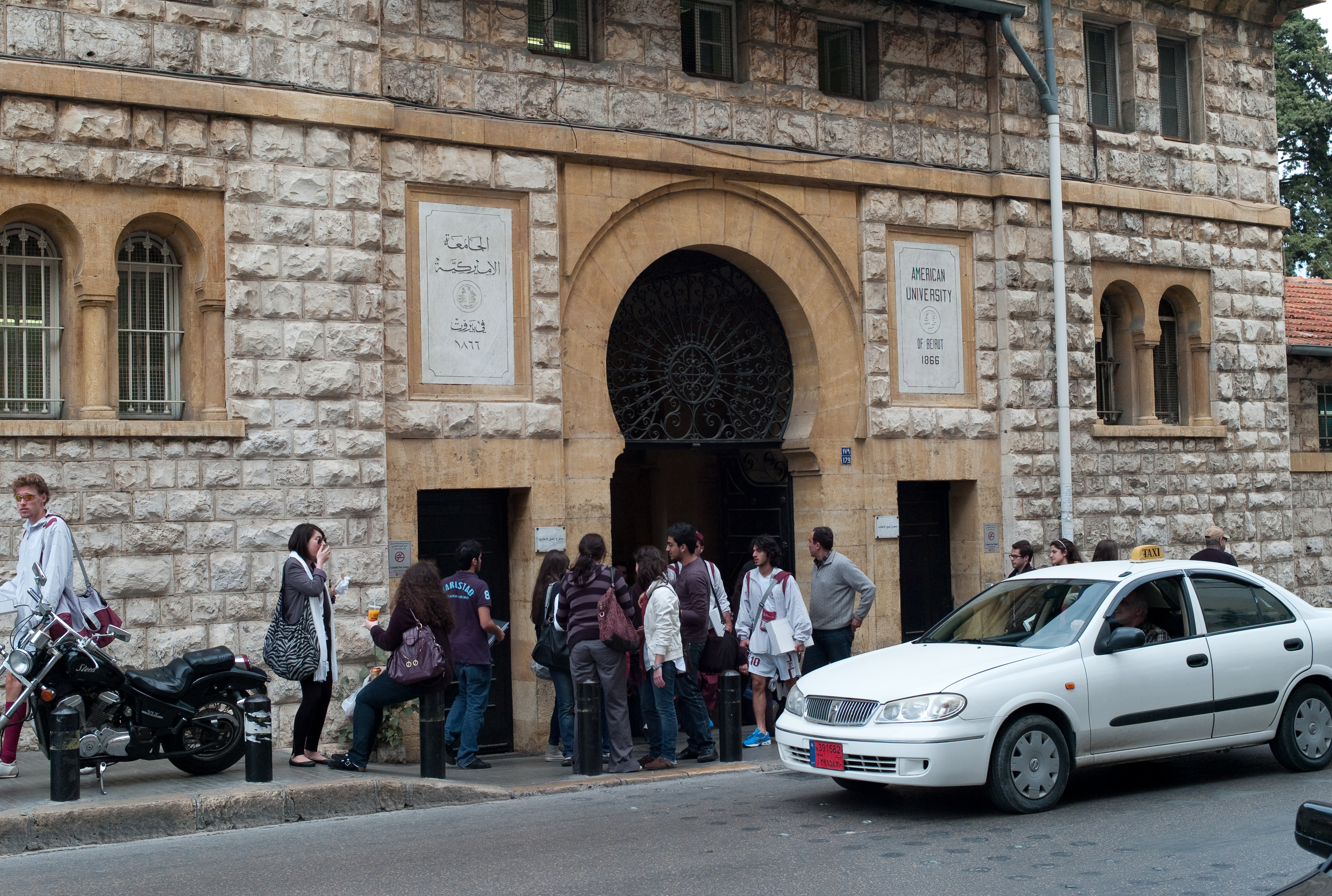
The entrance to AUB from Bliss Street, in Ras Beirut

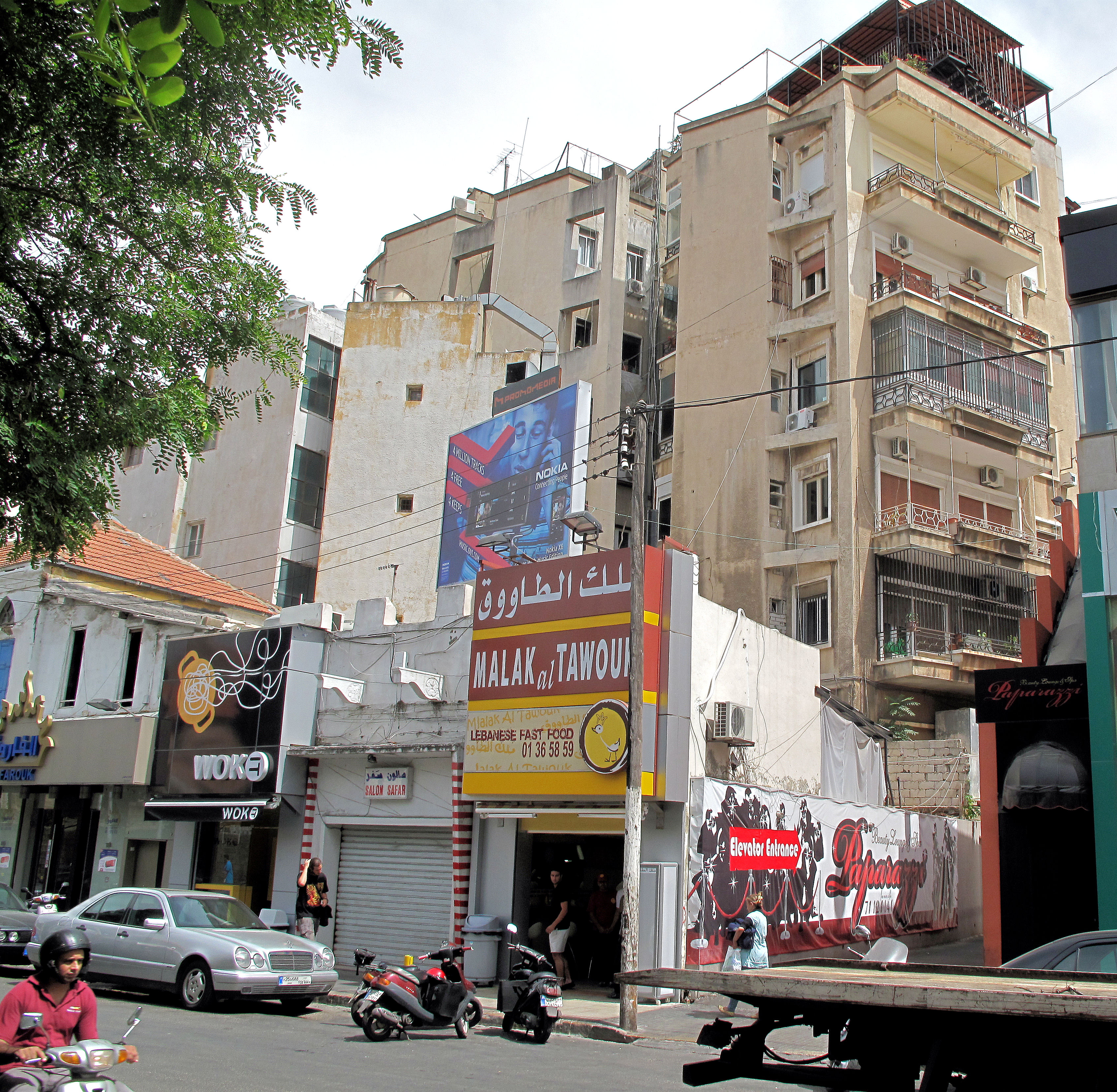
A view of businesses along Bliss St.

Bliss Street, or Rue Bliss, is one of the principal streets of the Hamra area, which is within the Ras Beirut District of Beirut in Lebanon. The street, which is parallel to Hamra Street, runs east-west, connecting with Rue Clémenceau on the east and ending at Avenue General Charles de Gaulle that runs along the coast of the Mediterranean.

The street is named after Daniel Bliss, an American missionary who founded the American University of Beirut. Prior to the mid-1960s, the tram passed along Bliss Street and stopped in front of AUB's Main Gate.

On the other side it is lined with many historical and commercial buildings that house cafes, restaurants, pubs as well as bookstores. Bliss Street has one of the largest concentration of restaurants in Beirut, such as Roadster's and Urbanista, in addition to Uncle Sam's and Bliss House, that cater to the university students who hang out on the street.

== In literature ==
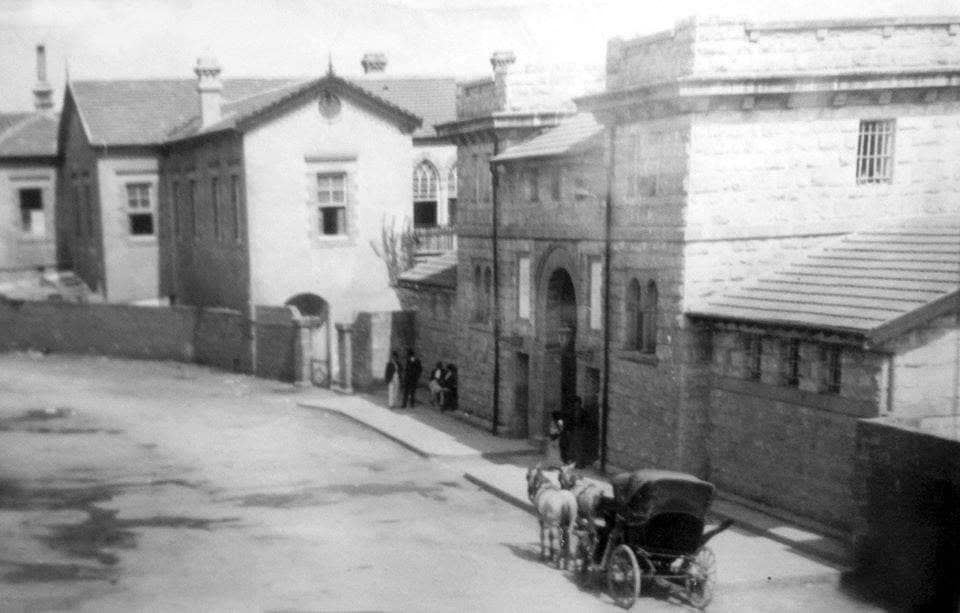
AUB main gate in 1895

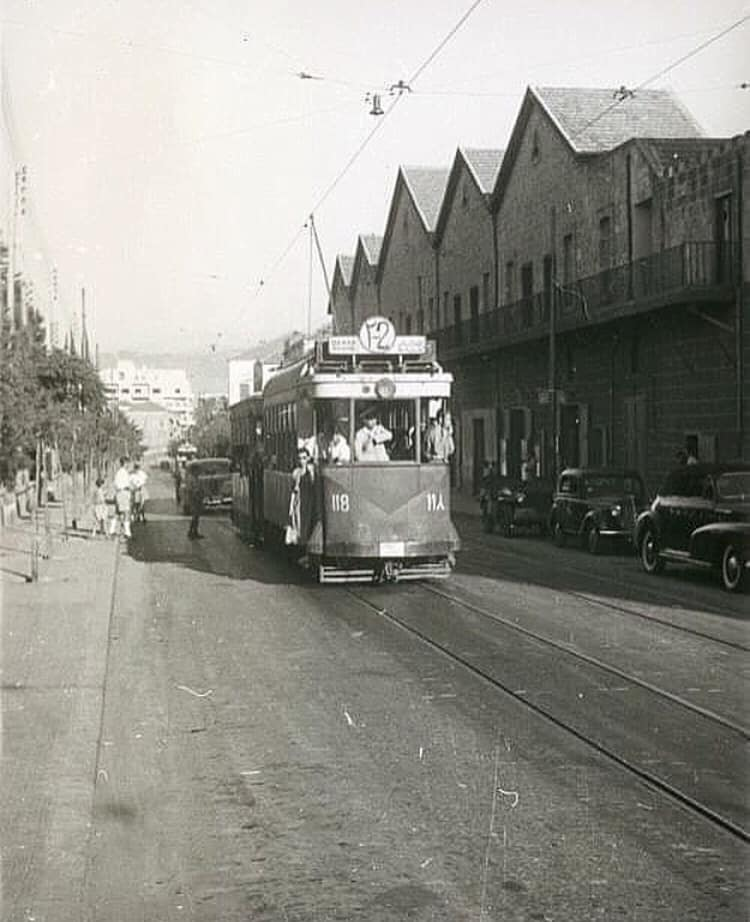
Beirut Tramway in Bliss Street

- Never by Blood By Noel Carroll

"They were on Shari Bliss, or Bliss Street, and closing in on the American University of Beirut, their first destination of the day."
