= Raoul Desribes =

Reverend Father Raoul Desribes (born in 1856, died in 1940) was a French Jesuit archaeologist notable for his work on prehistory in Lebanon, particularly the archaeological site of Minet Dalieh at Ras Beirut. He found two paleolithic bone harpoons.
