= Juliana Seraphim =

Palestinian painter

Juliana Seraphim (Arabic: جوليانا ساروفيم; born 1934 in Jaffa, Mandatory Palestine; died 2005 Beirut, Lebanon) was a Palestinian painter. She was a refugee in Sidon, displaced after the 1948 war. She gained prominence in Palestinian, Lebanese, and later, international art spheres for her unique surrealist art style which incorporated themes of homeland, femininity, memory, and identity.

== Biography ==
Seraphim was born in 1934 in Jaffa, Mandatory Palestine. At the age of 14, her family was displaced by Arab Israeli war and subsequently fled by boat to Sidon, Southern Lebanon. There, she attended a Catholic boarding school for three years. Seraphim was among the first waves of Palestinian refugees relocate to Beirut, Lebanon in 1952. Upon being displaced, she worked as a secretary at UNRWA while simultaneously attending art classes.

== Education and career ==
In Beirut, Seraphim developed her personal style and began to produce some of her most notable works. She studied under the Lebanese painter Jean Khalifé, exhibiting her works for the first time in his studio. After studying at the Lebanese Academy of Fine Arts and independently with other local contemporary artists, she began to exhibit her work in solo exhibitions, gaining fame through her association with a local set of creators dubbed the Ras Beirut artists. During her tertiary years, she was awarded grants to study abroad in Madrid and Florence. Seraphim began her China ink drawings in Madrid; art critic Carlos Adriane suggested the medium was best suited to Seraphim's surreal imagination.

Seraphim represented Lebanon in three biennials - Alexandria (1962), Paris (1963), and São Paulo (1967). In 1960 Seraphim studied at the Royal Academy of Fernando in Madrid, Spain. In 1965 Seraphim was awarded a scholarship that helped her travel to Paris, where she stayed for two years. Seraphim's exhibitions gained notoriety during this trip, meriting her an appearance in Planete Magazine. Seraphim was published in Hiwar twice, once in Hiwar no. 4 1963 for her illustrations of Leila Balabakki's The Spaceship of Tenderness to the Moon. Seraphim was published a second time in 1967 Hiwar no. 26-27.

In 1971 Seraphim completed Shorewood publishers commission for 27 engravings to illustrate a special de luxe portfolio anthology of the works of nine Nobel Prize writers.

== Visual language ==
=== Artistic motivations ===
Whereas her Lebanese contemporaries often adopted a figurative style to address the central issues of the Palestinian experience, Seraphim's visual language is characterized by complex, undulating layers and improvisational, dream-like imagery. Through this unique style, she created an imaginative realm that allowed her to reimagine her loneliness and social isolation as an unmarried woman artist in a patriarchal society. Art was her joy, and her easel provided safety and serenity away from both society and war. During times of war and heavy shelling in Lebanon, Seraphim described her persistence in creating art and the gradual dissolution of her fear. Her paintings served as a tonic for her continuous struggle for women's rights and a peaceful world. In a 1997 interview with LaTeef Nelda, Seraphim stated, “My motivation is to find God, beauty, serenity — everything that you usually don't find in life. When you live in society, it's a struggle — not only a struggle — it's a battle all day long! On the other hand, when you are with your easel, you have peace, silence, and an unfolding, exploding vision before you.”

=== Stylistic influences ===
Early in life, Juliana Seraphim felt a need to create art. With her family's financial support, she trained in both European Old Master and Eastern artistic traditions, embarking on a journey through abstract, surrealist, materialist, and realist expressions. Starting with illustrations, Seraphim eventually gained recognition both internationally and within the Ras Beirut art circle. Influenced by the spiritualism movements of the 1960s and 70s, her artwork incorporates empowered women within fantastical, elemental realms of architecture and nature. Additionally, Seraphim cited Hieronymus Bosch and Max Ernst as her artistic influences.

=== Fantastical motifs ===
In the aforementioned 1997 interview with LaTeef Nelda, Seraphim detailed her creative process as rooted in both the mundane and the collective unconscious. She walked through the world with a sense of wonder at architecture, fauna and flora, elements, stars, and living beings. Later, she used fantastical architecture to summon shapeshifting muses from her inner sanctum. Her fierce fantasy style drew from early memories of winged angels depicted on ceiling frescoes in her grandfather's convent in Jerusalem. Her family name, Seraphim, traces back to the Hebrew plural of “seraph,” the many-winged guardian angels of God's throne, often represented in Byzantine and Islamic art. By avidly incorporating winged motifs in her bold oil portraits of women, Seraphim captured an intricate connection between her art and self-identity.

=== Feminine imagery ===
Seraphim's iconic image became the surrealist “woman-flower,” reincarnated and reconstructed through each of her artistic periods. She composed dreamlike, fantastical biomorphic subjects that disrupted traditional spatial compositions and bodily forms. Her pieces defy the burden of gravity, elevating her ethereal understanding of the feminine — at times fully visible, at others dissipating into the radiant background. Through this visual language, Seraphim sought to liberate the woman's subconscious and discover her inner being — in essence, embodying sensuality and irrevocable autonomy.

In both Lebanon and France, Seraphim's women subjects asserted their identities in societies that often judged a woman's value based on her relationships with men. Seraphim envisioned the women she painted as “sophisticated and cosmopolitan,” adaptable across cultures and resilient in their struggle against patriarchal oppression. She championed this vision of empowerment within the international art market, where collectors and audiences at times devalued her work simply due to its inherent femininity.

== Exhibition history ==
Below is a selected list of Seraphim's exhibition history.

- 1960: Internationale Art Gallery in Florence, Italy
- 1961: La Licorne Art Gallery, Beirut, Lebanon
- 1964: Elie Garzouzi Gallery, Beirut, Lebanon
- 1965: Galerie Journal l'Orient, Beirut Lebanon
- 1967: Galerie Journal l'Orient, Beirut Lebanon
- 1969: Cassia Art Gallery, Beirut, Lebanon
- 1971: Samir Nassif Art Gallery, Beirut Lebanon
- 1975: Brigitte Shehadeh Gallery, Beirut, Lebanon
- 1977: Tabet Art Gallery, Paris, France
- 1978: Samia Toutoungi Art Gallery, Lebanon; X Art Gallery, Paris, France
- 1979: Galerie Art 3, Paris, France
- 1980: Jordan National Gallery of Fine Arts, Amman, Jordan; Alef Art Gallery, Kuwait
- 1981: Galerie Bekhazi (GAB Center), Beirut, Lebanon
- 1983: Suzanne Ponds Art Gallery, Cannes, France; Galerie Bekhazi (GAB Center), Beirut, Lebanon
- 1985: Gulf Hotel Art Gallery, Qatar; Galerie Art 3, Paris, France
- 1987: Galerie La Toile, Rimal, Beirut, Lebanon
- 1988: Galerie La Toile, Rimal, Beirut, Lebanon
- 1989: Amadis Art Gallery, Madrid, Spain
- 1990: Khayal Gallery, Ehden, Lebanon
- 1991: Hotel Chahba-Cham Art Gallery, Damascus, Syria
- 1992: Station des Arts Gallery, Beirut, Lebanon
- 1993: Station des Arts Gallery, Beirut, Lebanon

Below is a selected list of Seraphim's group exhibition history.

- 1961: Nicolas Sursock Museum, Lebanon
- 1962: Alexandria Biennale, Egypt Barcaccia Gallery, Rome, Italy
- 1963: Paris Biennale, France
- 1965: Sao Paulo Biennale, Brazil
- 1967: Chenil Gallery, London, UK
- 1968: Gallery Motte, Paris, France (exhibited with painters Dubuffet, Kaimakoff, and Luc Simon)
- 1969: First National City Bank, Beirut, Lebanon Smithsonian Institution, Washington D.C., USA
- 1971: Imperial Museum of Tokyo, Japan; Bibliothèque Nationale, Paris, France (exhibited with Picasso and Dalì)
- 1975: Heirlooms Gallery, Alabama, USA
- 1978: Museum of Neuilly, Paris, France
- 1980: Belvedere Museum, Tunis, Tunisia
- 1995: 1995 Al-Majlis Gallery, Dubai, UAE; Intercontinental Hotel, Bahrain; Salon du Printemps, Beirut, Lebanon; National Museum of Kuwait
- 1996: Fine Arts Museum, Sharjah, UAE
- 1997: Salon D’Automne, Sursock Museum, Beirut, Lebanon
- 2012: Art From Lebanon, Beirut Exhibition Center, Beirut, Lebanon
- 2013: Tajreed - A Selection of Arab Abstract Art 1908-1960, CAP Kuwait, Kuwait
- 2016: Lebanon Modern, Les artistes femmes au Liban, curated by Pascal Odile, At the Beirut Art Fair, Beirut, Lebanon
- 2019: (Nothing But) Flowers, Saleh Barakat Gallery, Beirut, Lebanon
- 2020: Art on Paper, Gallery One, Dubai, UAE
- 2022: Beirut and The Golden Sixties: A Manifesto of Fragility. Lyon Museum of Contemporary Art, Lyon, France; Taking Shape: Abstraction from the Arab World, 1950s-1980s. The Block Museum, Chicago, USA The Doche, Seraphim & Barrage: A Search for the Fantastic, Agial Art Gallery, Beirut, Lebanon. In the Eye of the Beholder, Artscoops, Online
- 2023: Partisans of the Nude: An Arab Art Genre in an Era of Contest, 1920-1960. Wallach Art Gallery, Columbia University, USA; Beirut and The Golden Sixties: A Manifesto of Fragility. Mathaf, Arab Museum of Modern Art, Doha, Qatar; Autumn Harvest, Artscoops, Online; FEMININE FUSION: Women of Yesterday and Today, The LT Gallery, Beirut, Lebanon; Paper & Prints, Artscoops, Online; Lebanon Untitled, Cromwell Place, London, UK; Art for Art's Sake, Artscoops, Online; Middle East Moderne & Contemporain, Mark Hachem Gallery, Paris, France

== Awards ==
Below is a list of awards Seraphim received during her career.

- The Florence Prize, Italy
- The Prize of the Ministry of National Education, Lebanon
- The Second Prize for Foreigners at the City of Viarregio, Italy

== Collections ==
Below is a list of Seraphim's collections (as of 2023).

- The MET, New York, USA
- Museum of the City of Viarregio, Italy
- Museum of "La Femme Célèbre", Neuilly Paris, France
- Musée du suréalisme, Paris, France
- Institut du Monda Arabe, Paris, France
- Jordan National Gallery of Fine Arts, Amman, Jordan
- Nicolas Sursock Museum, Beirut, Lebanon
- Ramzi and Saeda Dalloul Art Foundation, Beirut, Lebanon
- The collection of the Ministry of Culture, Beirut, Lebanon
- Barjeel Art Foundation, Sharjah, UAE

== Seraphim's positionality ==
Seraphim often reflected on the introspection that contributed to her artistic process and philosophy. She spoke of her artistic goals and how she sought to represent her tangible experience as a woman through an abstract lens. The quotes shown below detail certain crucial aspects of Seraphim's artistic development process and philosophy around womanhood, as described by the artist herself.

“I started my China ink drawings in Spain. It was the art critic, Carlos Adriane, who suggested this medium as the one best suited to express the imagery of my surreal imagination…and how right he was! An important change occurred in my painting there, too. I began to explore density, the material properties of paint. I started using it sculpturally, building up abstract forms in bas relief on the canvas with sand and other materials. This technique later developed into the paintings of my Byzantine and Phoenician period.”

”The images in my paintings come from deep within me; they are surreal and unexplainable. Consciously I want to portray a woman's world and how important love is to a woman. Few men understand the quality of love a woman seeks. I try to show them.”

”For a while there were singing lessons, then poetry, and also a brief venture into sculpture. ‘For some reason I avoided painting,’ she says. ’Without understanding why, I was afraid even to try. Maybe the memory of those grand paintings in my grandfather's house still intimidated me, put art on a pedestal higher than my dreams dared to reach. They portrayed a mysterious world — birds, animals, trees, moons, faces…all exotic and foreign, fascinating, and a bit frightening to a child's imagination. Maybe that mystic world still dominated my unconscious, and I wasn't ready to open that door yet, to go so deeply into myself.”

”I was still the responsible, obedient daughter; but more and more, painting became my real world. When I was offered a scholarship to study art in Europe, I decided to go.”

“Men just don't understand the needs of a woman. When she is in love, she is a delicate, fragile flower, easily bruised. How many men have the sensitivity to know this? This was what I wanted to express in my ‘Femme Fleury paintings, the emotional and psychological fragility of a woman. The two men in my life who I would have married failed me, just couldn't fulfill all my needs — the ‘flower’ woman in me, and the artist. They were afraid of both...the woman was too complicated, and the artist was too independent.”

== See also ==
- Palestinian Art
- Palestinians
- Palestine
- 1948 Palestinian expulsion and flight
- Nakba
- List of Palestinian Woman Artists
- Surrealism
