= Jumana El Husseini =

Palestinian painter and sculptor (1932–2018)

Jumana El-Husseini
- جمانة الحُسيني
- Born: April 2, 1932; Jerusalem, Mandatory Palestine
- Died: April 11, 2018 (aged 86); Paris, France
- Education: Beirut College for Women; American University of Beirut; École Nationale Supérieure des Beaux-Arts
- Known for: Painting, Sculpture, Ceramics, Embroidery; depictions of Jerusalem; evolution from realistic to geometric and abstract styles; blending oil painting with embroidery.
- Style: Figurative, Geometric, Abstract, Calligraphic
- Movement: Ras Beirut artists (affiliated)
- Children: 3
- Relatives: Hajj Amin al-Husseini (grandfather)

Jumana El-Husseini (Arabic: جمانة الحُسيني; 2 April 1932 – 11 April 2018) was a Palestinian painter and sculptor born in Jerusalem, who later lived in Paris. She won many medals and has an extensive international exhibition record. Jumana El-Husseini died in her home in Paris on 11 April 2018 at the age of 86.

She studied painting, sculpture and ceramics in Beirut and Paris. Noted for figurative paintings of Palestinian women and geometric houses in Jerusalem and Jericho, her style evolved from realistic to geometric and, since 1987, to abstract, with wavelike overpainted drawings evoking Arabic calligraphy.

== Personal life ==
Jumana El-Husseini was born to a prominent Palestinian family. Her grandfather, Hajj Amin El-Husseini, was the Grand Mufti of Jerusalem in the Mandate era and an important figure in the resistance against British and Zionist colonial rule.

In 1948, El-Husseini and her family were forced to leave Palestine as a result of the 1948 Nakba and they resettled in Beirut, Lebanon. In 1950, El-Husseini married Orfan Bayazod. They had three sons.

== Career ==
In 1953, El-Husseini began attending classes for an undergraduate degree in political science at the Beirut College for Women (now known as the Lebanese American University). Not long after beginning at the Beirut College for Women, she transferred to the American University of Beirut to study art. Around this time, in 1954, the American University of Beirut established the Department of Fine Arts, which was the first institution in Lebanon to offer academic art classes. In 1957, El Husseini graduated from AUB and in 1960, participated in her first group exhibition at the Sursock Museum.

During her time in Beirut, El-Husseini came to be involved with a group of local artists termed by Palestinian historian Kamal Boullata the Ras Beirut artists.

In 1964 and 1967 she also participated in Sursock's Salon d’Automne and in the Biennali of Alexandria in 1969, Kuwait in 1973, Baghdad in 1974 and in Venice in 1979.

Over the course of her career, throughout four decades, El-Husseini would go on show her work in solo and group shows in over thirty different countries. Her work is currently held in private and museum collections around the world, including the Barjeel Art Foundation, and the Dalloul Art Foundation.

== Artistic Style ==
El-Husseini's art is centred around depictions of Jerusalem, often using geometric patterns and repetitive motifs. Her paintings of Jerusalem are often depicted without any people within it and have a dreamy feel to them. Common motifs in her work are "...horses, which always find their way home; butterflies, which are never caged; and pomegranates, symbols of fertility and good luck." She employs various materials in her practice from painting to sculpture to ceramics and embroidery. Later in her career, her work became increasingly abstract creating mixed media pieces using shapes, words and "scribbles". In her earlier works are typically more colorful than her later works, which are darker as well as more abstracted. Significantly, El-Husseini often combined oil painting with embroidery which blurred the distinction between fine art practice and craft, which was often had a "lesser than" connotation. Throughout her artistic career, her work explored her relationship to her home city, Jerusalem, and her relationship both with the city and her forced displacement from it.

The materiality and subject matter of her work was also impacted by the political events surrounding her. During the Lebanese Civil war, when she wasn't able to access oil paint, she began to work with watercolors instead. Later on, she refrained from painting all together and turned to embroidery. Her work from this time explores her family history and images from her childhood. In 1982, when she was forced to relocate to Paris due to the Israeli invasion of Lebanon during the Lebanese Civil War, she began to use Arabic calligraphy in her work as a way of representing "letters to my mother who is buried in Jerusalem." In 1991 while living in Paris, she began to experiment with stained glass and studied at the École Nationale Supérieure des Beaux-Arts.

== Notable exhibitions ==
=== Solo exhibitions ===
Galerie Joëlle Mortier Valat, Paris, France (2004)

Darat Al Funun, Amman, Jordan (2002)

Al Ma’mal Gallery, Jerusalem, Palestine (2002)

Qattan Foundation, Ramallah, Palestine (2002)

Anadil Gallery, Jerusalem, Palestine (1993)

Arab Heritage Gallery, Dhahran, Saudi Arabia (1984)

Woodstock Gallery, London, UK (1965)

=== Group exhibitions ===
Rituals of Signs and Transitions (1975-1995), Darat Al Funun, Amman, Jordan (2015)

Tajreed, CAP, Kuwait, Kuwait (2013)

Nabad Gallery, Amman, Jordan (2008)

Jordan National Gallery of Fine Arts, Amman, Jordan (2002)

Institut du monde arabe, Paris, France (1989)

== See also ==
- Palestinian art
