= Sinno family =

Sinno
- Pronunciation: Sinno

Origin
- Language: Arabic
- Region of origin: Beirut, Lebanon, Morocco

The Sinno Family (Arabic: عائلة سنو) is a Lebanese family, considered one of Beirut's oldest families, and is said to be descending from the Muslim Leader Tarek bin Sinno.

The Sinno Family members mainly reside in the Lebanese capital Beirut as well as its suburbs such as Aramoun, Bchamoun, Doha, Naama and Choueifat. They reside also in Saida, in other cities such as Damascus and Aleppo, and in Arbeen village and Amman in Jordan.

== Name Origin and History ==
Several explanations and writings about the origin of the name and here is a list of the most known explanations:

- Rashed hamze Sinno:

In his book "The Sinno Family: History and Statistics" 1983, Bahaa Al Din suggests that the family name's original spelling was “Sunna” or “Sinno” and there is a third spelling possibility, including the name of “Jude” used by a number of family members without strong evidence.

- Rana Sinno:

Sheikh Taha Al Wali, an important researcher in that field notes that “the original name is “Sunna” and was known ever since the Sunna family migrated to Beirut along with other emigrants from the Maghreb countries, hundreds of years ago. The family resided in the vicinity of the Imam Ouzai. The reputation of commitment to the religion and to the Sunna (doctrine) of the Prophet, made other residents of the city visit them for the blessing they would get. The family name progressively changed to Sinno, which became the surname of the family for over a century now. The only evidence and written documents we have encountered in that regard, are the records of the Sharia Court”.

- Aya sinno

Number of families from Beirut came originally from Maghrebin descend, particularity those whose surnames end with “o” instead of the formal Arabic suffix “i”, or the Turkish suffix “gi”. The Sinno family in particular emigrated from the Moroccan city of Fes. The Sinno family was indisputably known for its strong support of the Sunna, which is as old as its roots in the Maghreb. The word Sunna was then merged with the usual Maghrebin suffix “o” which transformed the surname to Sinno. Therefore, historians usually correct the spelling from Sinno to Sunno, in line with the reasons above to avoid confusion with any other Arabic words such as “tooth” or “age”.

== Family Association ==
After a small fight between two Sinno members who don't know each other, a meeting was held in the house of Hajj Hassan Sinno attended by many family members where they establish the "Sinno Family Association". The first Administrative Board was established as a result; it was presided by Mohammad Radhi Bin Abdul Hameed Sinno, with Ahmad Abdul Qader Sinno as Vice President, Muneer Saleem Sinno as Secretary, and Mohammad Subhi Rahdi as second Secretary. It was noted that all four members derived from Abdul Qader branch of the family. In 1921, the first Charter was issued with the slogan “Fraternity, Aid, Education”. The first statistics for the family were issued also that year in a booklet prepared by Muneer Saleem Sinno, however, those statistics covered only the male members and excluded all females.

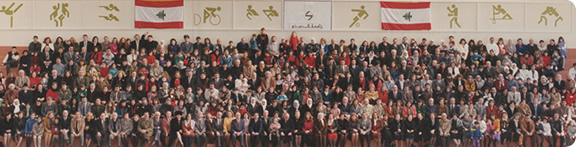
Sinno gathering picture during Sinno League meeting

== Administrative Boards ==
The First Administrative Board remained in charge until 1937, and its activities were limited to charity, aid and family connections.

On December 1, 1937, the second Charter prepared by Lawyer Tawfiq Sinno was issued, and a Second Administrative Board of 23 members was elected as follows:

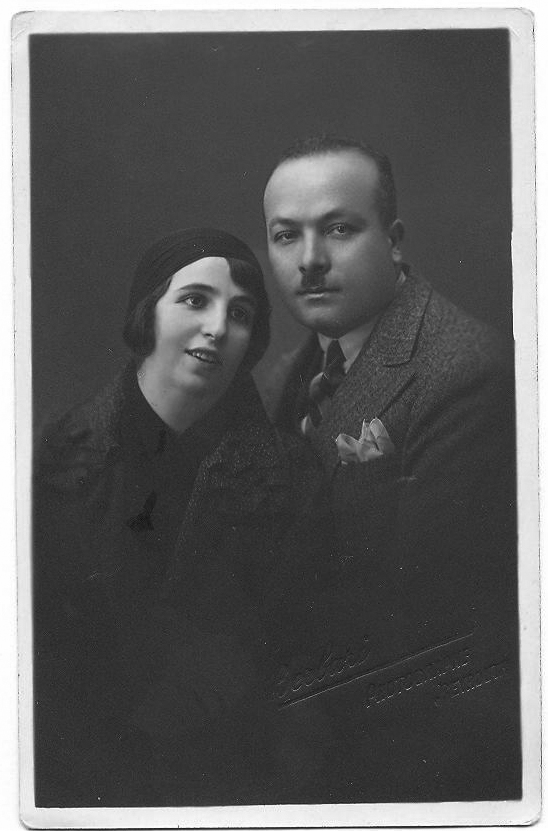
Picture showing Dr Malih Sinno with his Wife. Dr Malih was the 2nd President of the Sinno Family League.

- Dr. Malih Sinno, President
- Tawfic Ali Sinno, Vice President
- Muneer Saleem Sinno, Secretary
- Mohammad Abdul Qader Sinno, Treasurer
- Members: Saeed Sinno, Fuad Abdul Fattah Sinno, Aref Hamzeh Sinno, Jameel Othman Sinno, Ahmad Abdul Qader Sinno, Arslan Khalil Sinno, Mohammad Abdul Hafeez Sinno, Mohammad Ali Sinno, Rasheed Ameen Sinno, Mahmood Hassan Sinno, Subhi Radhi Sinno, Yahya Hamza Sinno, Abdul Badih Saleem Sinno, Mohammad Jameel Sinno, Abdul Kareem Sinno, Shafeeq Jameel Sinno, Mohammad Hassan Sinno, Muhieddeen Hamza Sinno, Mustapha Hamza Sinno.

The former president, Mr. Mohammad Radhi Sinno was appointed Honorary President.

In 1940, a Third Administrative Board presided by Fouad Abdul Fatah Sinno was elected, however, no information besides this was provided about it. The late Bahauddeen Rashed Sinno mentions in his book entitled: “The Sinno Family, History and Statistics”, that a conflict arose among the members of the Board. This conflict limited the Board's public activities to minor formal visits such as the one paid to the President of the Republic Sheikh Bechara El Khoury and Prime Minister Riad as-Solh to ask for their intervention to free Rasheed Ameen Sinno (a Family Board Member in 1937), Media Manager in Sanaa, who was arrested and accused of belonging to the Free Front in the Kingdom of Yemen. This was the group that executed an armed coup which lead to the assassination of the President, Imam Yehya Bin Hameeduddeen in 1948. The efforts of the Lebanese officials were successful and Rasheed was released as a result.

The Association went on passively until 1964, when a number of young family members gathered in the residence of Dr. Wafeeq Musbah Sinno in Khaldeh and decided to revive the association and its activities after it was inhibited for a long time. On the Day of Eid Al Fitr of the same year, another meeting was held in the residence of Baheej Hassan Sinno. Many family members attended that meeting, and they all unanimously hoped and requested for action to activate the association.

The Fourth Administrative Board for this new stage included 12 members, namely:

- Dr. Wafic Musbah Sinno, President
- Mr. Rasheede Ameen Sinno, Vice President
- Mr. Ameen Mustapha Sinno, Secretary
- Mr. Baheej Hassan Sinno, Representative to the Government
- Mr. Mohammad Ahmad Saleem Sinno, Treasurer
- Members: Hassan Abdul Qader Sinno, Rasheed Afeef Sinno, Engineer Assem Abdul Badih Sinno, Rashed Saleem Sinno, Aoun Saleem Sinno, Engineer Hesham Abdul Badih Sinno.
An aerial panoramic view of Beirut sometime in the last third of the 19th century

== Sinno Family League ==
Successive Board elections took place in 1969, 1971, 1977, 1981, 1982, 1989, 1991, 1992, 1993 and 1997. In 1998, amendments to the Charter were ratified, among which was increasing the number of Board members to 24, and changing the official name of the association to the “Sinno Family League”. A new Board was formed consequently as follows:

- Prof. Wafic Sinno, President
- Raji Yahya Sinno, Vice President
- Lawyer Ameen Mustapha Sinno, Representative to the Government
- Awatef Muhieddeen Sinno, Secretary
- Mohammad Ahmad Othman Sinno, Treasurer
- Issam Abdul Qader Sinno, Accountant
- Engineer Hesham Abdul Badih Sinno, General Coordinator
- Members: Najla Sinno Tabbara, Aida Mohammad Sinno, Nada Mahmood Sinno Houri, Heba Shbaro Sinno, Jehad Baheej Sinno, Khalil Ahmad Sinno, Rasheed Afeef Sinno, Ali Wajeeh Sinno, Dr. Faisal Badreddeen Sinno, Malik Wajeeh Sinno, Mohammad Ahmad Sinno, Nabeel Shafeeq Sinno, Dr. Abdul Raoof Muhieddeen Sinno, Mohammad Mahmood Sinno, Mohammad Khaled Muhieddeen Sinno.

== Goals of the League ==
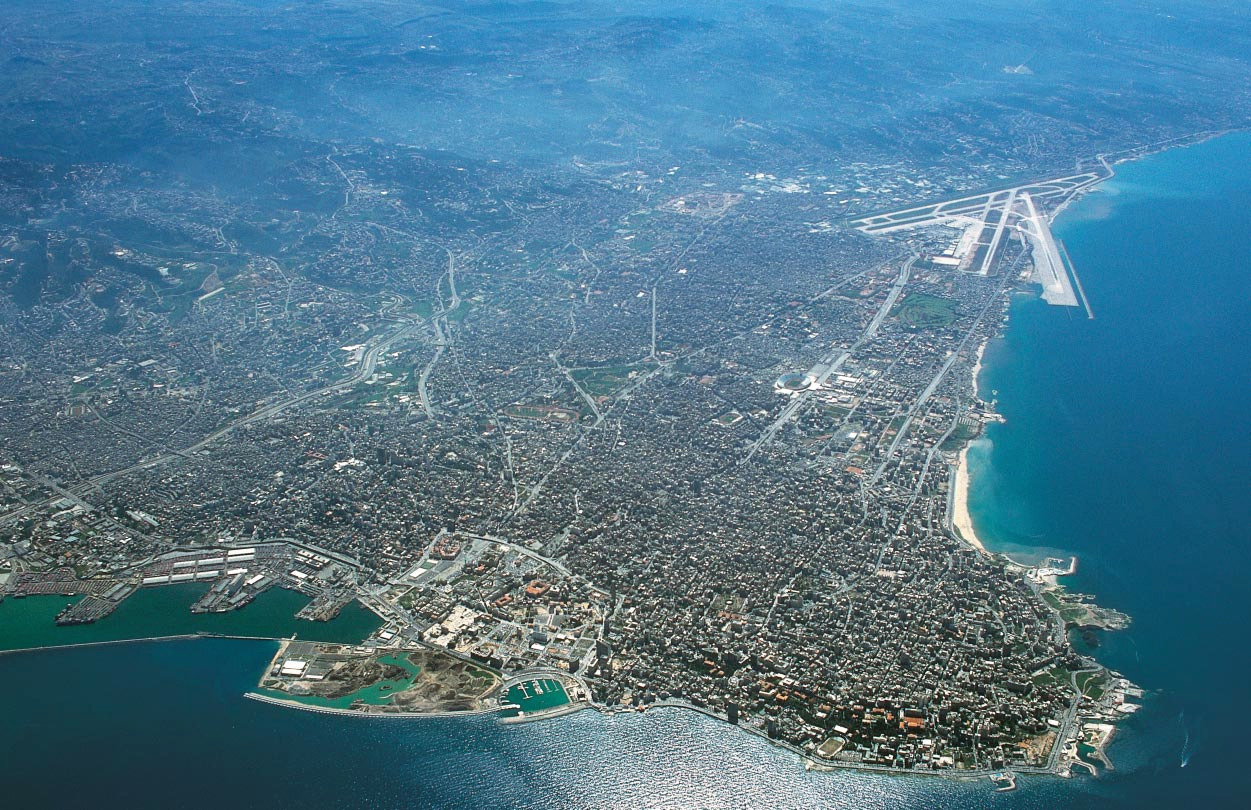
Picture showing Beirut, the capital of Lebanon and the city where most of the Sinnos reside.

The objective of the establishment of this association is to consider the various ways of bringing benefit to the Sinno Family, improving the educational level within the family, organizing gatherings with returns to family members, and literature, health and history lectures, in addition to other events of public interest.

In the system of 1965, the second item stipulated that the objective of the Association is to bring family members together, and create bonding among them. It is also to improve the standing of the family in general and of every individual member of it. It also aims at socially organizing the family and offering help and aid to entitled members.

The second item of the 1998 system adopted the objectives stated in the 1965 system, with the addition of the last statement: “to encourage the productive and outstanding individuals of the family and to develop their potentials and abilities of each one of them”. The slogan of the association was also amended to become: “Fraternity- Education- Development”.

The third item of the system of 2007 however, defines the objectives as follows:

- Bringing the family members together and creating strong bonding among them.
- Increasing awareness among the family members with a focus on education and counseling.
- Socially organizing the family.
- Offering help and aid to the members entitled for that.
- Developing the potentials and abilities of the family members and encouraging the achievers among them.

== Gathering ==
Gathering in Khaldeh-Lebanon of the Sinno family back in 1964

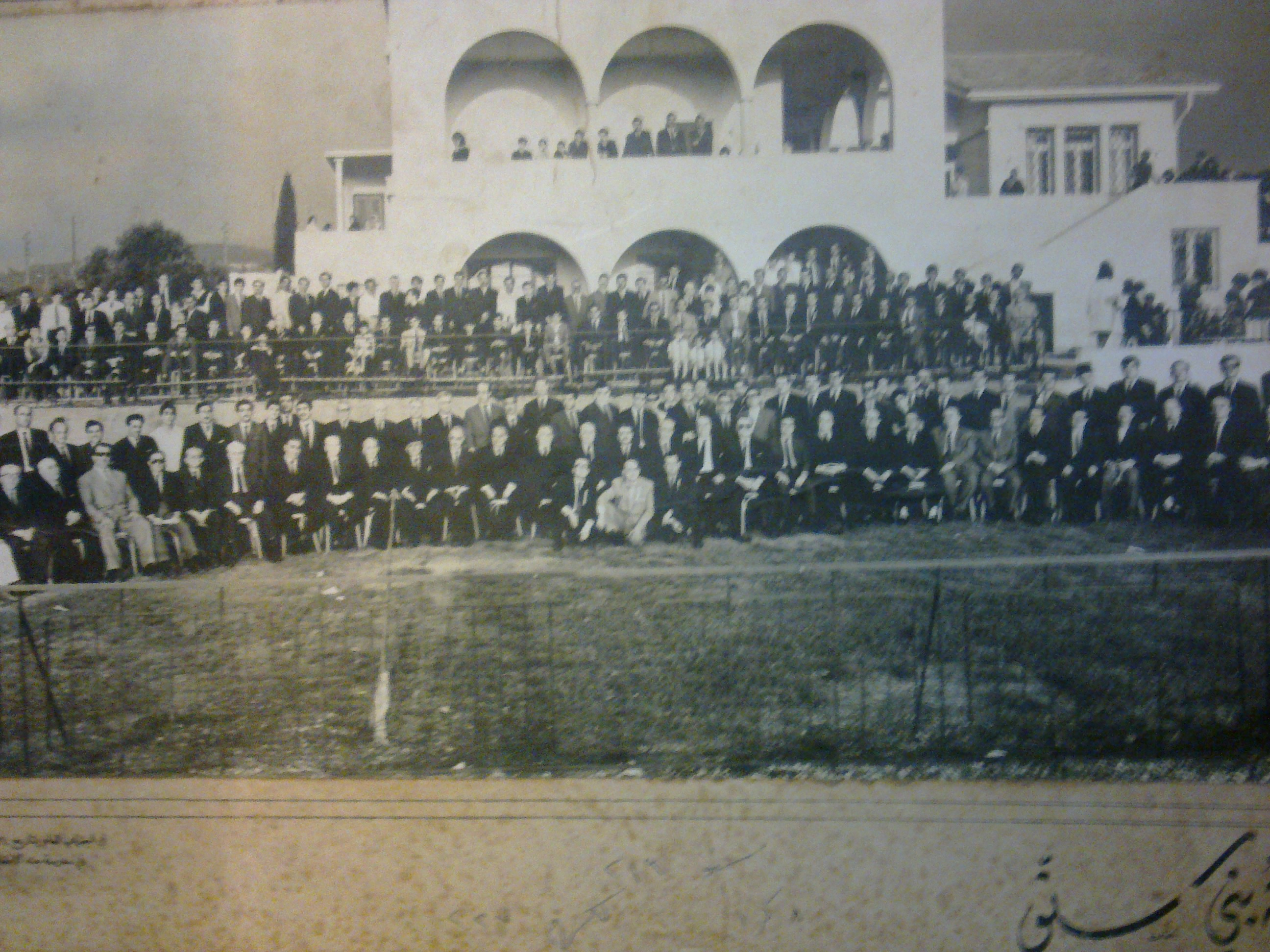
Gathering in Khaldeh-Lebanon of the Sinno family back in 1964

== Committees ==
Four committees were founded in 1965 in the system of the Sinno League and now there is around 9 committees and the most active ones are Culture and Education Committee, Social Committee and Youth Committee.
