= Statue of Charles de Gaulle =

Statue of Charles de Gaulle may refer to:

- Statue of Charles de Gaulle (London)
- Statue of Charles de Gaulle (Warsaw)

== See also ==
- Charles de Gaulle Monument (Moscow)
