= List of things named after Charles de Gaulle =

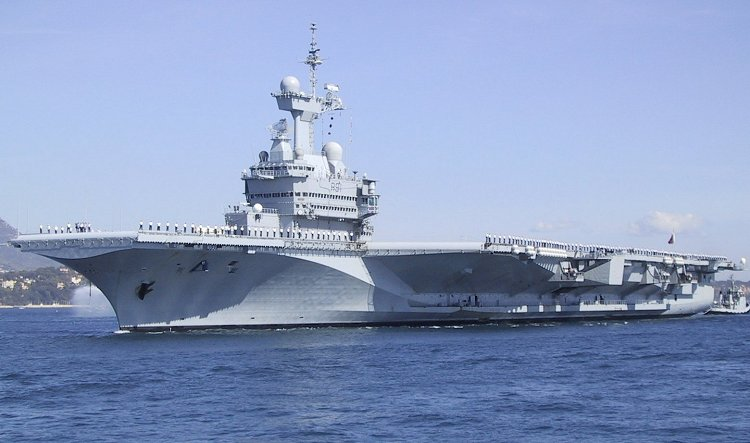
Charles de Gaulle (R 91), France's only active aircraft carrier

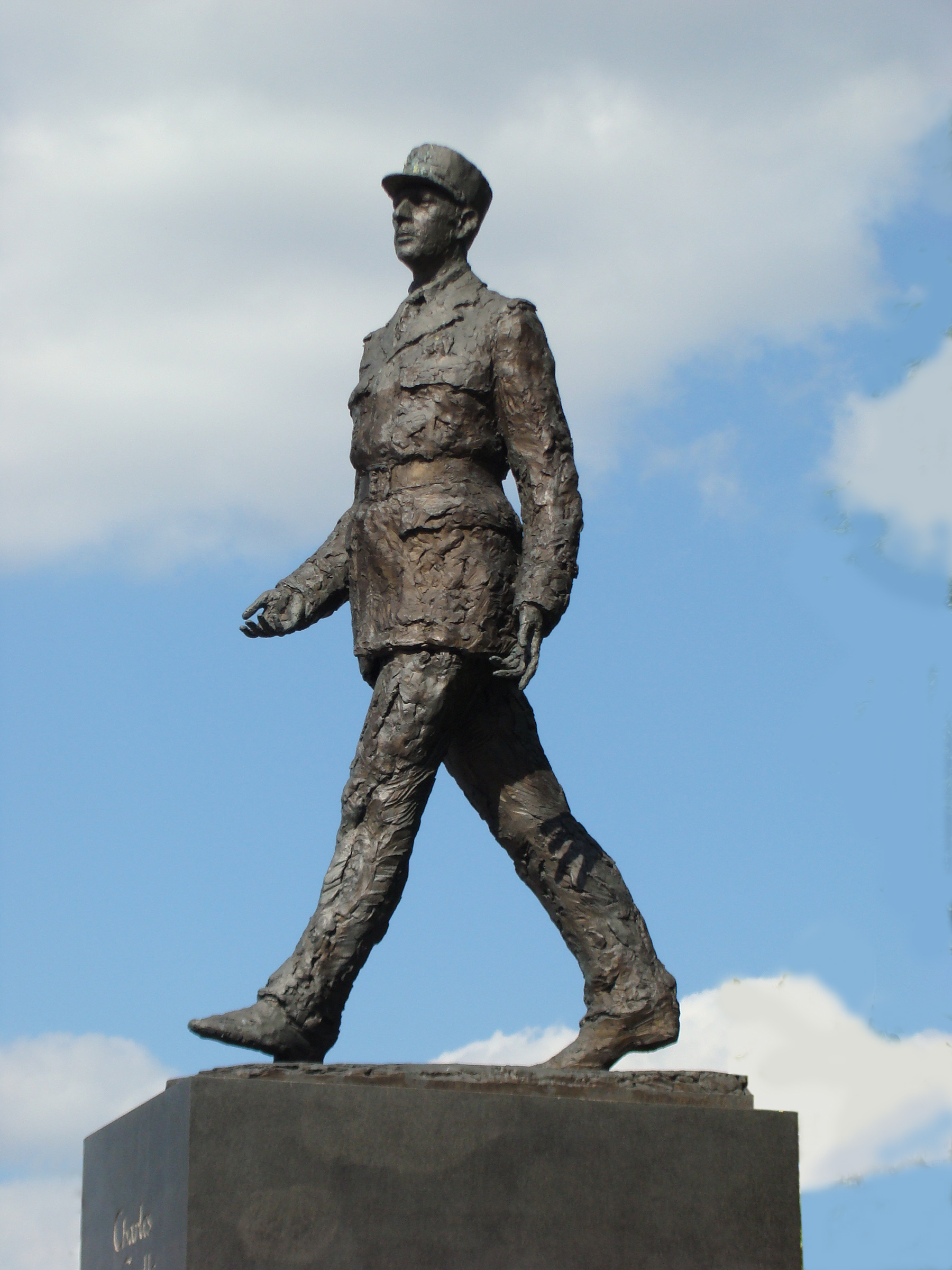
A statue of de Gaulle stands facing Rondo de Gaulle'a in Warsaw, Poland. It is identical to the one near Champs-Élysées – Clemenceau and the Élysée Palace, in Paris.

In France, and around the world, many things have been named after Charles de Gaulle.

== France ==
Many streets and public buildings in France bear the name of Charles de Gaulle. They include:

- Paris Charles de Gaulle Airport
- Charles de Gaulle, an aircraft carrier in the Marine Nationale
- Place Charles de Gaulle, historically known as the Place de l'Étoile, the name of the large plaza around the Arc de Triomphe in Paris. It is frequently referred to as Charles de Gaulle – Étoile, which is the name of the Métro and RER station under it.
- Avenue Charles de Gaulle, Neuilly, the extension of one of the many avenues in Paris that radiate from the Charles de Gaulle-Étoile
- In addition, a large number of cities and towns in France have a street and/or a square named after de Gaulle. Considering the number of towns where this is the case, it would be impractical to attempt to list them all here.

== Outside France ==
De Gaulle is also commemorated outside France, particularly in street names. These include:

- Belgium
  - Place Charles de Gaulle (Antoing)
  - Avenue du Général de Gaulle (Brussels)
  - Place Charles de Gaulle (Mouscron)
  - Charles de Gaullestraat (Ronse)
  - Place Charles de Gaulle (Verviers)
  - Pont Charles de Gaulle (Dinant)
- Brazil
  - Rua Charles de Gaulle (Joinville)
  - Rua General de Gaulle (Osasco )
  - Rua Charles de Gaulle (São Luís)
  - Avenida General Charles de Gaulle (São Paulo)
  - Rua General Charles de Gaulle (Boa Viagem, Recife)
- Cambodia
  - Charles de Gaulle Boulevard (Phnom Penh)
  - Charles de Gaulle Street (Siem Reap)
- Cameroon
  - Avenue du Général de Gaulle (Douala)
- Chad
  - Avenue Charles de Gaulle (N'djamena)
- Canada
  - Boulevard De Gaulle (Lorraine)
  - Charles-De Gaulle bridge (Montreal)
  - Place Charles-De Gaulle (Montréal)
  - Charles de Gaulle Obelisk (Montreal)
  - Avenue De Gaulle (Québec)
  - Rue De Gaulle (Longueuil)
- Chile
  - Avenida Charles de Gaulle (Arica)
  - Calle Charles de Gaulle (Valparaíso)
  - Calle General de Gaulle (Santiago, Chile)
- Côte d'Ivoire
  - Avenue du Général de Gaulle (Abidjan)
- Czech Republic
  - Charlese de Gaulla (Prague)
- Dominican Republic
  - Avenida Charles de Gaulle (Santo Domingo)
- Egypt
  - Charles de Gaulle Avenue, formerly known as Giza Street, in the Giza area of Cairo
- Ethiopia
  - General De Gaulle Square (Addis Ababa)
- Germany
  - Charles de Gaulle Avenue (Berlin)
  - École de Gaulle-Adenauer (Bonn)
  - Charles de Gaulle Straße (Bonn)
  - Charles-de-Gaulle-Platz (Cologne)
  - Charles de Gaulle Straße (Erkelenz)
  - Charles de Gaulle Straße (Landau in der Pfalz)
  - Charles de Gaulle Straße (Munich)
  - Charles de Gaulle Straße (Weißenburg)
  - Charles de Gaulle Straße (Wertheim am Main)
  - Charles de Gaulle Straße (Wiesbaden)
- Italy
  - Via Charles De Gaulle Licata
- Lebanon
  - Avenue General de Gaulle (Beirut)
- Paraguay
  - Calle Charles de Gaulle (Asunción)
- Mauritius
  - Charles De Gaulle Street (Beau Bassin)
- Mexico
  - Parque Charles de Gaulle (Guadalajara)
  - Calle Charles de Gaulle, (Naucalpan)
- Montenegro
  - Bulevar Šarla de Gola (Podgorica)
- Netherlands
  - De Gaullelaan (Delft)
  - De Gaullestraat (Doetinchem)
  - De Gaullesingel (Ede)
  - Generaal de Gaullelaan (Eindhoven)
  - Charles de Gaullestraat (Roermond)
  - Charles de Gaullestraat (Rotterdam)
- Poland
  - Rondo gen. Charles’a de Gaulle’a (Warsaw)
  - Aleja Generała Charles’a de Gaulle’a (Wałbrzych)
  - Ulica Charles’a de Gaulle’a (Malbork)
  - Szkoła im. Charles' de Gaulle’a (Gimnazjum nr 122 w Warszawie) (Warsaw)
  - Szkoła im. Charles' de Gaulle’a (Szkoła Podstawowa nr 56, Gimnazjum z Oddziałami Dwujęzycznymi numer 29 i XVI LO) (Poznań)
  - Ulica Charles’a de Gaulle’a (Gdańsk)
  - Ulica Charles’a de Gaulle’a (Tychy)
  - Pomnik Charles'a de Gaulle'a (Warsaw)
  - Pomnik Charles’a de Gaulle’a przy Domu Muzyki i Tańca, tablica pamiątkowa z wizyty (Zabrze)
  - Ulica Charles’a de Gaulle’a (Zabrze)
- Romania
  - Piaţa Charles de Gaulle (Bucharest)
- Russia
  - Charles de Gaulle Square (Moscow)
- Senegal
  - Boulevard du Général de Gaulle (Dakar)
- Spain
  - Carrer de Gaulle (San Fulgencio)
- South Africa
  - Charles de Gaulle Crescent (Centurion, Gauteng)
- Turkey
  - Dögol Caddesi (Ankara)
  - Lycée Français Charles de Gaulle, Ankara
- United Kingdom
  - Lycée Français Charles de Gaulle (London)
- United States
  - De Gaulle Street (North and South) (Aurora, Colorado, Fort Worth, Texas)
  - De Gaulle Place (El Paso, TX)
  - De Gaulle Street (Iowa City, IA)
  - General De Gaulle Drive (Algiers, New Orleans, Louisiana)
  - De Gaulle Court (Youngstown, OH)
- Uruguay
  - Rbla. Pte. Charles De Gaulle (Montevideo)

== People ==
- Charles de Gaulle, former member of the European Parliament for the National Front Party, was named after his grandfather.

== See also ==
- Names and terms of address used for Charles de Gaulle
