= Adib al-Jarf =

Syrian combat pilot

Brigadier General Adib Al-Jerf
- Native name: أديب الجرف
- Born: May 6, 1946; Salamiyah, Syria
- Died: October 26, 2021 (aged 75) Salamiyah
- Cause of death: Complications from COVID-19
- Allegiance: Ba'athist Syria
- Branch: Syrian Air Force
- Service years: 1964–1990s
- Rank: Brigadier General
- Conflicts: October War
- Awards: Hero of the Syrian Arab Republic; Order of Civil Merit

Adib Ajib al-Jarf (Arabic: أديب عجيب الجرف) (May 6, 1946 – October 26, 2021) was a Syrian fighter pilot ace and military officer, who was awarded the Hero of the Syrian Arab Republic for shooting down several Israeli aircraft in the 1973 October War.

== Career ==
Adib al-Jarf was born to an Ismaili family in Salamiyah in 1946. He joined the Kuweires Military Aviation Institute and served in the Air Force as a combat pilot in the combat aviation branch on the Soviet MiG-21 fighter.

He began his service with the rank of pilot officer student in 1964 and retired with the rank of brigadier general. In the October War, he shot down seven Israeli planes: two French-made Mirage jets and five F-4 Phantom planes. One of the planes was shot down over Ramlet al-Baida in the Lebanese capital Beirut, and another on the road to Bikfaya. During his service, he received several medals, including the coveted Hero of the Syrian Arab Republic & the Order of Civil Merit of the Syrian Arab Republic which he was personally given by Hafez al-Assad himself.

Al-Jarf is also noted to be the youngest individual to reach a flag officer rank in the Syrian Arab Armed Forces.

== Later life ==
Al-Jerf later passed away from COVID-19 in his hometown of Salamiyah in 2021.
