= Villa Meyer =

Villa Meyer (1925–1926) is an unbuilt project which was supposed to be built in Neuilly-sur-Seine, in downtown Paris. Four designs were created for this house by Swiss-French architect Le Corbusier, but it was never built. This is the first project into which Le Corbusier incorporated "free plan" and "free facade" into his design. These ideas later become two of Corbusier's famous Five Points of Architecture. Domino Frame is also an outcome of this experimental design, which became the dominant design concept of Corbusier's later works.

Most of the design drawings are published in the Le Corbusier File, a book that collects most of Le Corbusier's work. Forty-three plans were collected under the name of "Villa Meyer."

== Four Versions ==
=== April–May, 1925 ===
For the first version of the Villa Meyer, Le Corbusier chose a plot on Avenue Madrid. The plan is characterized by its "ring" feature, which creates a continuous central ramp extending to the top of the house. The entire house is built around the ramp. The house includes a central hall, affording a high degree of privacy to the occupants.

=== October, 1925 ===
The second version incorporated significant changes. The centralized plan was replaced with a rectangular plan. The cored ramp was also replaced with an attached spiral ramp. In this design, Corbusier also utilized another design methodology, the rhythmic component of the "bay module". He defined three type of bay to construct the house, Bay A which is 5 meters, B is 2.5 meters and C is around 1.25-1.5 meters. In this project he used CABAB and CAAA as two kinds of spatial arrangement.

=== April, 1926 ===
In the third design, the spiral ramp is removed, and the "A, B, C" bay arrangement became the most important thesis in this project.

=== June 1926 ===
This is the final project for Villa Meyer. This project is more focused on the overhang roof garden and the "A, B, C" bay arrangement. This was also the first design that used both free facade and free plan. The design includes a ramp connecting the three floors, and a double-height outdoor space incorporated into the building volume.

At this stage, the client hired another architect to design the residence, so we do not know exactly in which location Le Corbuiser wished to construct this house.

== Relationship to landscape and surroundings ==
The gardens and the house of La Folie Saint-James, next to the Bois de Boulogne, are one of the best-known surviving designs by Belanger. Another of Belanger's extant buildings, Bagatelle, is located in the Bois de Boulogne, within close walking distance of the Folie Saint-James, though in its altered post-nineteenth-century state. This area lies next to Avenue Charles de Gaulle, the main axis of Paris, three kilometres (2 mi) from the Arc de Triomphe. The house oriented toward west, opposite direction from downtown Paris.

Behind the swimming pool and service rooms, you would take breakfast... From the boudoir, you have gone up onto a roof with neither slates nor tiles, but a solarium and swimming pool with grass growing between the paving slabs. Above you is the sky. With the surroundings walls, no one could see you. In the evening you would see the stars and the sombre mass of the trees in the Folie St. James. Like Robinson (nearby on the Seine), rather like Carpaccio's paintings. A divertissement... This garden is not a French formal garden but a small wilderness where, thanks to the woods of the Parc St. James, one can imagine oneself far away from Paris.

In 1925, on a drawing for the Villa Meyer project, Le Corbusier depicted in the margins, in a small thumbnail sketch, Belanger's Folie Saint-James while, in a letter to the owners, he described how it lies 'face à un site hautement classique'. He stated his intention of choosing highly oriented plan. One reason was creating this feeling of "away from Paris"; the other reason is the consideration of privacy. Two houses were built adjacent to this house. Privacy became a big consideration in his design. This is also part of his letter to this land owner.

== The Final Rejection ==
Though Le Corbusier was infatuated by this plot and put so much effort, they are still fired him for unknown reasons. This is the letter written by the landowner, Mme Hirtz:

Dear Sir, Given the monetary crisis through which we are passing, I find myself under the obligation of breaking off our discussions. I am very sorry about this, but I hope that it will eventually be possible to reopen them – this is my sincere wish – on my return from holiday.

It is regrettable that this project was never built. But it had a lot of influence on Le Corbusier's later projects, including the Villa Stein-de Monzie and Villa Cook.

== Postscript: a further rejection ==
When Le Corbusier was asked in 1928 to design a house for the writer Victoria Ocampo in Buenos Aires, he made some quick changes to the Villa Meyer design and sent it to her. She chose instead to build a design by Alejandro Bustillo.
