= Charles de Gaulle (disambiguation) =

Charles de Gaulle (1890–1970) was a French military leader and statesman.

Charles de Gaulle may also refer to:

== People ==
- Charles de Gaulle (poet) (1837–1880), poet and pioneer of pan-Celticism, uncle of the statesman
- Charles de Gaulle (politician, born 1948), former member of the European Parliament, grandson of the statesman

== Other uses ==
- Charles de Gaulle Airport, the main airport serving Paris
- French aircraft carrier Charles de Gaulle (R91), an aircraft carrier in the French Navy
- Place Charles de Gaulle, a large urban junction in Paris, including the Arc de Triomphe
- Place du Général-de-Gaulle (Lille), a large plaza in Lille
- Charles de Gaulle–Étoile station, a Paris Metro and RER station under the place Charles de Gaulle
- Charles de Gaulle Square, a square in Bucharest, Romania
- Lycée Français Charles de Gaulle, a large French school in London

== See also ==
- List of things named after Charles de Gaulle
