= Michael Haddad =

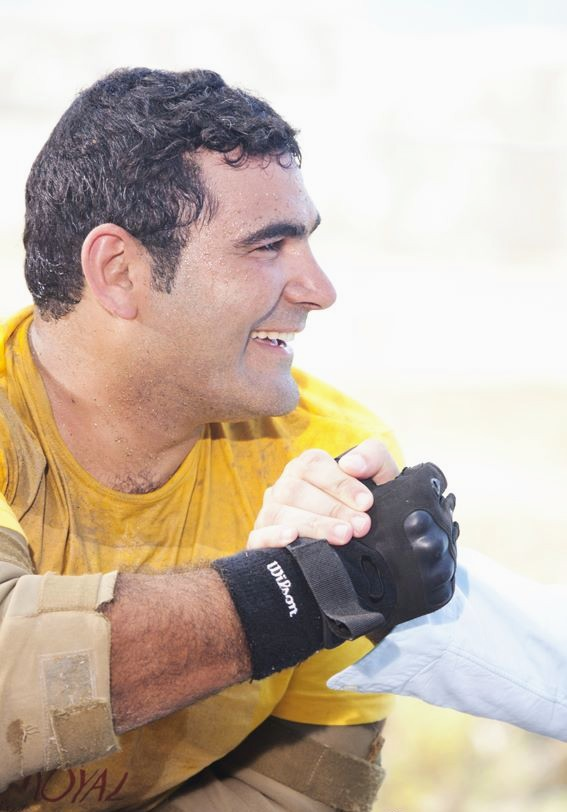
- Occupations: Athlete, social worker, climate activist
- Known for: UNDP Goodwill ambassador
- Website: http://www.michaelhaddad.org

Michael Haddad is a Lebanese professional athlete, social entrepreneur and climate activist. He is the regional goodwill ambassador of United Nations Development Programme (UNDP).

Michael suffered a jet ski accident at the age of 6, that left him paralyzed from the chest down. Although paralysed, he undergoes various missions, including short walks, marathons and climbing mountains.

== Career ==
Michael is a world record holder in walking, climbing and snowshoeing in the extreme environments of Lebanon. He crossed 19 km- 60,000 steps on mountainous trails calling for reforestation of the Lebanese Cedar. He climbed 40 m up the Raouché rock in Beirut to bring attention to marine pollution. He climbed the apex of the 'Black Peak' of the MENA Region to stress the need for action against Climate Change.

Haddad served as Climate Change Champion for UNDP in Lebanon in 2016-2017.

In September 2019, he was appointed as the goodwill ambassador for climate action by the Regional Bureau for Arab States (RBAS) in UNDP.

He is frequently invited as a keynote and motivational speaker in international programmes.
