= Avenue General de Gaulle =

Coordinates: 33.8911°N 35.4718°E

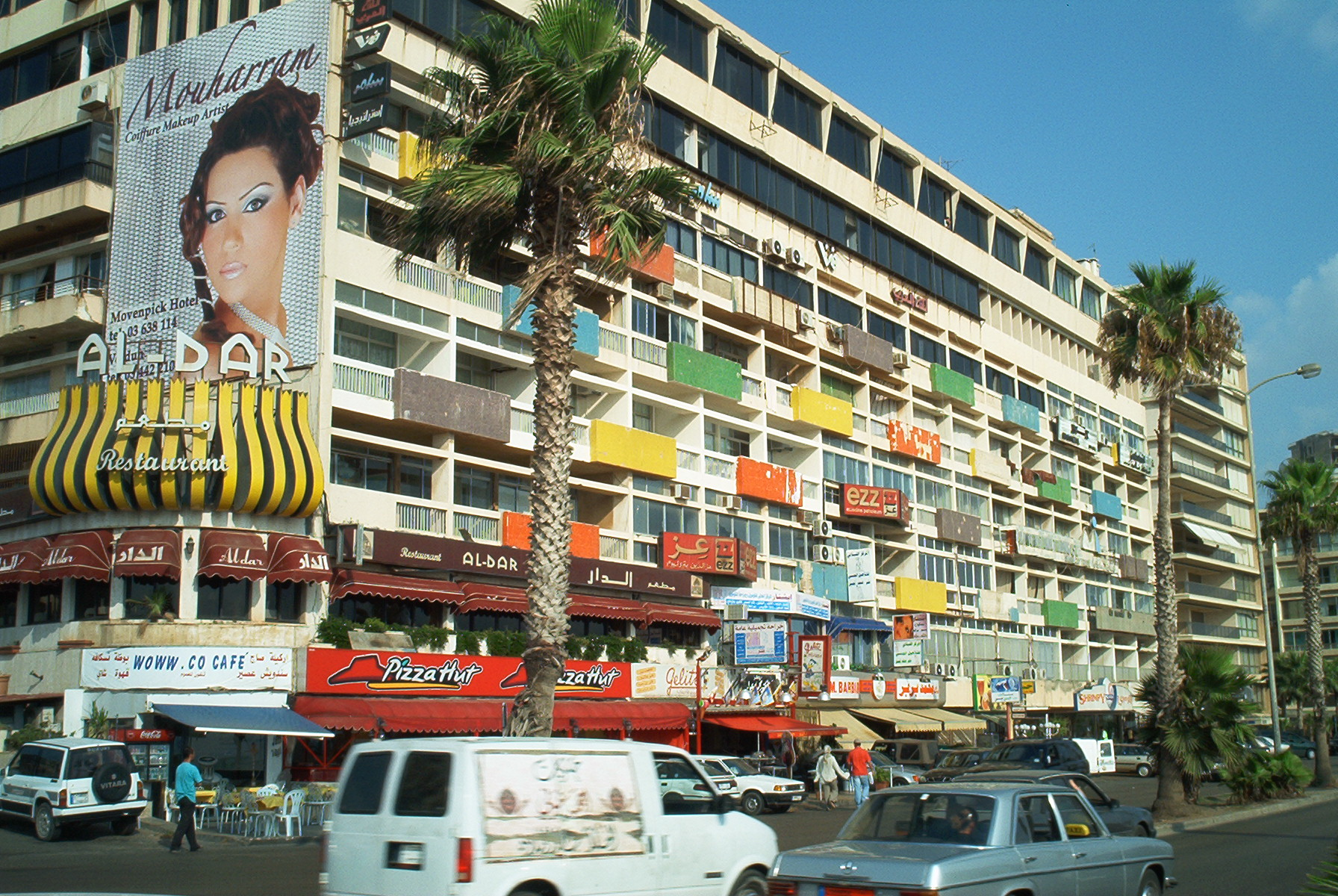
Al Dar Restaurant in 2001.

Avenue Général de Gaulle is a seaside, palm-lined street in Beirut, Lebanon. The avenue, which was named in honor of the French general and president Charles de Gaulle, forms with Avenue de Paris the Corniche Beirut promenade. The avenue runs north–south along the Mediterranean coast, from the Manara lighthouse where it connects to Avenue de Paris, skirting around the cliffs of Raouché and the Pigeons' Rocks, down to Boulevard Saeb Salam where it connects to Avenue Rafic Hariri at Ramlet al-Baida beach.

The historic Beirut Carlton, which was considered one of the most luxurious hotels in the city in pre-war Beirut, is located on the avenue. A proposal to build on Avenue Général de Gaulle a new 250-room Ritz-Carlton, designed by Chicago-based architects Perkins and Will, was revealed in 2008.

The avenue is also home to the Bain Militaire and the Mövenpick Hotel along with other hotels.

== See also ==
- Ras Beirut
- Beirut
- List of things named after Charles de Gaulle
