= Avenue des Français =

Street in Beirut, Lebanon

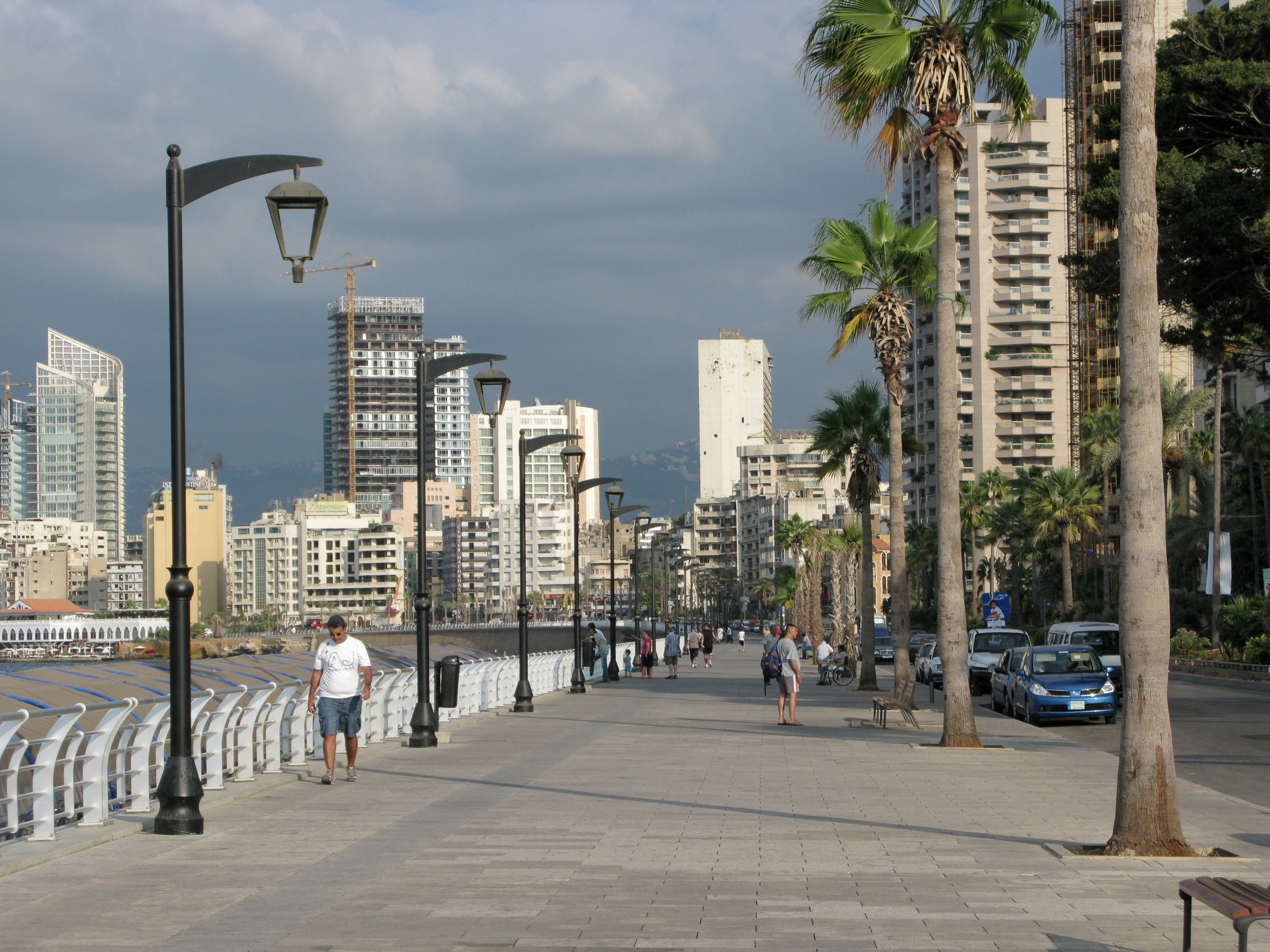
Corniche Beirut, the later extension of Avenue des Français

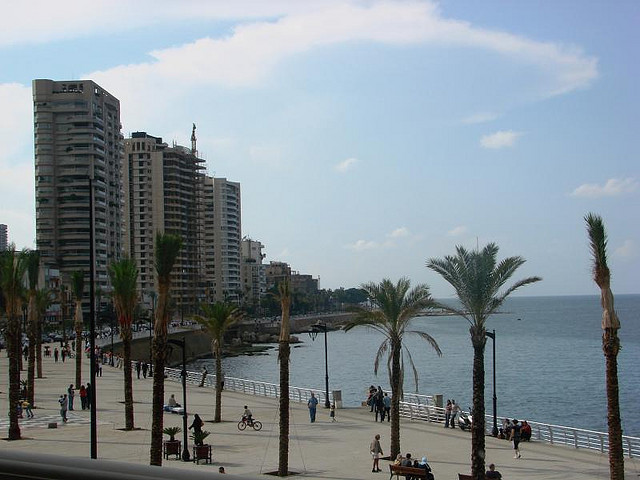
Corniche Beirut near the Saint George Bay where it originally connected to Avenue de Paris

Avenue des Français was a wide, palm-lined, seaside street in Beirut, Lebanon, and now part of the pedestrian promenade, the Shoreline Walk.

== History ==
Avenue des Français was created out of the widening of the former Rue Minet El Hosn during the period of the Mandate for Syria and the Lebanon as part of an urban renewal project planned for the capital. It was Beirut's first seaside promenade. The levee along the waterfront was enlarged with the wreckage from the old town and a retaining wall was erected from the ruins of a Byzantine basilica. Due to its broad sidewalks, palm trees, and chic hotels, the avenue quickly became the favored esplanade for the prominent families of the city. In 1925, postcards of Avenue des Français, comparing it to Promenade des Anglais in Nice, were printed to promote French tourism in the Levant. In 1932, the legendary Hotel St. Georges was built on Avenue des Français, facing Saint George Bay. It was followed by the Hotel Normandy, adding to the prestige of the thoroughfare. One of the landmarks of the avenue was Lucullus, a French restaurant that was situated between Hotel Normandy and the Hotel Bassoul. The restaurant was famous for its bouillabaisse on Fridays. The Bassoul family owned the building in which the restaurant was located. The building was sold in 1967 and later demolished to make way for the building of the Beirut Hilton. Avenue des Français was the origin of the seaside promenade, the Corniche Beirut, one of the most popular public spaces in Beirut.

== The war years ==
During the war, the avenue became buried by a landfill, called the Normandy dump after the legendary hotel that existed on the avenue prior to the war. Due to the landfill, which "[extended] the land by more than 600m to the north”, the original coastline no longer existed and with it the avenue was lost.

== Revival: a contemporary promenade ==
After the war, Solidere, the company in charge of planning and redeveloping Beirut Central District, engaged Gustafson Porter to create The Shoreline Walk, a pedestrian promenade that traced the line of the original coastline that was lost during the war. In addition to the pedestrian promenade, the Shoreline Walk included five open-space squares and gardens: Harbour Square, All Saints Square, Zeytouneh Square, Santiyeh Garden, and Shoreline Gardens, which was on the site of the historic Avenue des Francais. Gustafson Porter's chain of public squares ran through the land that was reclaimed from the Normandy dump along the line of the original shoreline, straddling the old and new sections of the city. In designing the Shoreline Gardens, Gustafson Porter incorporated a linear water feature as a contemporary interpretation of the sea wall that once existed along the avenue. By creating a sequence of spaces that traced the historic shoreline of Beirut, the Shoreline Walk once again re-established an east–west connection in this part of the city that Avenue des Français once did. After years of neglect, Avenue des Français was revived into a contemporary promenade.

== In literature ==
- Arms for Adonis by Charlotte Jay

"His elder brother, Tawfik, was settled in Beirut and conducted a prosperous business in the Avenue des Francais."

== See also ==
- Solidere
- Beirut Central District
