= Beau Rivage =

Beau Rivage means "Beautiful shore" in French. It is the name of several hotels and resorts, including:

- Beau Rivage (Beirut)
- Beau Rivage (Geneva)
- Beau Rivage (Mississippi)
- Beau-Rivage Palace in Lausanne
- Beau Rivage Island (Parks Canada) in Thousand Islands, Ontario, Canada
- Beau Rivage, the name of the second turn at the Circuit de Monaco, home of the Monaco Grand Prix
