= Corniche Beirut =

Seaside promenade in Beirut, Lebanon

Coordinates: 33°54′0″N 35°28′15″E

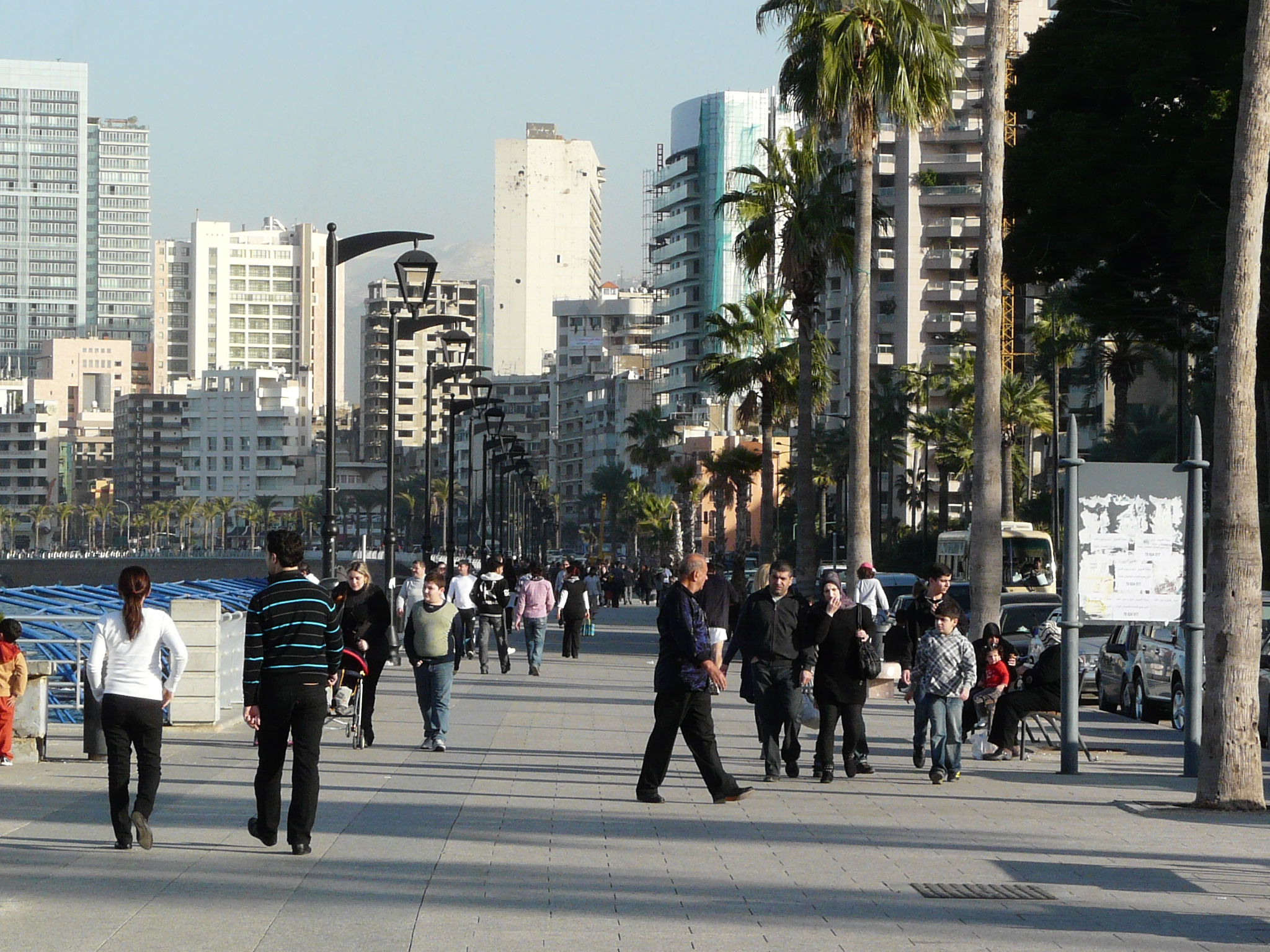
The Corniche Beirut

The Corniche Beirut is a seaside promenade in the Central District of Beirut, Lebanon. Lined with palm trees, the waterfront esplanade has views of the Mediterranean Sea and the summits of Mount Lebanon to the east. Corniche Beirut has its foundation in the Avenue des Français, which was built during the period of the Mandate for Syria and the Lebanon along the seafront that extended from the old town.

== Location ==
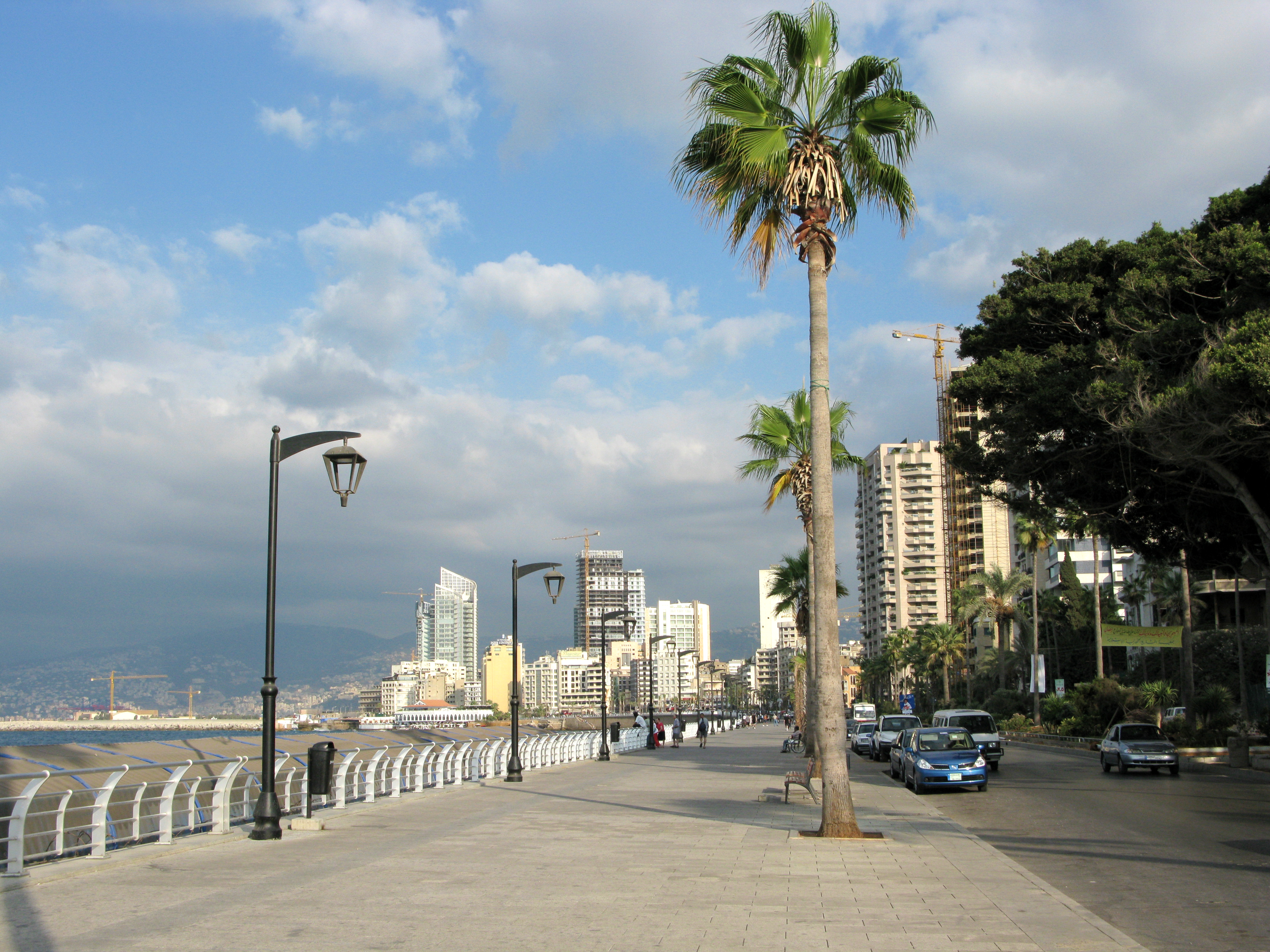
Palm trees at the seafront

The Corniche, which is 4.8-kilometre (3.0 mi) long, encircles the Beirut promontory from the Saint George Bay on the northern coast of the city, turning west into Place Rafic Hariri, then into Avenue de Paris and the Raouché, and then into Avenue General de Gaulle before it ends on Rafic Hariri Avenue.

== Usage ==
The Corniche is a common destination for walkers, joggers and bikers. Push cart vendors offer various local snacks and drinks. A number of the trunks of the palm trees that line the Corniche are pockmarked with bullet holes from the Lebanese Civil War. Several hotels, such as Le Vendôme Intercontinental Hotel and Phoenicia InterContinental Hotel overlook the Corniche.

== Modernization ==
In 2001, the 76 cement benches were replaced with new ones covered with colorful cut ceramics that were designed by Lebanese artist Lena Kelekian, who also designed a Mega Chessboard on the widest section of the sidewalk on Avenue de Paris. In the summer of 2007, the distinctive blue railings were replaced, due to severe rusting, with an aluminum railing that has been modified to make it more difficult for thrill-seekers to dive off the railings.

== Gallery ==
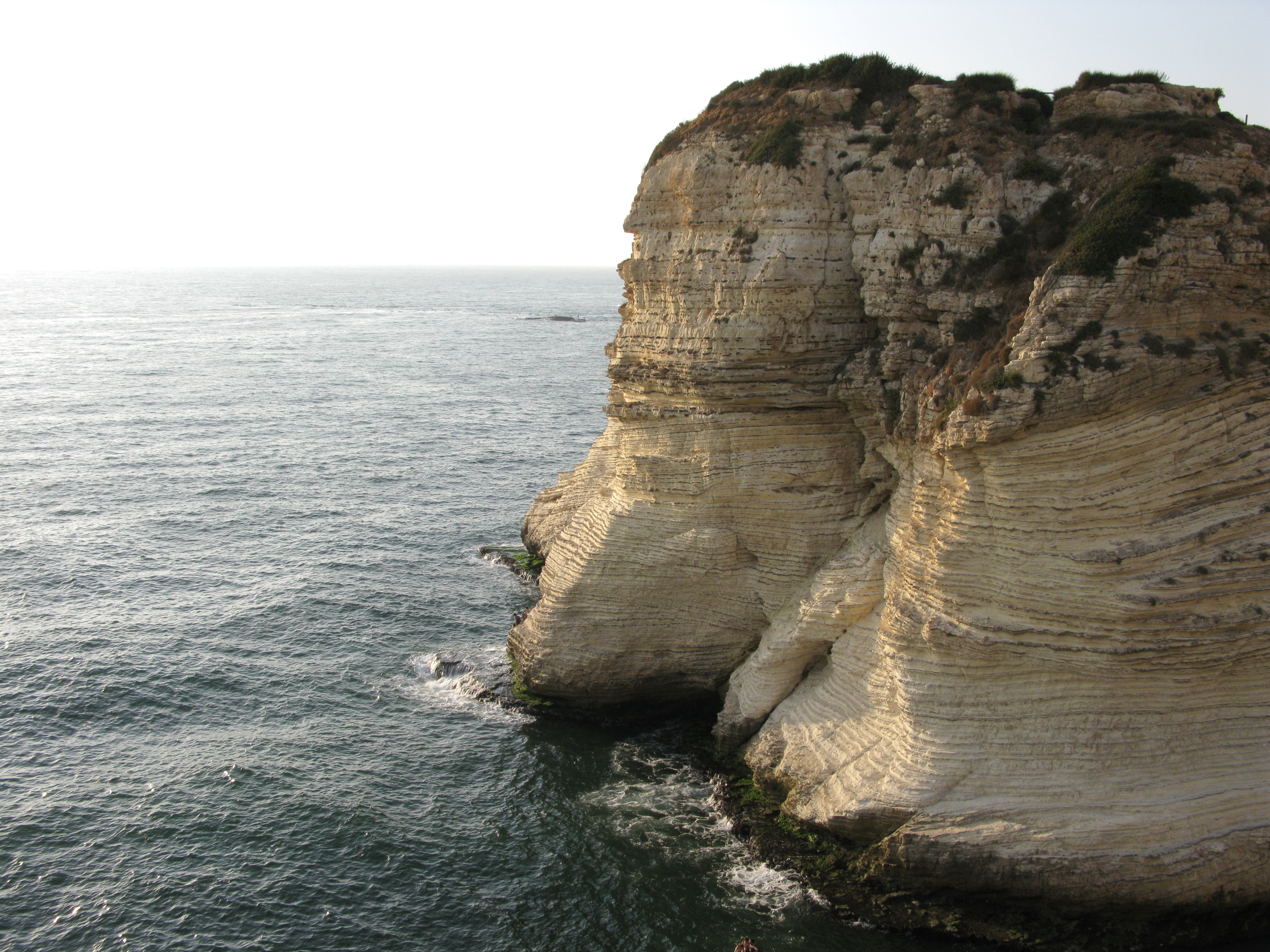

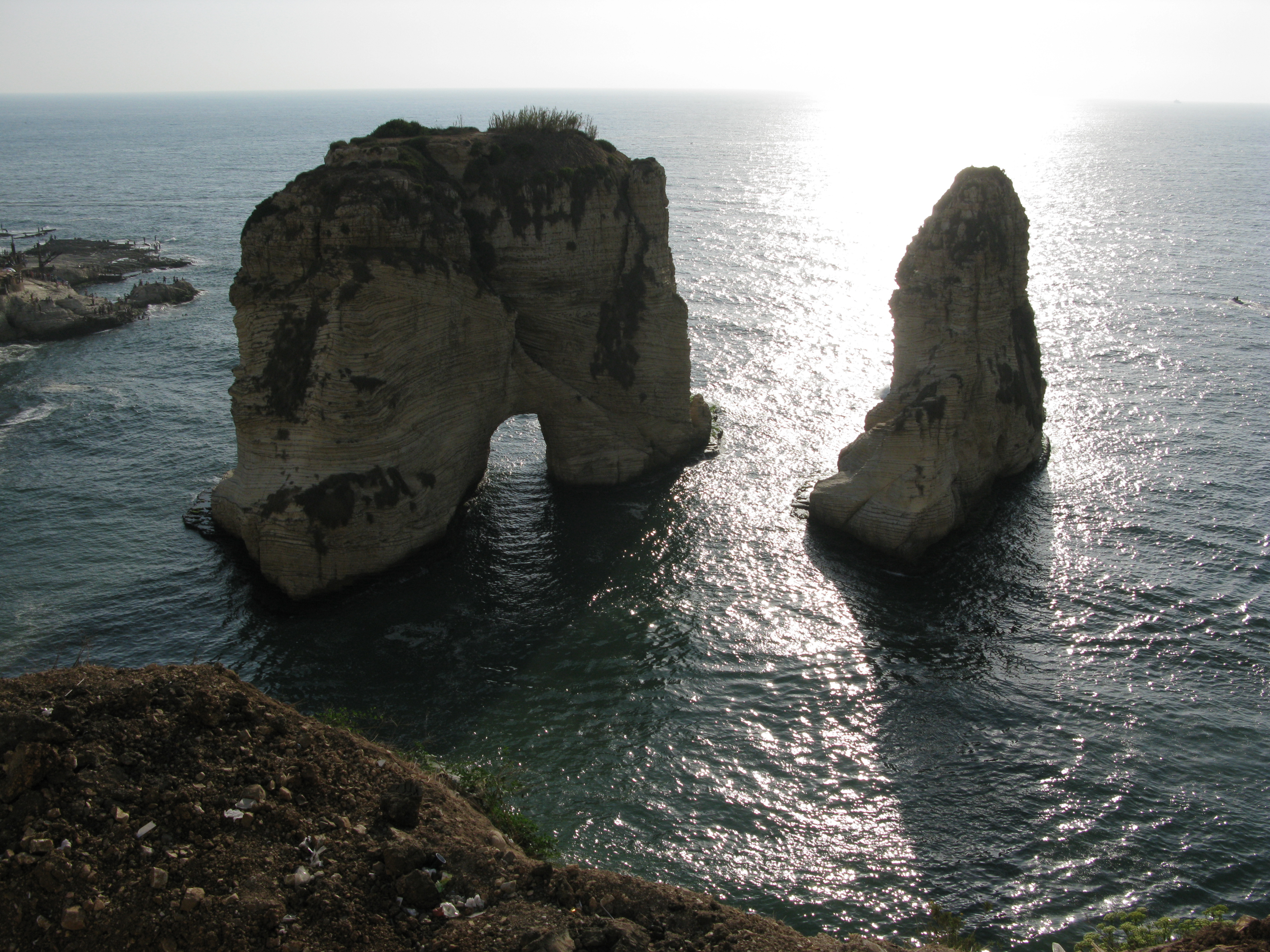

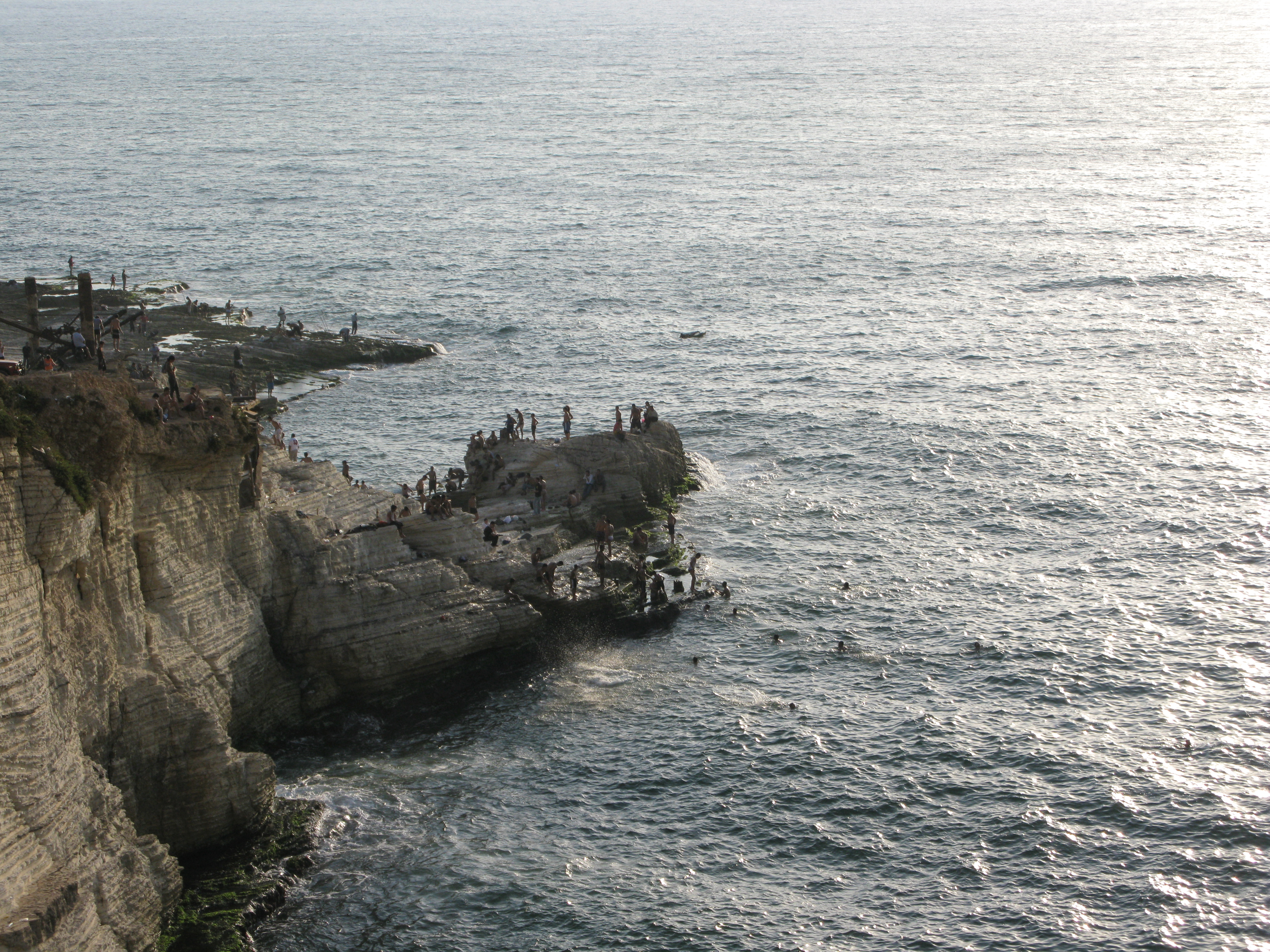

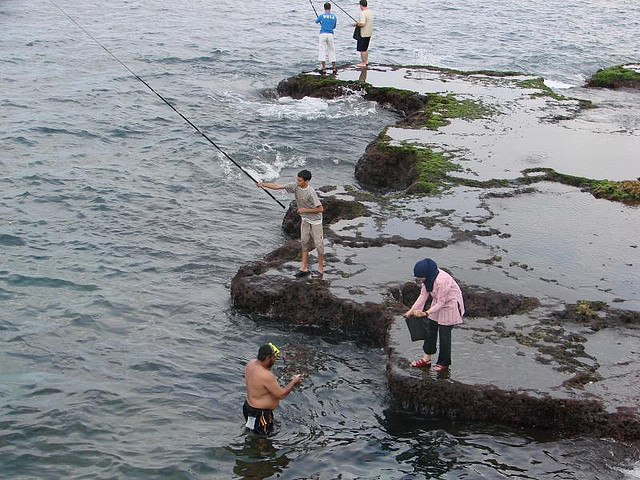

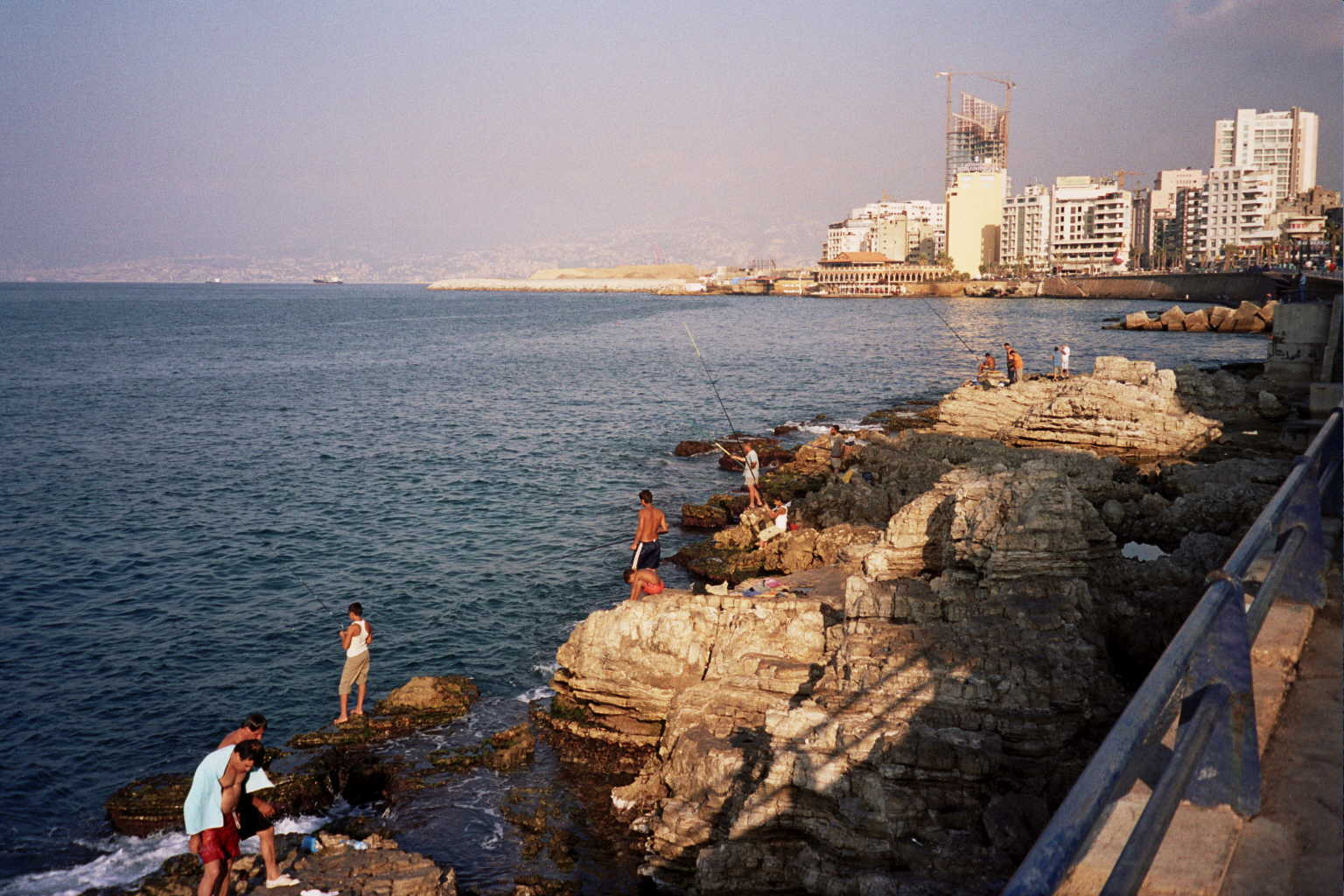

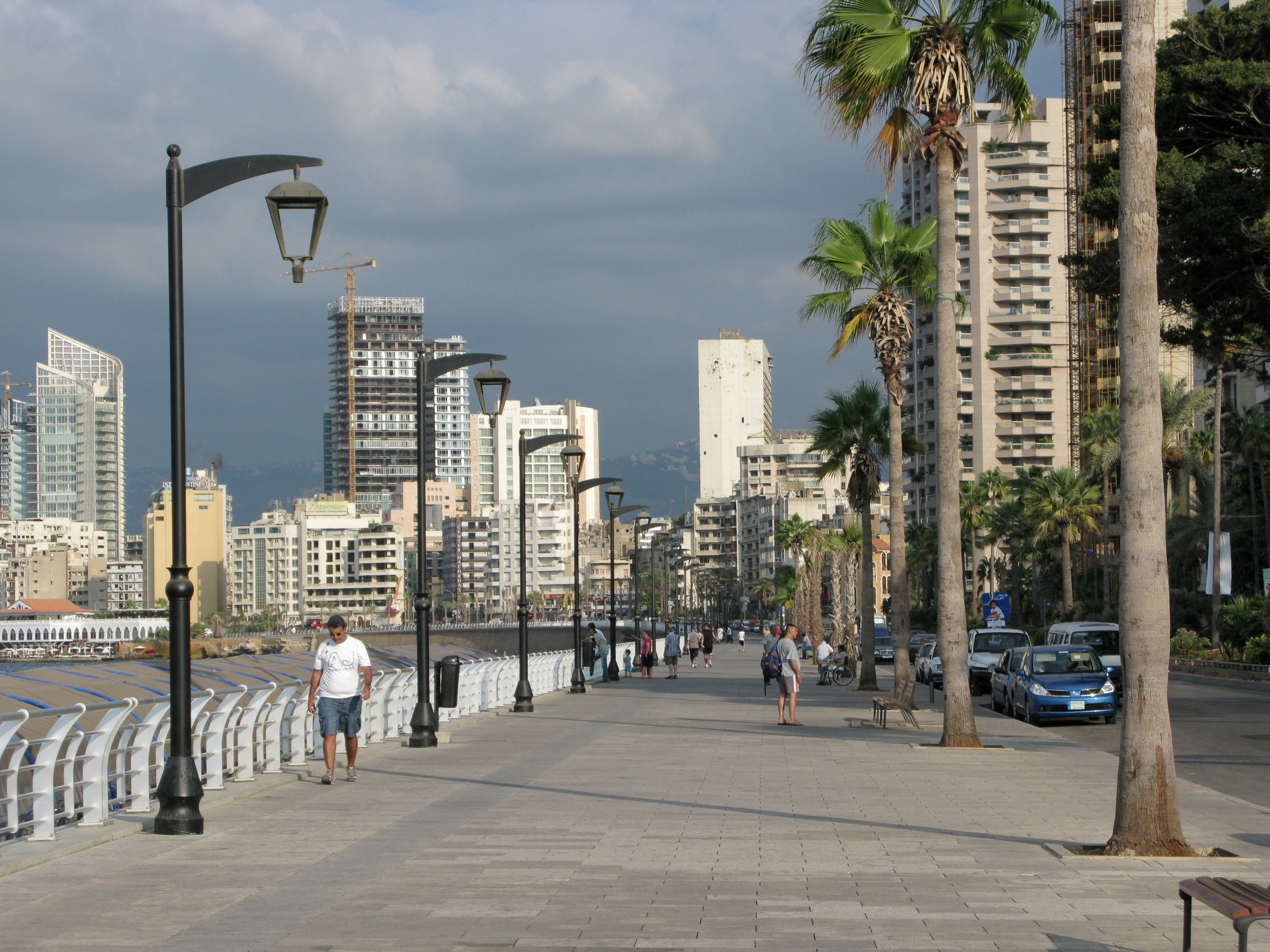

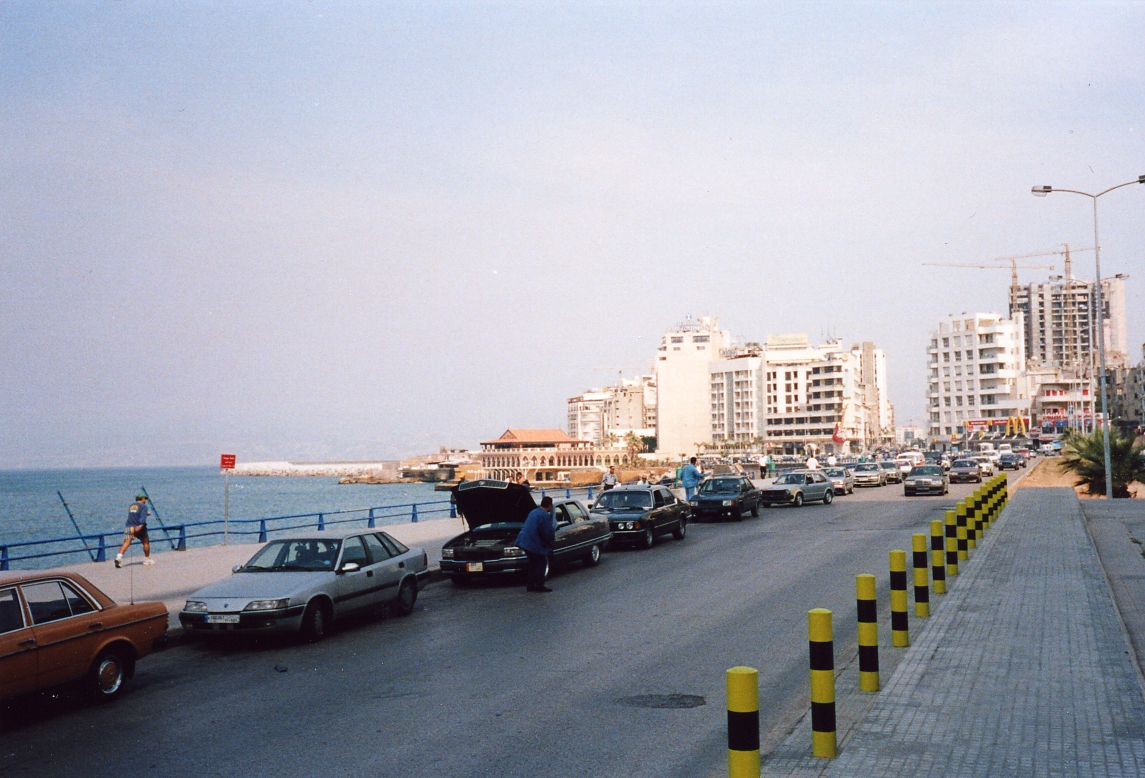

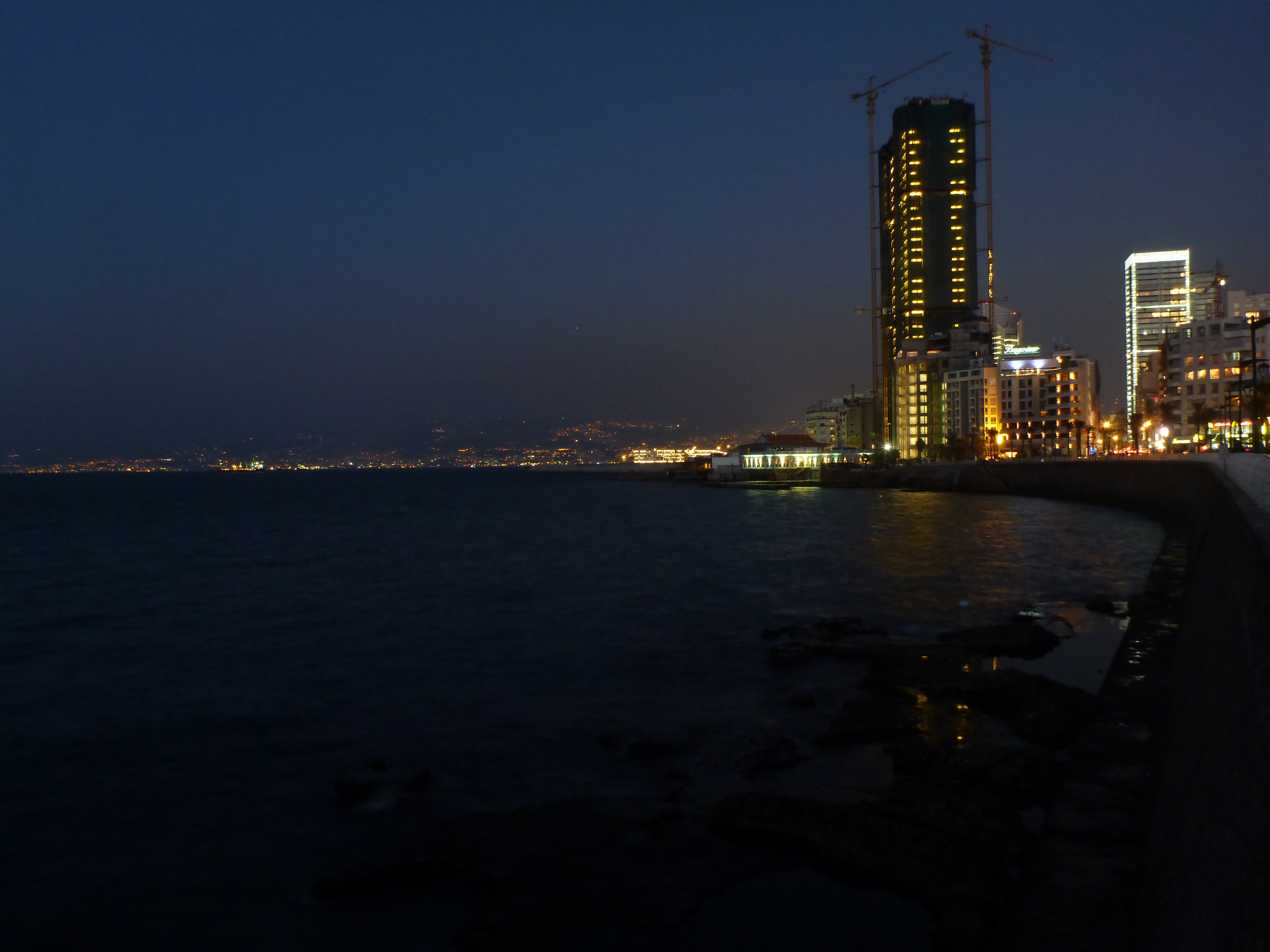
View to Saint George Bay
