= Ramlet al-Baida =

Public beach in Beirut, Lebanon

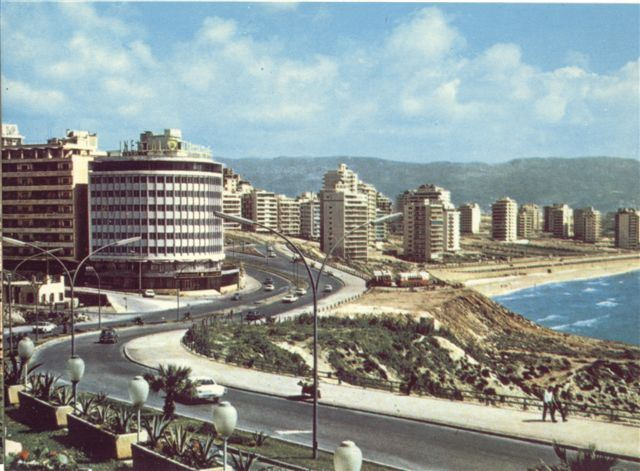
Ramlet al-Baida, 1970

Ramlet al-Baida (Arabic: الرملة البيضا) is a public beach in Beirut, Lebanon. The beach is situated along the southern end of the Corniche Beirut promenade where Avenue General de Gaulle meets Avenue Rafic Hariri and ends at Rue Venezuela. Despite the beach's location in Moussaitbeh, close to the upscale district of Ras Beirut, the beach is popular with a predominantly male clientele from Beirut's low-income southern suburbs. The beach is also a popular cruising area.

== History ==
The beach was the location of major events during the war in Lebanon. On April 10, 1973, a seaborne Israeli commando unit that landed in Dora, departed from Ramlet al- Bayda after assassinating PLO officials, Muhammad Al Najjar, Kamal Adwan, and Kamal Nasser. The corpse of Francis Meloy, the incoming U.S. Ambassador to Lebanon, was discovered on this beach on 16 June 1976. In 1983, a terrorist group, believed to be Iranian-backed, bombed the barracks of the French peacekeepers that were stationed four miles from the beach area. The attack killed 58 French soldiers.

=== Beau Rivage ===
Hotel Beau Rivage, which overlooked the beach, was the headquarters of the Syrian intelligence in Beirut from 1997 to 2005. The hotel became the center for detaining Lebanese dissidents and synonymous with torture and human rights violations. After the Syrians withdrew from Lebanon in 2005, the hotel was renovated and in 2008, it was reopened as a civilian luxury hotel.
