= Statue of Winston Churchill, Paris =

Statue by Jean Cardot in Paris, France

Coordinates: 48°51′55″N 2°18′50″E

A statue of Winston Churchill by Jean Cardot was inaugurated in the grounds of the Petit Palais on the Avenue Winston Churchill in the 8th arrondissement of Paris in 1998. The statue of the former British prime minister is one of few statues of foreigners in the French capital.

== Description ==
The statue of Winston Churchill was commissioned at the start of 1998, five years after a statue of Charles de Gaulle was unveiled in London. The two leaders had a complex relationship, both on personal terms and in France–United Kingdom relations.

Paris-based British businessman Brian Reeve came up with the idea. The 3.2 metre, 2,500 kg bronze statue was funded by 3,000 donations totalling the equivalent of £250,000. The largest donation was equal to £20,000, and the Council of Paris also contributed. It is based on a photograph of Churchill marching with De Gaulle down the Champs-Élysées on 11 November 1944. Cardot said that the image of Churchill walking reflected his determination. The plinth features the words "We shall never surrender" from the prime minister's 6 June 1940 speech.

On 11 November 1998, the 80th anniversary of the armistice that ended World War I, the statue was unveiled in the presence of Queen Elizabeth II and the President of France, Jacques Chirac. The British monarch gave a speech in French on how Churchill and De Gaulle had overcome their differences.

== Incidents ==
The BBC reported in 1998 that Churchill is opposed by a minority in France for events such as the Allied bombing of German-occupied French locations. In August 2009, the statue was vandalised in red paint with the initials of Rudolf Hess, the Nazi who Churchill had arrested when he travelled to the UK for peace talks.

In July 2015, a French court ordered Nike, Inc. and an events company to pay a total of €135,000 damages to Cardot, who had sued them for unauthorised promotional use of his statue. The sportswear corporation had dressed Churchill in a Tony Parker basketball jersey in 2011.
