= List of names and terms of address used for Charles de Gaulle =

Throughout the life of Charles de Gaulle, French Resistance leader and later President (1890–1970), his popularity and influence generated a series of different names and terms of address used to refer to him. Because of his political character, these terms and names tend to reflect the feelings of the speaker towards De Gaulle, whether they be of sympathy, respect, or scorn. For instance, the use of le Général almost always indicates that the speaker is a nostalgic Gaullist supporter.

== Names in current use ==
- Charles André Joseph Marie de Gaulle: This is the legal name of de Gaulle, used for official purposes when he was alive, in his birth, marriage, and death certificates, passports and other identity documents. However it is not used in French encyclopedias or dictionaries.
- Charles de Gaulle: This is the regular name that de Gaulle used in everyday life, the name that is used in French encyclopedias and dictionaries, official documents, when French people show a list of all their former presidents, etc.
- Le Général de Gaulle: This name originates from the promotion of de Gaulle to provisional brigadier general by Prime Minister Paul Reynaud in May 1940. After his rebellion in June 1940, de Gaulle never returned into the army, thus never advancing to higher ranks of general. As a brigadier general, he was considered a one-star general (Note: while French brigadier generals technically wear two stars, the French rank has a NATO code of OF-6, and is equivalent to a 'one-star' officer in the standard military star ranking). Charles de Gaulle demonstrated attachment to his military past. During his political career, he often appeared in uniform, especially during critical moments such as the Putsch of Algiers in 1961. Many French people considered it humorous to see a one-star general commanding authority over five-star generals. Indeed, during the Second World War, one-star general de Gaulle had been scorned by five-star generals who remained faithful to Vichy France. This may explain why de Gaulle remained attached to his one-star status, which reminded him of the days of the Free French during the war.
  In France, le général de Gaulle is now the most widely used term to refer to de Gaulle. Most avenues or streets which are called after de Gaulle use this term (e.g. avenue du général de Gaulle), but there are some exceptions, such as Charles de Gaulle Airport (aéroport de Roissy-Charles de Gaulle). People who have issue with the military or de Gaulle's role in the military generally prefer Charles de Gaulle over général de Gaulle. Charles de Gaulle is supposedly more neutral, but général de Gaulle is now so widely accepted that using Charles de Gaulle in conversation definitely carries a feeling of distance, or covert criticism. One could guess the feeling of someone toward Gaullism simply by watching whether they use général de Gaulle or Charles de Gaulle.
- le Président de Gaulle was mainly used in formal circumstances when he was president.
- le Général ("the general"): This is used by people most devoted to de Gaulle, especially people who personally knew him, or worked under him. This was the term used by the ministers of de Gaulle when they referred to him in private. They would never have said le président as there is a feeling of partisanship (and now, nostalgia) attached to the word, and consequently it is not used by his critics. In France, when the phrase le Général is used alone, it is almost always understood as meaning de Gaulle. This phrase is nowadays hardly ever used except by elderly Gaullist supporters.
- L'homme du 18 Juin ("the man of June 18th"): In reference to the appeal of June 18, which is considered to be the beginning of the Free French and the French Resistance as well as the very first major public appearance of General de Gaulle. The expression is often used in historical or Gaullist contexts.
- mon général: This was used by ministers of de Gaulle and by his close supporters when addressing him, but also by journalists in the regular press interviews he gave starting in 1944. His critics most commonly used Monsieur le président instead.
- mongénéral: This was, and still is, used by satirical publications such as the Canard Enchaîné to caricature the devotion and, according to those publications, blind obedience and ideologic conformity that de Gaulle's followers had.
- de Gaulle: This is used nowadays to refer to de Gaulle as a historical character, often with a tone of praise or respect, such as recent book C'était de Gaulle ("Thus was de Gaulle"). In colloquial conversation, a Frenchman could say: "De Gaulle, c'était quelqu'un ! " ("De Gaulle, now that was a man!"). In French, calling someone by their family name alone is considered derogatory when they are alive, but it is considered normal for historical figures when they are dead.
- Monsieur Charles de Gaulle or Monsieur de Gaulle: This is how de Gaulle was referred to as a student. His professors would have addressed him as Monsieur de Gaulle in formal circumstances, and as de Gaulle alone in informal circumstances. After high school, de Gaulle entered the military, and so he was addressed by his military rank at the time, followed by de Gaulle (lieutenant de Gaulle, etc.)

== Historical names ==
- le colonel Motors: This is how de Gaulle was called by jokers in the French military in the 1930s. Charles de Gaulle's proposals that the French army should emphasize the use of tanks and armored vehicles were scorned by the high command. Consequently, de Gaulle was denied promotions to the rank of general, and remained a colonel until the fall of France in June 1940, when his theories eventually proved correct. This nickname of colonel Motors is a play on the General Motors Corporation name that translates as "The Americans have the general Motors, we French must settle for the colonel Motors." In addition, the use of the English word "motor" was made on purpose to caricature de Gaulle as a reckless partisan of tanks because in French, English words had, and still have, a feeling of modernity, sometimes to the point of being too recklessly new.
- Gaulle: This is how the military leaders of Vichy France called de Gaulle. They were scornful of a two-star general who pretended to be the incarnation of France in London. They took away the apparently aristocratic particle "de" (see French names) to belittle de Gaulle. Gaulle is also homophonic with the French word "gaule", the long pole that is used to harvest walnuts. This French word can also be understood in slang as meaning "dumb".
- le grand Charles: This was used in political caricatures, referring to the tall height of de Gaulle (196 cm, 6'5"). Although used by caricaturists, there is often a friendly feeling to it, and it was used as the title for a 2006 TV-drama of his life. Nowadays, this phrase can still be heard sometimes, when people in casual conversation refer to de Gaulle, but with a little scornful tone in the voice (often it is pronounced with the voice trailing on "Charles").
- mon grand: This was used in some satirical cartoons. A famous one shows the Eiffel Tower welcoming de Gaulle during the Liberation of Paris, bending to embrace him, and calling him mon grand. Other cartoons in the 1960s show Marianne, the personification of France, casually conversing with de Gaulle, and calling him mon grand. In French, mon grand is the way a mother tenderly calls her son.
- la grande Zohra: This is a derogatory expression that was used by the Europeans living in French Algeria and the people in favor of French Algeria. After de Gaulle opted for the independence of Algeria, he became the subject of much hatred among those who favored a French Algeria. "Zohra" is reportedly the way North African Arabs colloquially call a camel. Often this expression is associated a drawing of de Gaulle dressed as an Arab woman, complete with earrings and veil, with only his big nose protruding from the veil. Perhaps there was the idea that de Gaulle was "prostituting" himself to the pro-independence Algerian rebellion. The use of the feminine, instead of the masculine, also has a diminutive effect in French. Today, the expression is still heard sometimes among the pied-noir community.
- Viper: This is a reference to the captain Mike "Viper" Metcalf in Top Gun, used by French antimilitarists in the late 80's. The use of this reference may be seen as a paradox, as Charles de Gaulle was not really pro-American. At any rate, the peremptory behaviour of the captain in the movie suits very well to the general, according to his detractors.
- Charlot: This is a reference to Charlie Chaplin character, used by opponents.
- Big Moustache: This is a reference to the character of the British squadron leader in the French movie La Grande Vadrouille, and is used by young Frenchmen. This evokes the glorious British past of the general, and his moustache.
- le Connétable or le Connétable de France: He acquired this name when he was a prisoner of war in Germany during the Great War. It had come about because of the talks which he gave to fellow prisoners on the progress of the conflict. These were delivered with such patriotic ardor and confidence in victory that they called him by the title which had been given to the commander-in-chief of the French army during the monarchy.
- la grande asperge: This translates to "the tall asparagus." Le Connétable spent four years studying and training at the elite military academy, Saint-Cyr. While there, because of his height, tall forehead, and nose, he acquired the nickname "the tall asparagus". It is common in French to use "asparagus" as a slur against tall people.
- le melon-kilomètre: Another nickname from Saint-Cyr, coming from one initiation where one had to measure the courtyard using one's own body as a yardstick, and given his height, he managed to do it faster than others.
- Cyrano: This nickname derives from his large nose and refers to Cyrano de Bergerac.

== See also ==
- List of things named after Charles de Gaulle
