= Beau Rivage (Beirut) =

Hotel in Beirut, Lebanon

General information
- Status: Operating
- Location: Beirut, Lebanon
- Opening: 1876

Technical details
- Floor count: 12
- Floor area: 420 m^{2} (4,500 sq ft)

Other information
- Number of suites: 317
- Number of restaurants: 3
- Parking: 247

Website
- http://beaurivage-beirut.com/

The Beau Rivage is a four-star luxury hotel on the Ramlet al-Baida beach in Beirut, Lebanon.

From 1997 until the 2005 Syrian withdrawal from Lebanon, the hotel served as the headquarters for Syrian intelligence in Lebanon. Prisoners held there were often tortured; some were "disappeared" and presumably executed. The building was a feared symbol of Syrian power in Lebanon.

As of August, 2008, the building again functions as a civilian luxury hotel, and is open for business.

== In Film ==
Beau Rivage by Claude El Khal is a 2003 short film about the atrocities committed in the hotel during the Syrian occupation.
