= Jean Cardot =

French sculptor (1930–2020)

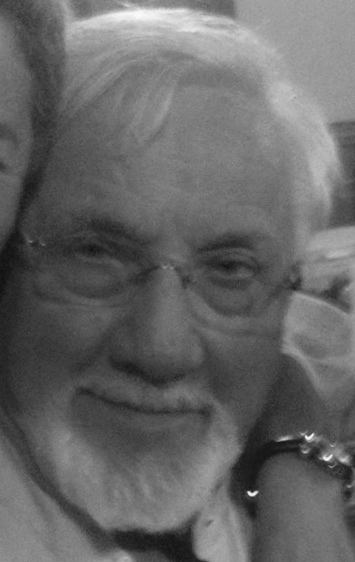
- Born: 20 July 1930; Saint-Étienne, France
- Died: 13 October 2020 (aged 90); Paris, 14th arrondissement
- Occupation: sculptor
- Known for: member, president, Académie des Beaux-Arts
- Notable work: statues of Winston Churchill, Charles de Gaulle, Thomas Jefferson in Paris

Jean Cardot (French: [ʒɑ̃ kaʁdo]; 20 July 1930 – 13 October 2020) was a French sculptor, born in Saint-Étienne, France. He is known for his monumental sculptures that depict political figures and that are designed to complement particular architectural settings (e.g. museums, promenades, public squares).

== Career ==
From 1941 to 1956, Jean Cardot attended, first, the School of Fine Arts (École de Beaux-Arts) in Saint-Étienne, then that of Lyon, and finally the National School of Fine Arts in Paris (École de Beaux-Arts de Paris) in the workshops of Marcel Gaumont and Alfred Janniot. After obtaining a second Grand Prix de Rome in 1956, he stayed at the Casa de Velázquez in Madrid from 1957 to 1959.

In 1961, Cardot was awarded the Prix Antoine Bourdelle for sculpture and accepted the post of professor at the School of Fine Arts in Lyon. He resigned from this post in 1964 in order to pursue a career as a full time sculptor. It is during this period that he received his first public commissions. In 1974, he was named head of the workshop on ‘taille directe’ (direct chiseling onto a raw material) at the School of Fine Arts of Paris (Beaux-Arts de Paris). In 1989, Cardot received the Prix Paul Baudry of the Taylor Foundation. He was elected a member of the Académie des Beaux-Arts on 9 November 1983 and president in 1992 and 1997.

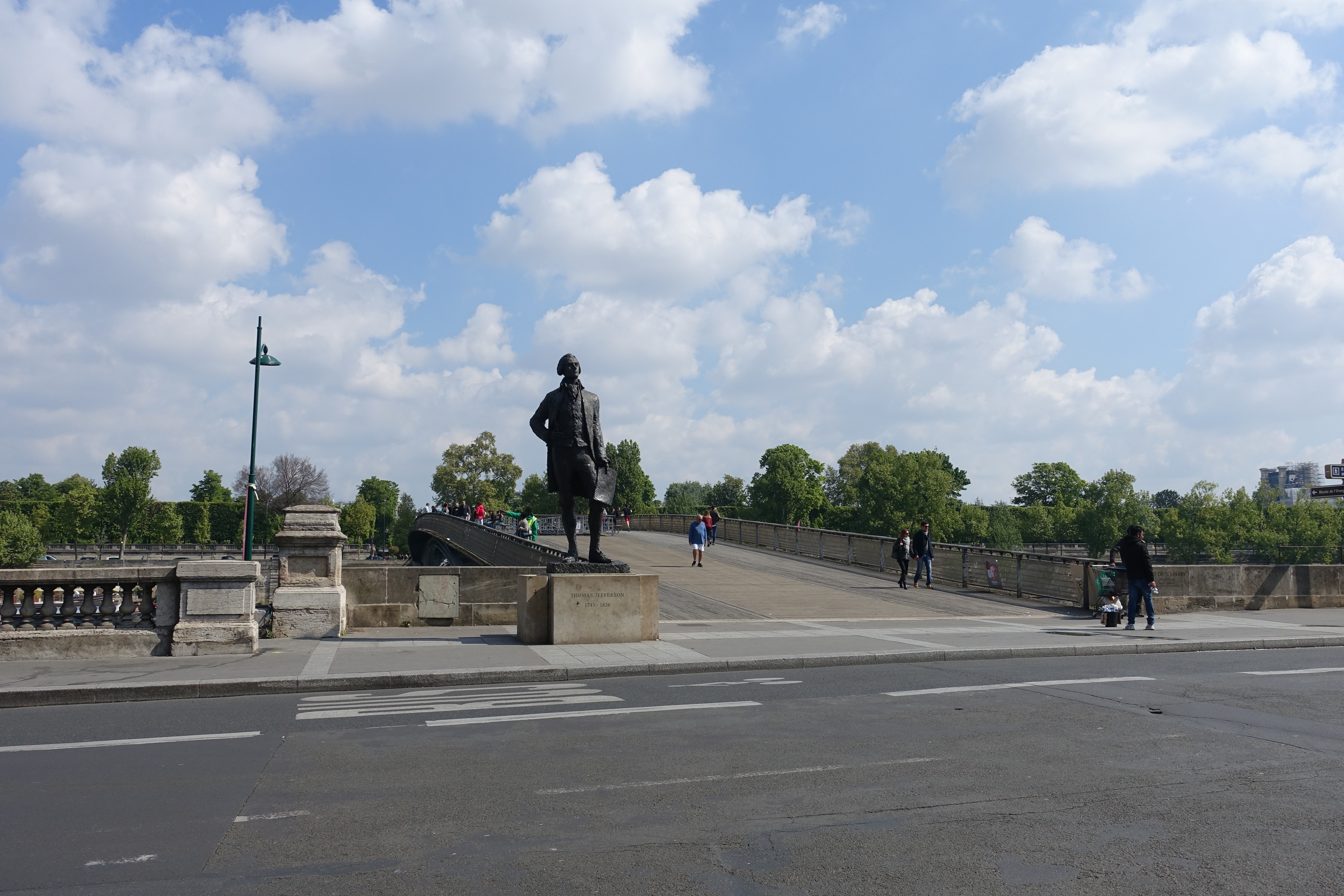
Statue of Thomas Jefferson in Paris

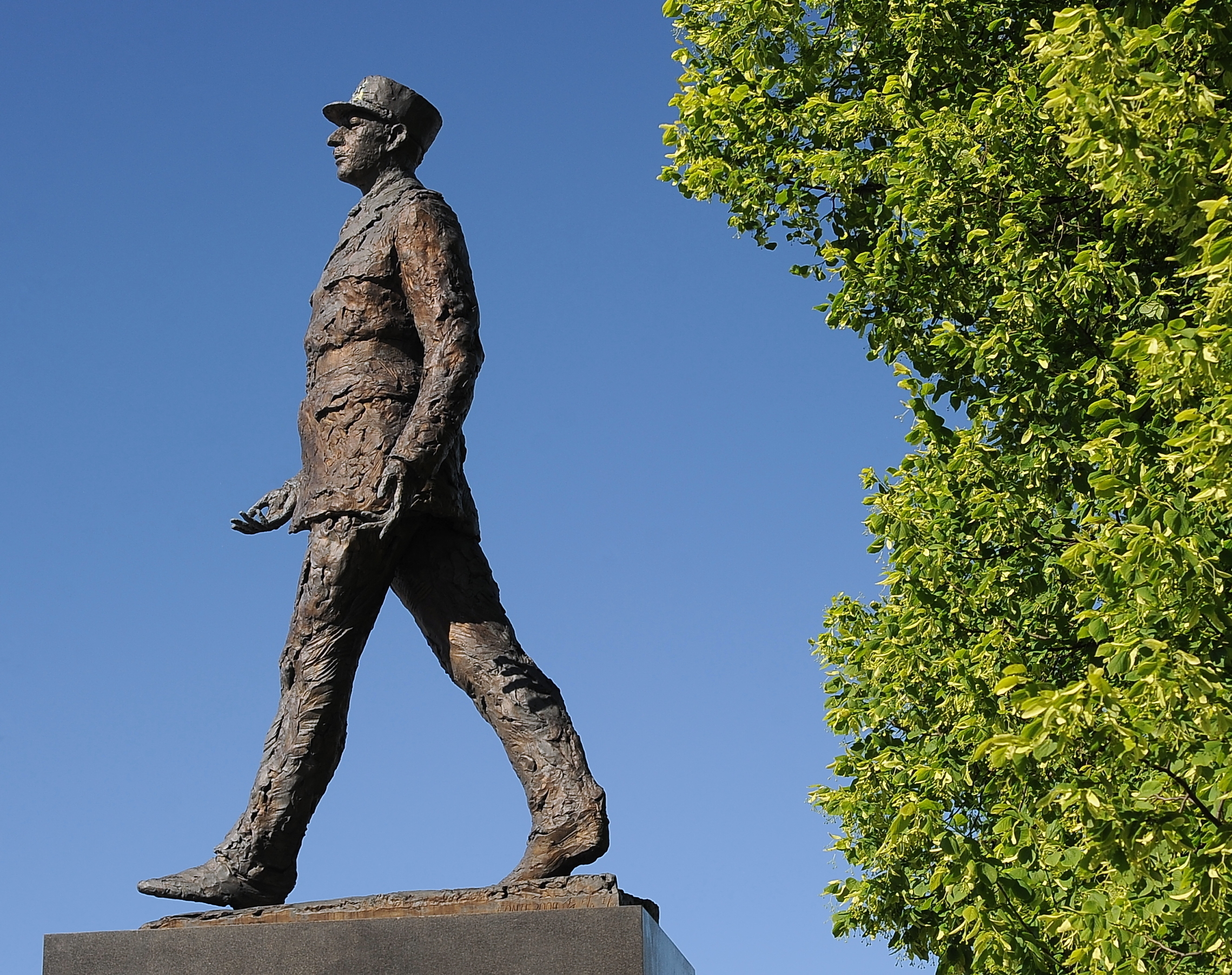
Statue of Charles de Gaulle in Warsaw

Jean Cardot is known for his monumental works that are closely tied to their architectural setting. In 1962, he produced the Madonna of Bouthéon, on the occasion of the centenary of the church Saint Laurent in Andrézieux-Bouthéon, France. In 1967, he sculpted the Dying Bull (Taureau mourant), a statue that he originally executed in clay and later recast in bronze, for a high school in Saint-Étienne. In 1969, his granite fountain sculpture was placed in the university hospital center of Saint-Étienne. In 1973-1975, his Monument to the Resistance and the Deportation of the Val-de Marne, in cast aluminum, chosen by competition, was erected in Créteil. In 1979, he also produced a sculpture representing a flock of sheep, exhibited in front of the Cattenom nuclear power plant in Moselle.

Large public commissions occupied an essential place in Cardot's work, much of which focused on monumental effigies of major political figures. He is best known for his statues in Paris of Sir Winston Churchill, 1998, on the Right Bank of the Seine in front of the Petit Palais and on Avenue Winston Churchill; of General Charles de Gaulle 2000 on the Champs-Elysées in front of the Grand Palais; and of Thomas Jefferson 2006 on the Left Bank of the Seine, facing the Musée d'Orsay and the Musée de la Légion d'Honneur, by the Passerelle Léopold-Sédar-Senghor, formerly Pont de Solférino.
