= Statue of Charles de Gaulle (Warsaw) =

Monument in Warsaw, Poland

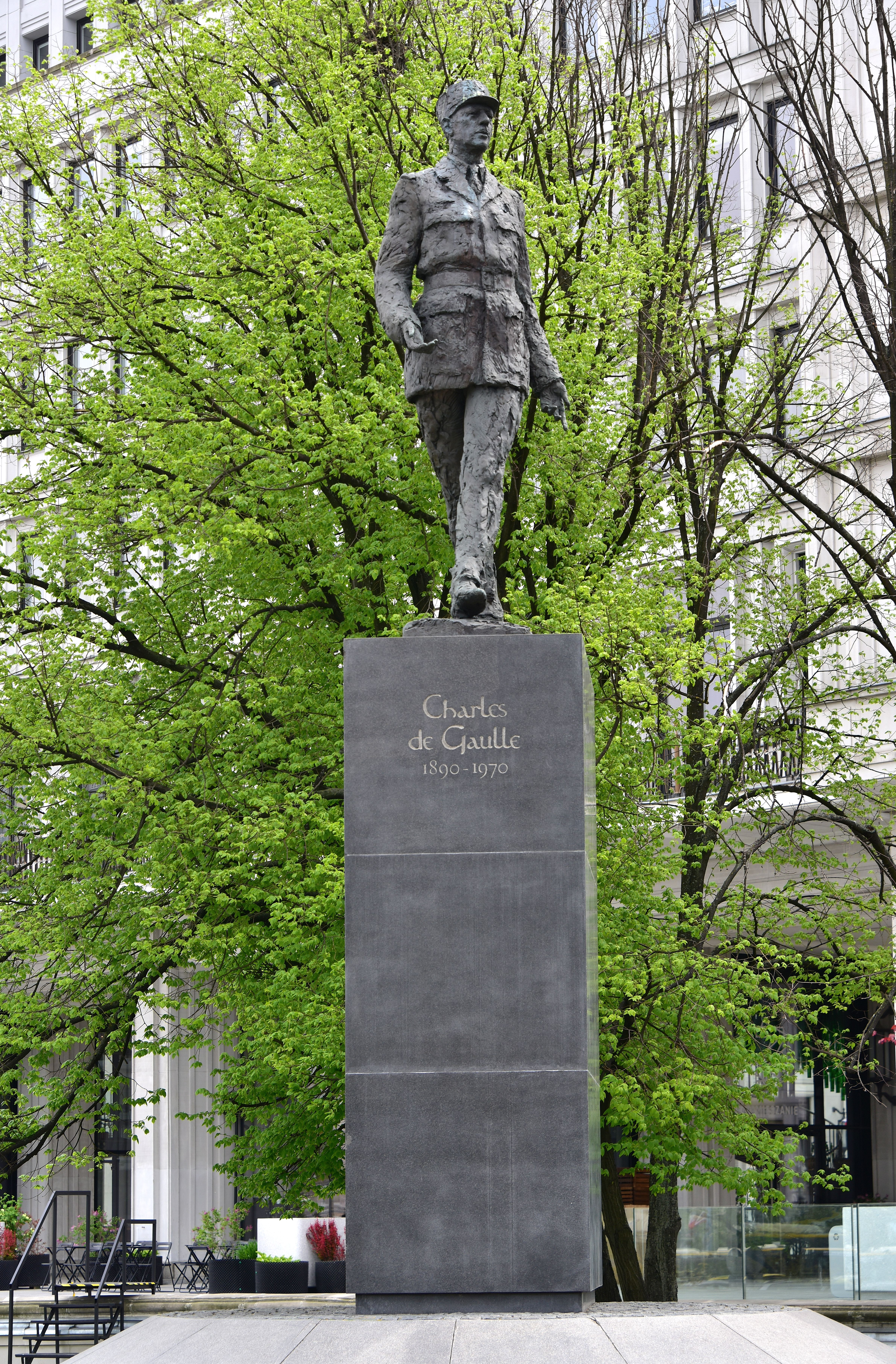
- The monument in 2019
- Interactive map of Statue of Charles de Gaulle
- Location: Charles de Gaulle Roundabout, Downtown, Warsaw, Masovian Voivodeship, Poland
- Coordinates: 52°13′53.52″N 21°01′17.31″E
- Designer: Jean Cardot
- Type: Statue
- Material: Bronze
- Height: 4 m (13.12 ft)
- Opening date: 15 May 2005
- Dedicated to: Charles de Gaulle

The statue of Charles de Gaulle (Note: English: /də ˈɡoʊl, də ˈɡɔːl/ də GOHL, də GAWL, French: [ʃaʁl(ə) də ɡol]) (Polish: Pomnik Charles’a de Gaulle’a; French: Statue de Charles de Gaulle) is a monument in the city of Warsaw in Masovian Voivodeship, Poland, located within the neighbourhood of South Downtown. It is placed at Charles de Gaulle Roundabout, near the Banking and Financial Centre, located at 6 and 12 New World Street. It is dedicated to Charles de Gaulle (1890–1970), a military officer and statesman who led the Free French Forces against Germany in the Second World War and served as the president of France from 1959 to 1969. The monument has a form of a bronze statue placed on a pedestal. The statue was designed by sculptor Jean Cardot, while its pedestal and surrounding area were designed by architects Andrzej Kiciński, Marcin Bednarczyk, and Robert Jaworski. It is a replica of the statue of Charles de Gaulle by Jean Cardot from 2000, displayed in Paris, France at the Clemenceau Square. The monument was unveiled on 15 May 2005.

== History ==
The monument was dedicated to Charles de Gaulle (1890–1970), a military officer and statesman who led the Free French Forces against Germany in the Second World War and served as the president of France from 1959 to 1969. The statue, was a replica of a sculpture by Jean Cardot, which was unveiled at the Clemenceau Square in Paris, France in 2000. The bronze cast of the sculpture was manufactured in Bielsko-Biała, Poland by Marek Żebrowski. The pedestal and the surrounding area were designed by architects Andrzej Kiciński, Marcin Bednarczyk, and Robert Jaworski. The area at Charles de Gaulle Roundabout, where the monument was placed, was donated by the nearby Banking and Financial Centre. The monument was unveiled on 15 May 2005 by Michel Barnier, the minister of foreign affairs of France. The bronze sculpture was manufactured in Bielsko-Biała, Poland by Marek Żebrowski. The area at Charles de Gaulle Roundabout, where the monument was placed, was donated by the nearby Banking and Financial Centre.

== Characteristics ==
The monument is placed at Charles de Gaulle Roundabout in front of the Banking and Financial Centre, located at 6 and 12 New World Street. It consists of a bronze statue, depicting marching Charles de Gaulle, wearing a military uniform and a kepi hat. It is placed on a large pedestal, inscribed with text which reads "Charles de Gaulle; 1890–1970". In total, the monument has the height of 4 m (13.12 ft).
