= Le Vendôme Beirut Hotel =

Hotel in Beirut, Lebanon

Coordinates: 33.9017°N 35.4917°E

Le Vendôme Beirut Hotel was a five-star luxury hotel in Beirut, Lebanon. Considered one of Lebanon's most upmarket hotels, Le Vendôme is located in the Ras Beirut district of Beirut, on the shoreline of the Mediterranean Sea.

== History ==
Le Vendôme Hotel opened in 1964, with 125 rooms. It was taken over by La Société des Grands Hotels du Liban (SGHL) in 1974.

The hotel closed in 1975, with the outbreak of the Lebanese Civil War. It reopened in 1977, during a period of relative calm after the first phase of the war. On June 27, 1977, the hotel became an Inter-Continental Hotels franchise and was renamed Le Vendome Inter-Continental.

The hotel closed again due to the Civil War in 1983.

The hotel was restored by SGHL in the mid-1990s. InterContinental Hotels resumed management in 1995 and the hotel reopened with 51 rooms and 22 suites in November 1996 as Le Vendome Inter-Continental Beirut. In 2016, the hotel was taken over by SGHL's creditors, Bank Audi and BankMed, when SGHL was unable to repay a $100 million loan. InterContinental ceased managing the hotel in 2020, when it closed due to the COVID-19 pandemic. The property was sold on June 30, 2020, to Qatari investors linked to the royal family for $35 million.
