= Raouché =

Neighbourhood in Beirut, Lebanon

Coordinates: 33°53′N 35°28′E

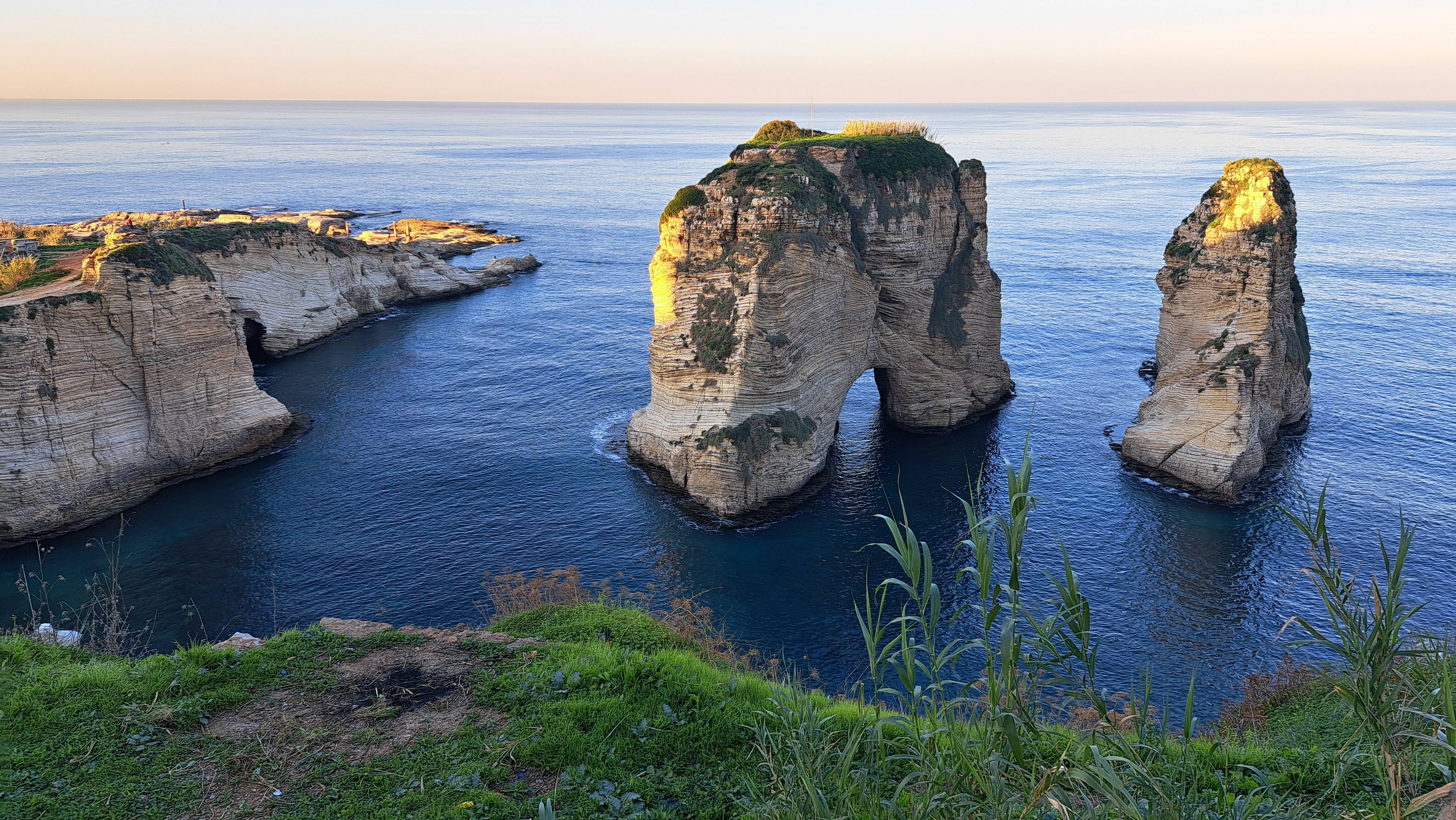
Pigeon Rock in Corniche Beirut in Raouché neighborhood.

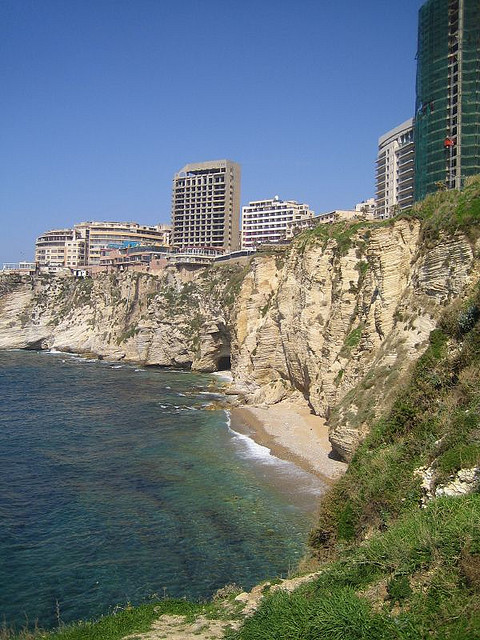
Beirut as seen from the pigeon rock

Raouché (Arabic: الروشة, romanized: ar-Rawše) is a residential and commercial neighborhood in Beirut, Lebanon. It is known for its upscale apartment buildings, numerous restaurants, and cliff-side cafés that line Avenue de Paris, which forms part of the Corniche Beirut.

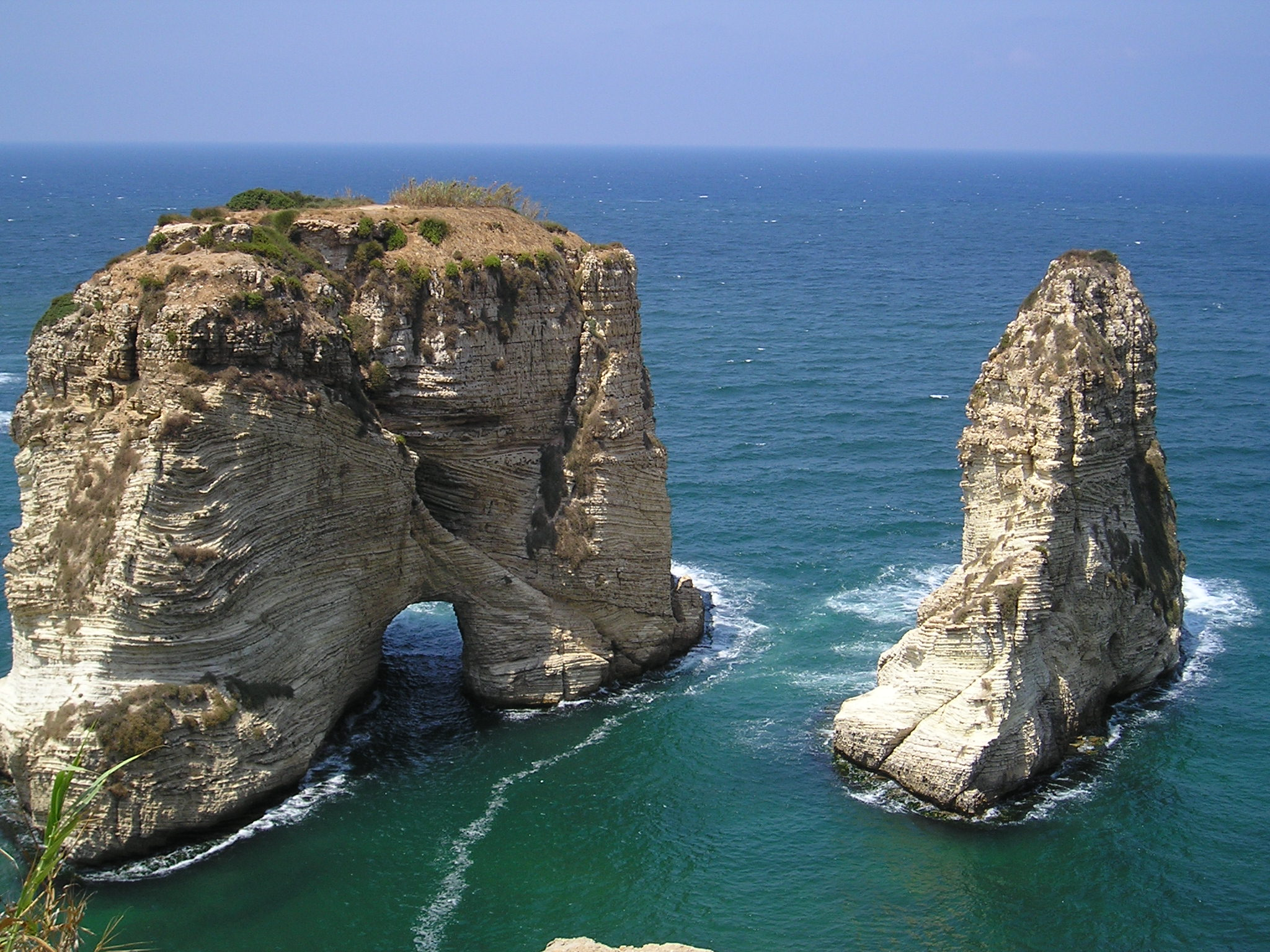
The Rock of Raouché, or Pigeon Rock

Off the coast of Raouché lies a natural landmark called the Rock of Raouché (also commonly known in English as Pigeon Rocks or the Pigeons' Rock), consisting of two large limestone sea stacks, 60 and 40 metres tall, the larger of which features a prominent natural arch.

== Etymology ==
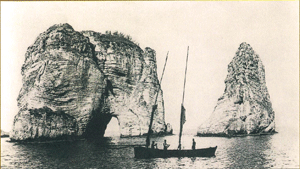
Raouché Rocks in the late 19th / early 20th century

The word raouche comes from the French word “rocher”, which means rock.

== History ==
The shores near Raouché have yielded the area's oldest evidence of human existence, flints and basic stone tools, which are displayed in the American University of Beirut Archaeological Museum.

=== Present status ===
The area adjacent to Raouché, called 'Dalieh', is presently in the process of being sold to real-estate developers. A campaign was started early 2014 against the privatization of Raouché and the adjacent area-called al-Dalieh-which was initially titled "The last that remains".

In September 2025, the Rock of Raouché was used as a backdrop for an illuminated projection by Hezbollah of its former leaders Hassan Nasrallah and Hashem Safieddine to commemorate their assassinations by Israel in 2024, prompting criticism from prime minister Nawaf Salam.

== See also ==
- Beirut Central District
- Avenue de Paris
- Ras Beirut
- Beirut
