= Saint George Bay =

Bay of Beirut

Coordinates: 33°55′10″N 35°33′3″E

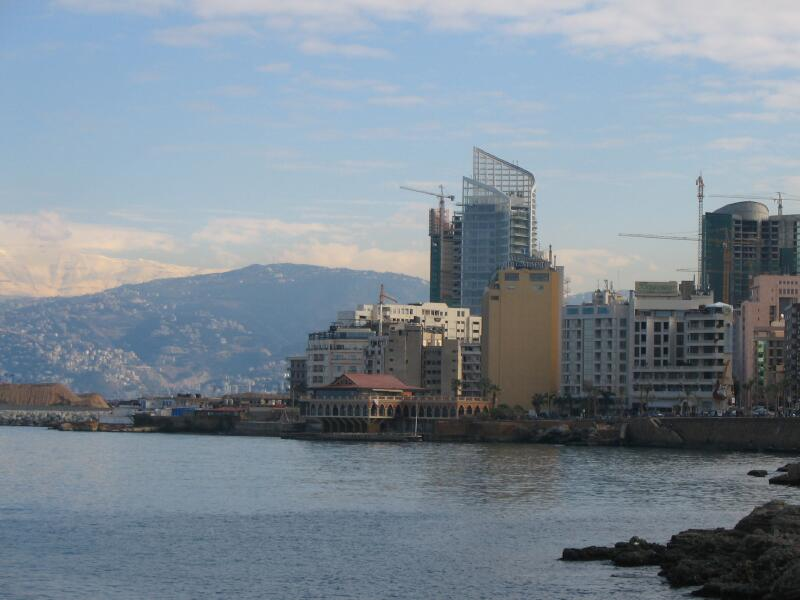
View of St. George Bay and snow-capped Mount Sannine from the Corniche

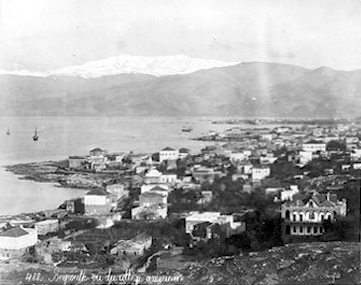
Saint George Bay in 1880

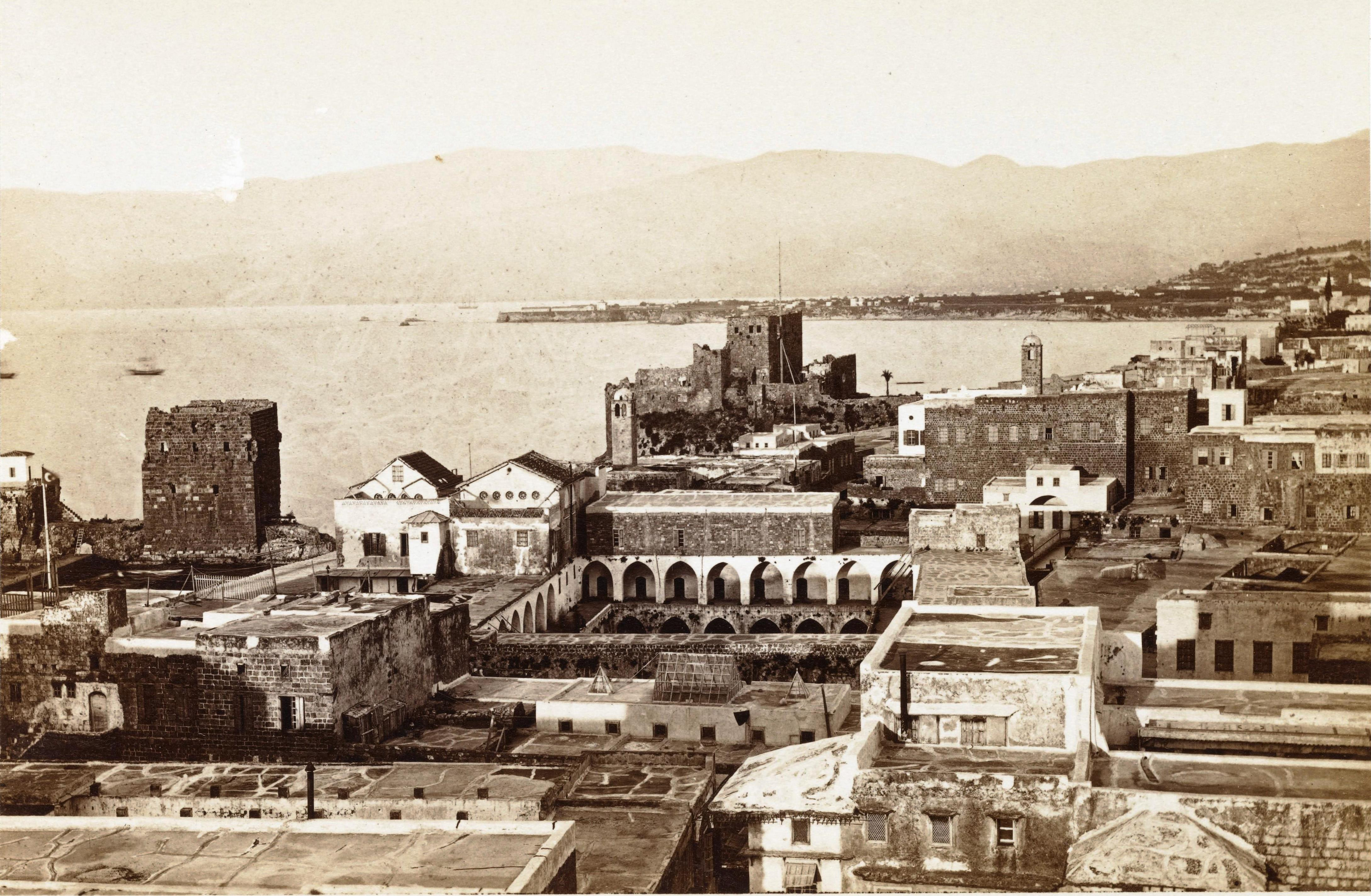
Beirut Castle (center) and the tower of Burj-al-Musallah islet on the left, December 1869

Saint George Bay (Arabic: خليج سانت جورج), also known as the Bay of Beirut, is located on the northern coast of the city of Beirut in Lebanon. The Beirut River empties into the bay.

== Etymology ==
The bay is named after Saint George, a popular saint among Christian sects in the eastern Mediterranean.

== Location ==
The bay is situated north of Beirut and runs from the Cape of Ras Beirut, extending eastward and then northward until it reaches the marina of Dbayeh. High-rise apartment buildings and hotels overlook the bay and its palm-lined promenade, the Corniche. The Port of Beirut occupies the eastern part of the bay, as does the marina and the famous landmark, the Saint George Hotel. The hotel's name derives from the bay.

== Legend ==
According to legend, the bay is where Saint George slew the dragon at a grotto with seven caves, located at the mouth of the Beirut River. After killing the dragon, St. George washed his hands in the waters of the river, which locals believed for centuries had curative value, and so the site became popular with pilgrims, who stuck pebbles on the walls of the caves or tied cloth to the gates, and when their prayers were answered, they came back and untied the cloths.

== Sporting events ==
The bay hosted the world sailing championships in the Fireball class in 1971 and was the scene of an annual international water ski championship from 1955 until the beginning of the war.
