= Avenue de Paris =

Seaside street in Beirut, Lebanon

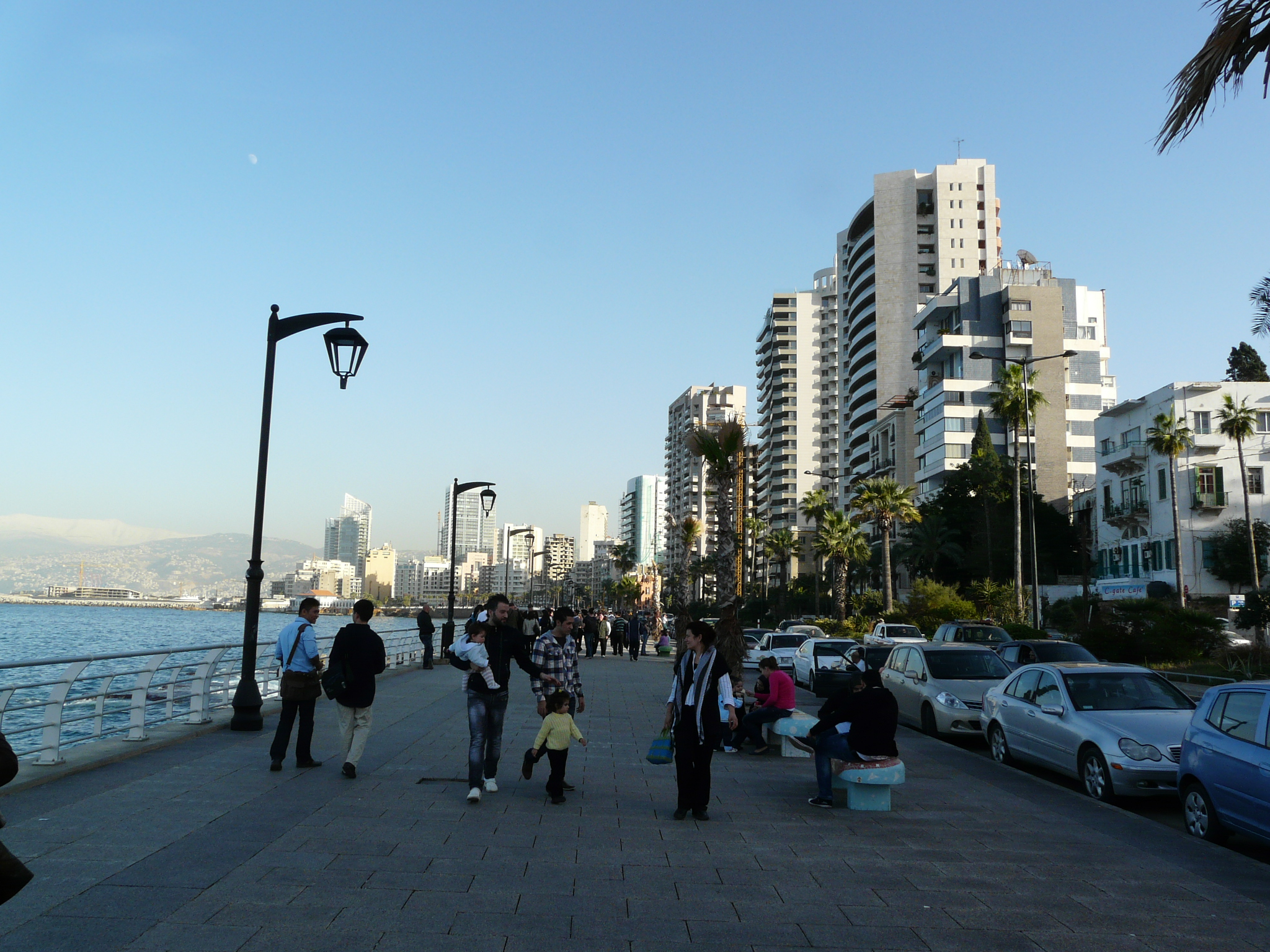
Promenading on Avenue de Paris section of the Corniche Beirut

Avenue de Paris is a seaside, palm-lined street in Beirut, Lebanon. The avenue, which forms with Avenue General de Gaulle the Corniche Beirut promenade, is popular with rollerbladers, cyclists and joggers.

== Benches ==
The municipality of Beirut initiated in 2001 an embellishment of the Avenue de Paris section of the Corniche Beirut, a project that was conceived and designed by Lebanese artist, Lena Kelekian. The project included the replacement of the 76 cement benches with new ones covered with colorful cut ceramics as well as a Mega Chessboard on the widest section of the sidewalk.

== U.S. Embassy ==
The U.S. embassy, which was attacked on April 8, 1983, was located on Avenue de Paris. The embassy is now located in Awkar, a hilly suburb north of Beirut.

== In Literature ==
- The Tomato War and Theomachy By Edmond Y. Nicolas

"Eddoum and René left the American University of Beirut and were speeding along the seashore; the Cornish Avenue, Rue de Paris, Rue Ibin Sina, making a right turn by the Phoenicia Hotel to Fakher ad- din Avenue that would connect them. . ."

== See also ==
- Beirut Central District
- Ras Beirut
- Beirut
