= Statue of Charles de Gaulle, London =

Statue by Angela Conner

Coordinates: 51°30′20″N 0°08′03″W

Statue of Charles de Gaulle
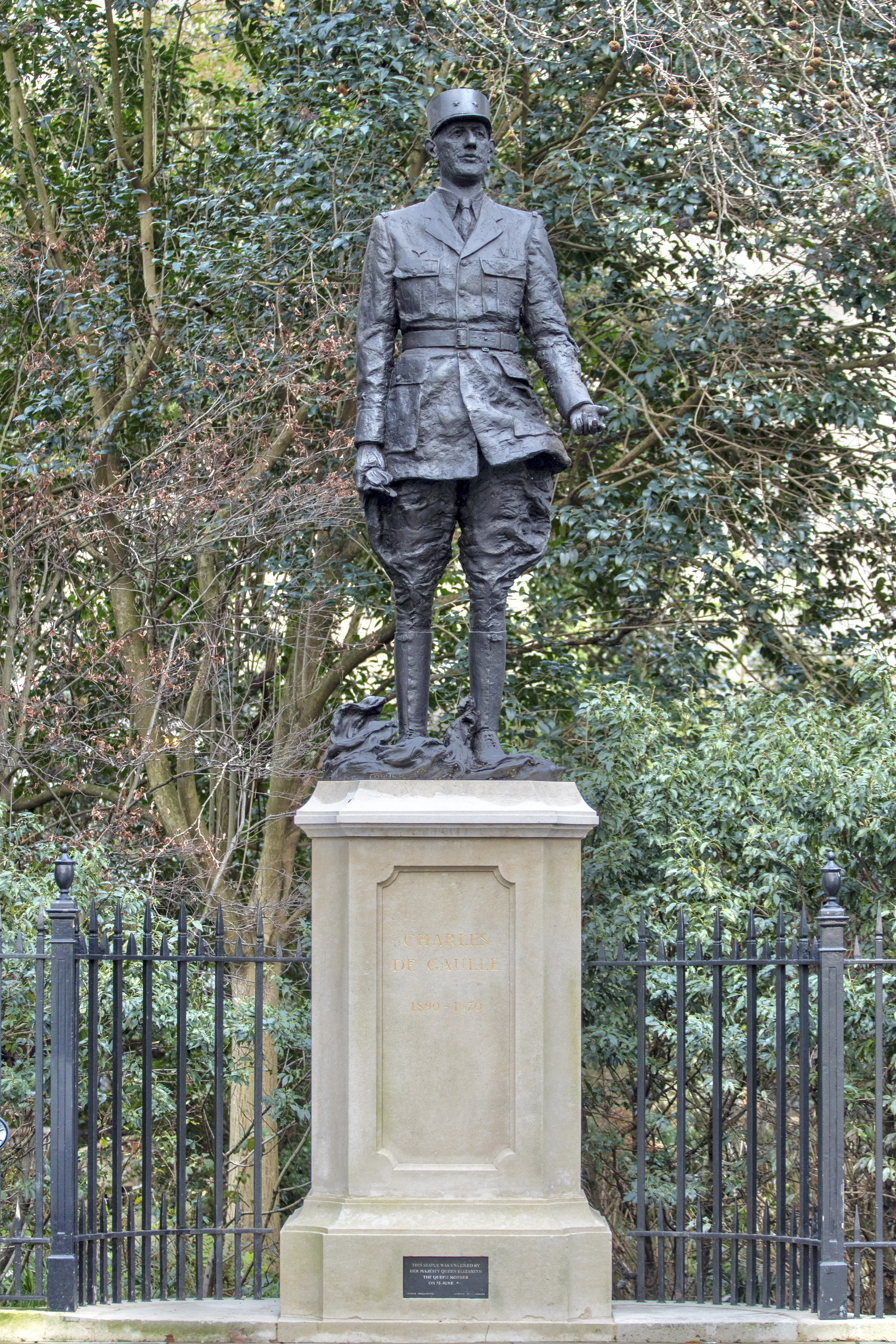
- Statue of Charles de Gaulle in 2026
- Artist: Angela Conner
- Year: 1993
- Location: Carlton Gardens, London

A bronze statue of Charles de Gaulle stands in Carlton Gardens in the City of Westminster, London. Charles de Gaulle, the leader of Free France, set up his government in exile at No. 4 Carlton Gardens.

The statue was campaigned for by Mary Soames, the daughter of De Gaulle's contemporary Winston Churchill. It was unveiled by Queen Elizabeth The Queen Mother on 23 June 1993 in the presence of Jacques Chirac, at that time Mayor of Paris, and the President of the National Assembly Philippe Séguin, as well as De Gaulle's chauffeur-translator Olivia Jordan. The architect was Bernard Wiehahn and the sculptor Angela Conner. De Gaulle is portrayed in the uniform of a brigadier-general. The statue is one of 39 in London maintained by English Heritage, the majority of which are in Westminster.

The French Embassy commemorates De Gaulle at the statue annually. President of France Emmanuel Macron laid a wreath on his visit to London on 18 June 2020, the 80th anniversary of De Gaulle's resistance speech.

The enthusiastic fundraising for the statue by the British public led to calls for a statue of Churchill to be placed in the French capital, which was unveiled in 1998.
