= Avenue Charles de Gaulle =

Thoroughfare in N'Djamena, Chad

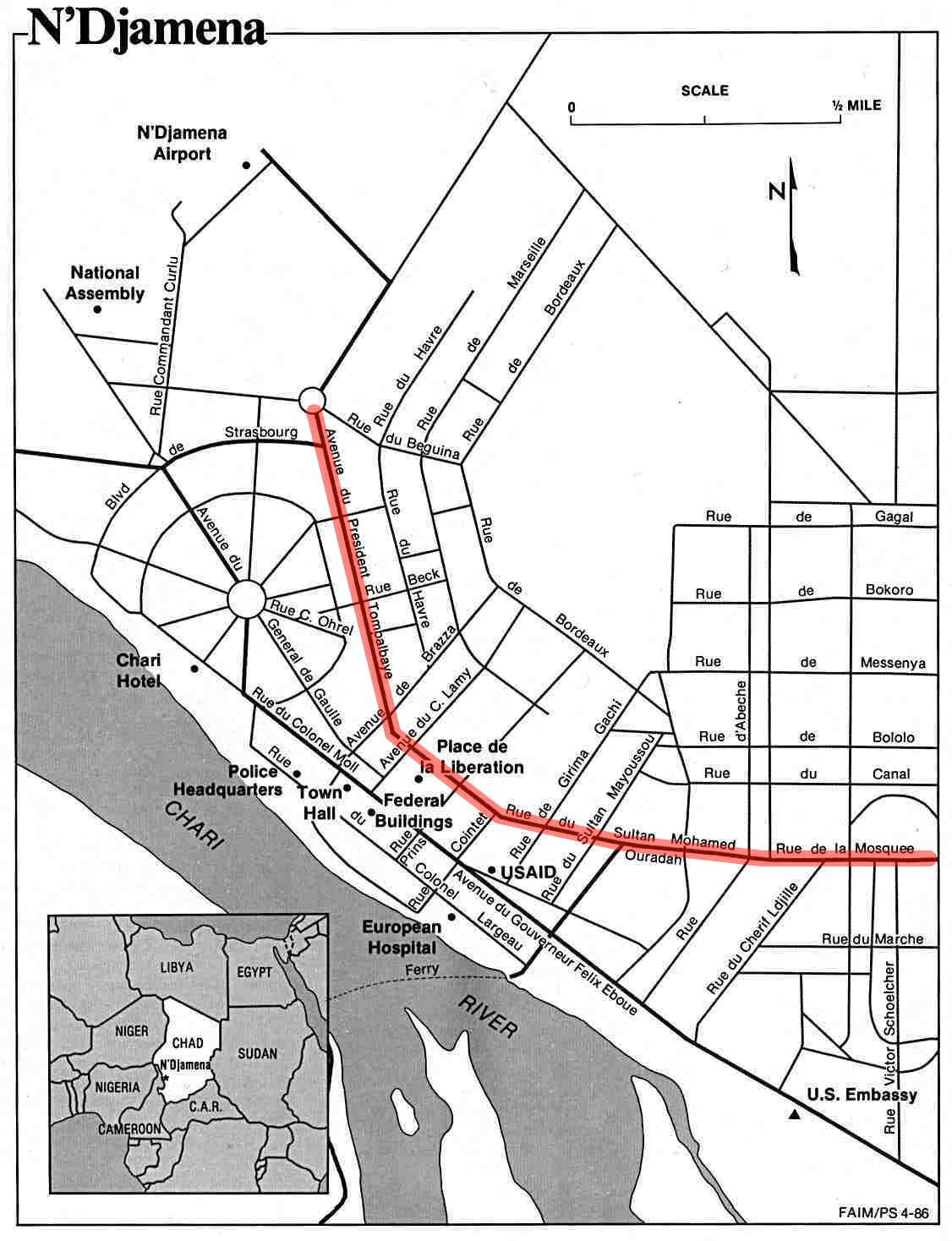
- Avenue Charles de Gaulle outlined on a 1986 map
- Interactive map of Avenue Charles de Gaulle
- Former names: Avenue du President Tombalbaye, Rue du Sultan Mohamed, Rue de la Mosquee
- Namesake: Charles de Gaulle
- Location: N'Djamena, Chad

Avenue Charles de Gaulle is one of the main streets and principal commercial avenue of N'Djamena, the capital of Chad, which is named after former French president Charles de Gaulle. It runs in a roughly west–east direction through the city. The western end of the road is the commercial district and the location of many foreign embassies and colonial-era buildings The avenue is one of the areas of the city where shopping is concentrated in, including the area near the Grande Mosquée, and includes bars, restaurants and markets. The western end of the avenue is part of the area of the city known as the 'European Quarter' and is regarded as a place for the wealthy.

== Route ==
The western end of the avenue is at the intersection with Route de Farcha, near the N'Djamena International Airport. The road then heads in a southerly direction, passing through the Point de la Garde roundabout ( 12°07′18.17″N 15°02′03.19″E ), and from here to the Point du Sultan Kasser roundabout (12°06′47.28″N 15°02′10.77″E) are some of the larger buildings of the city. (Not to be confused with the similarly named Avenue General de Gaulle running close by to the south.) The avenue then turns south-east, passing the Palais de Justice, N'Djamena cathedral and Plaza de la liberation on the south side and Camp Militaire des Martyrs on the north, before turning to an easterly direction passing between the Grande Mosquée and the Grand Marché (the central market and the historic centre of the city, around 12°06′35.13″N 15°03′00.86″E ). It then heads east through the Paris Congo residential area and towards other residential areas of the city.

The General Services office compound of the US embassy is located there. Also is the Financial Bank Tchad and Nigerian embassy. The west end of the avenue houses high walled villas where many expatriates live.

The avenue has wholesale stores which are serviced by carts to supply them, on a 1 kilometre (1,100 yd) route from customs on the way from Kousseri, Cameroon.

== History ==
While many formerly French street names in Chad were Africanized during the Authenticité program under the presidency of François Tombalbaye, including the city itself (formerly Fort Lamy), the avenue was described as an exception to this in 1974. However, a 1986 map shows what is now the Avenue Charles de Gaulle labelled with three different names "Avenue du President Tombalbaye", "Rue du Sultan Mohamed Ouradah" and "Rue de la Mosquee".

In 1981 there was much damage to buildings along the street due to machine gun fire. The street was the site of destroyed cars and damage from the Battle of N'Djamena in February 2008. At this time the avenue was also cut off by heavy weaponry and was said to be severely affected.
