= Beirut =

Capital and largest city of Lebanon

Beirut بيروت
- Capital city and municipality
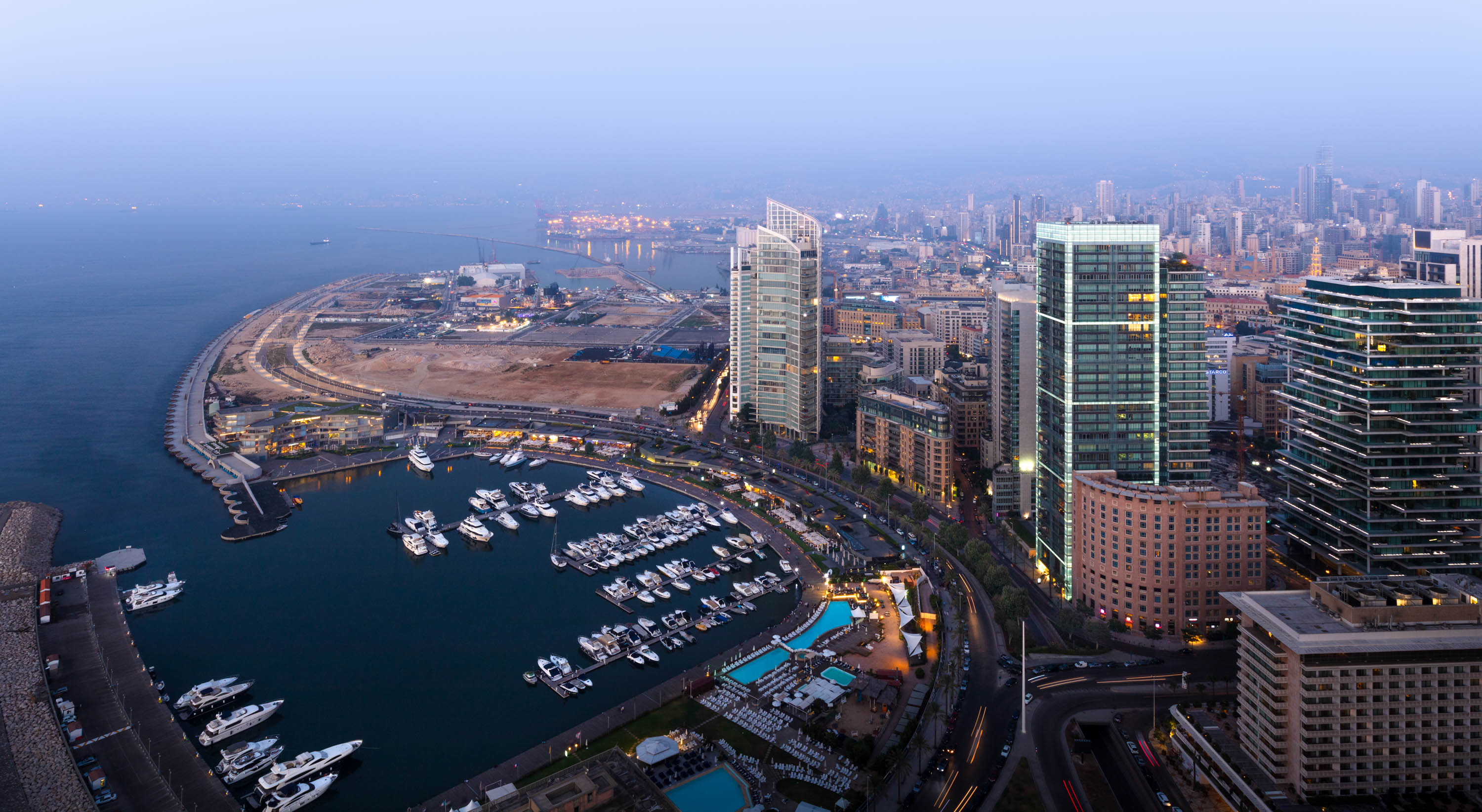
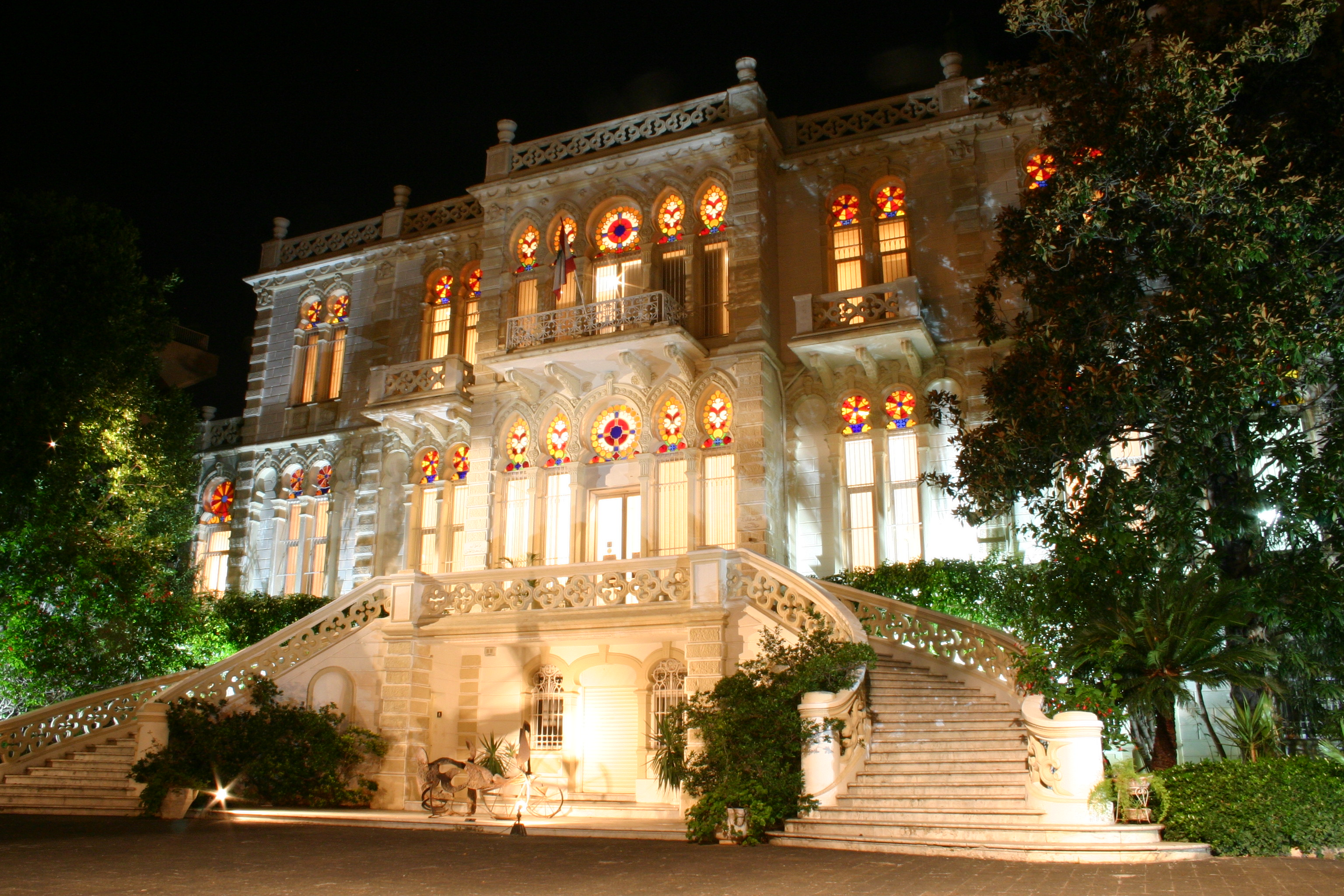
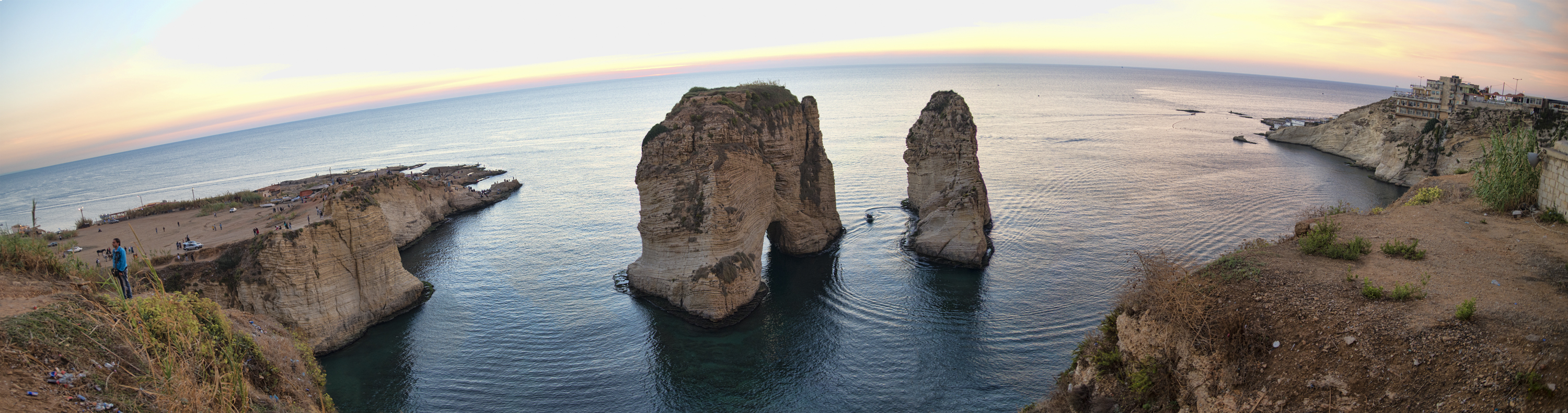
- Zaitunay Bay Cathedral of Saint George and Mohammad Al-Amin Mosque Sursock Museum Pigeon Rocks of Raouché

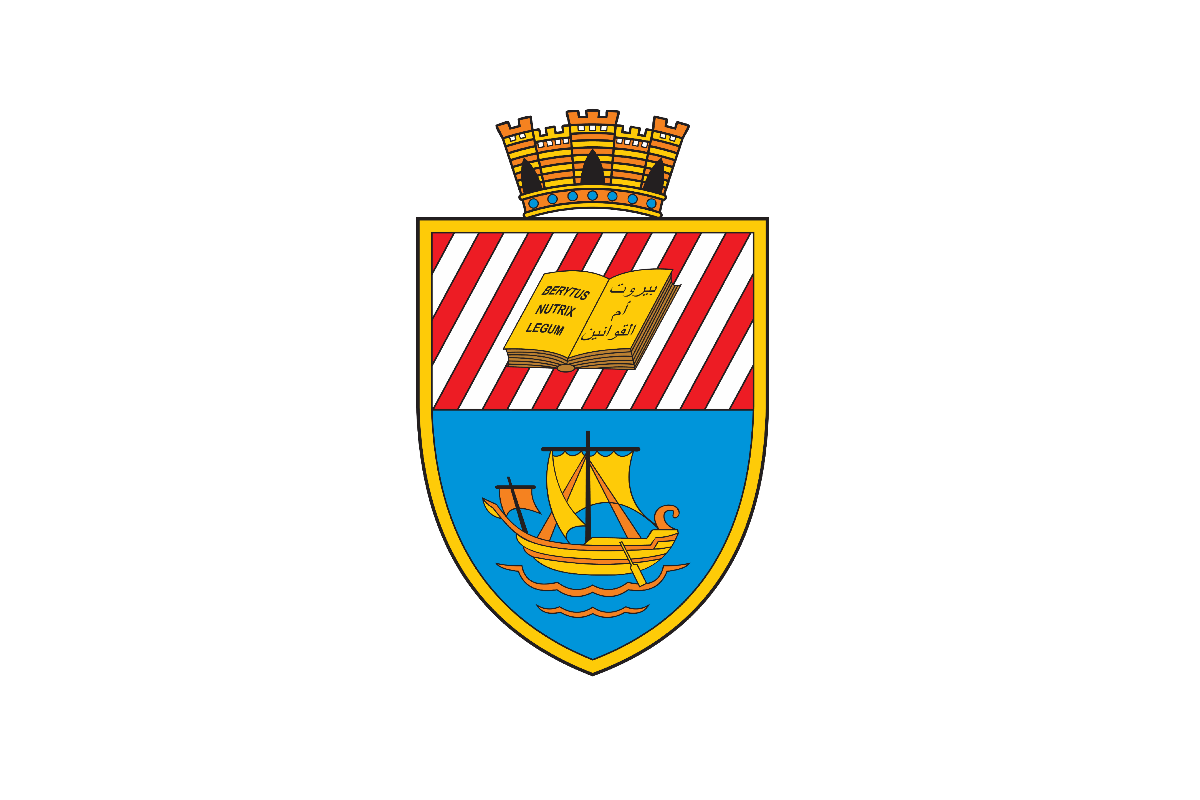
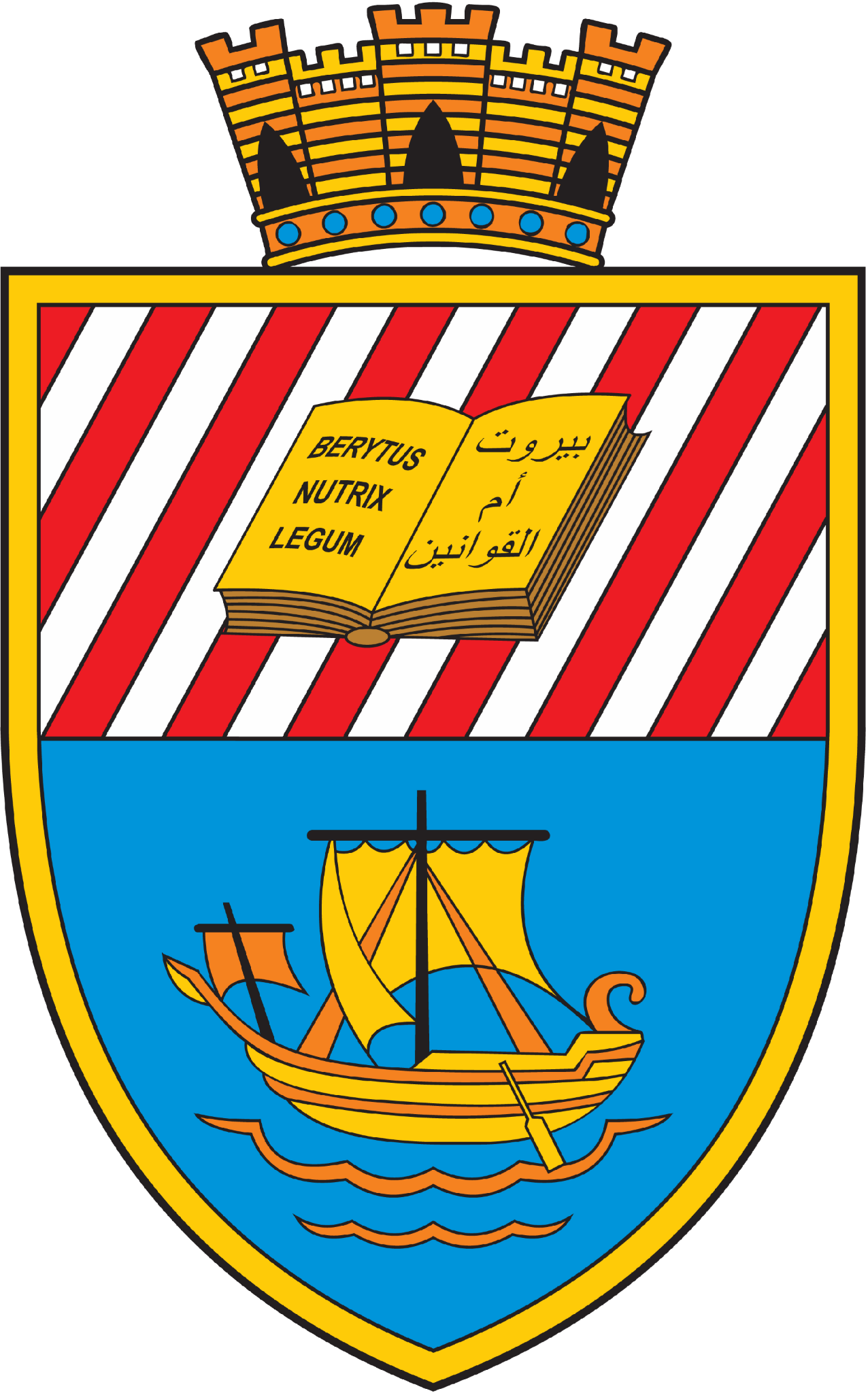
- Flag Coat of arms
- Nickname: Paris of the East
- Motto: Berytus Nutrix Legum (Latin); Beirut, mother of laws
- Interactive map of Beirut
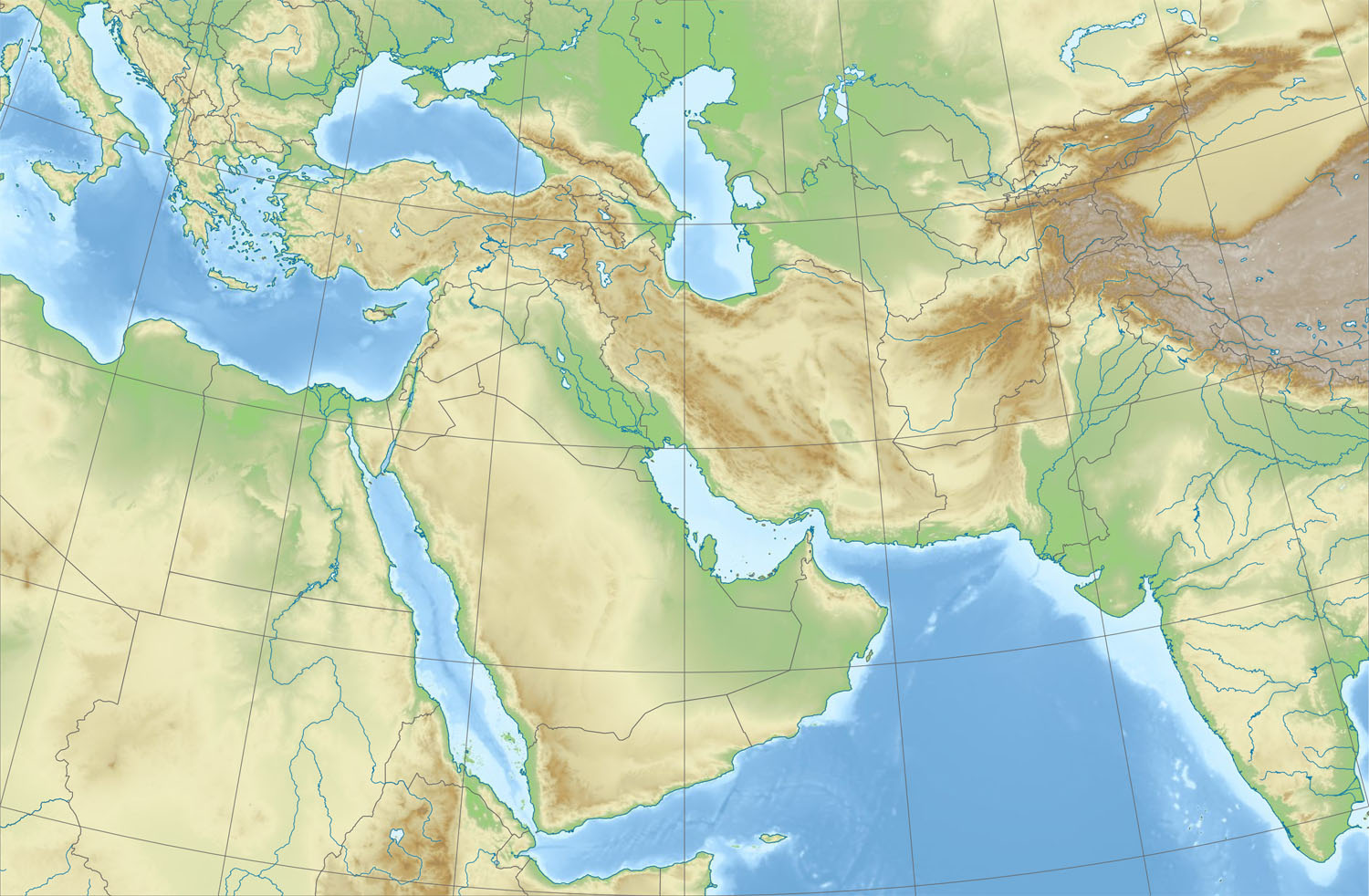
- Location within Lebanon Location within Middle East Location within Asia
- Coordinates: 33°53′53″N 35°30′21″E
- Country: Lebanon
- Governorate: Beirut

Government
  - Governor: Marwan Abboud (Independent)
  - Mayor: Ibrahim Zeidan (National Dialogue Party)

Area
  - Capital city and municipality: 19 km^{2} (7.3 sq mi)
  - Metro: 35 km^{2} (14 sq mi)

Population (2017)
  - Capital city and municipality: c. 433,249
  - Rank: 1st
  - Density: 23,000/km^{2} (60,000/sq mi)
  - Metro: c. 3.5 million
- Demonym: Beiruti
- Time zone: UTC+02:00 (EET)
  - Summer (DST): UTC+03:00 (EEST)
- Area code: +961 (01)
- ISO 3166 code: LB-BA
- Patron saint: Saint George
- Website: www.beirut.gov.lb

Beirut (/beɪˈruːt/ bay-ROOT; Arabic: بيروت, romanised: Bayrūt) is the capital and largest city of Lebanon. As of 2025, Greater Beirut has a population of 2.4 million, just under half of Lebanon's population, which makes it the twelfth-largest city in the Levant region and the sixteenth-largest in the Arab world. The city is situated on a peninsula at the midpoint of Lebanon's Mediterranean coast. Beirut has been inhabited for more than 5,000 years, making it one of the oldest cities in the world.

Beirut is Lebanon's seat of government and plays a central role in the Lebanese economy, with many banks and corporations based in the city. Beirut is an important seaport for the country and region, and rated a Beta- World City by the Globalization and World Cities Research Network. Beirut was severely damaged by the Lebanese Civil War, the 2006 Lebanon War, and the 2020 explosion in the Port of Beirut, and was subsequently rebuilt after each of these events. Its architectural and demographic structure underwent major change in recent decades.

== Etymology ==
The English name Beirut is an early transcription of the Arabic name Bayrūt (بيروت). The same name's transcription into French is Beyrouth [bɛ.ʁut], which was sometimes used during Lebanon's French mandate. The Arabic name derives from Phoenician bēʾrūt (𐤁𐤀𐤓𐤕 bʾrt). This was a modification of the Phoenician word bīʾrōt later bēʾrūt, meaning "wells", in reference to the site's accessible water table. The name is first attested in the 14th century BC, when it was mentioned in three Akkadian cuneiform tablets of the Amarna letters, letters sent by King Ammunira of Biruta to Amenhotep III or Amenhotep IV of Egypt. Biruta was also mentioned in the Amarna letters from King Rib-Hadda of Byblos.

The Greeks hellenised the name as Bērytós (Ancient Greek: Βηρυτός), which the Romans latinised as Berytus. (Note: The Roman name was taken in 1934 for the archaeological journal published by the Faculty of Arts and Sciences at the American University of Beirut.) When it attained the status of a Roman colony, it was notionally refounded and its official name was emended to Colonia Iulia Augusta Felix Berytus to include its imperial sponsors.

At the time of the crusades, the city was known in French as Barut or Baruth.

== History ==
The earliest settlement of Beirut was on an island in the Beirut River, but the channel that separated it from the banks silted up and the island ceased to be. Excavations in the downtown area have unearthed layers of Phoenician, Hellenistic, Roman, Byzantine, Arab, Crusader, Persian and Ottoman remains.

=== Prehistory ===
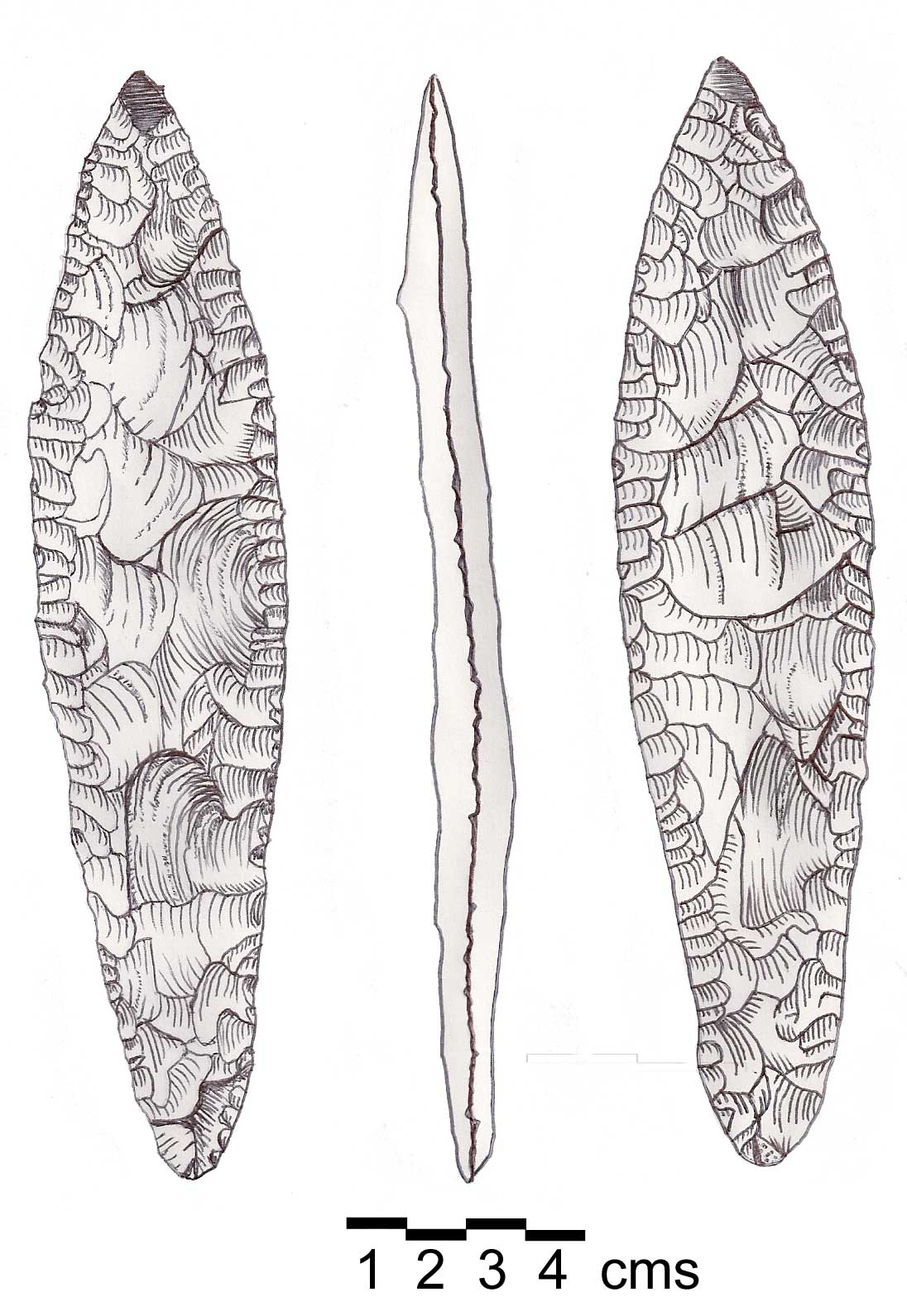
Canaanean blade. Suggested to be part of a javelin. Fresh grey flint, both sides showing pressure flaking. Somewhat narrower at the base, suggesting a haft. Polished at the extreme point. Found on land of the Lebanese Evangelical School for Girls in the Patriarchate area of Beirut

Beirut was settled over 5,000 years ago, and there is evidence that the surrounding area had already been inhabited for tens of thousands of years prior to this. Several prehistoric archaeological sites have been discovered within the urban area of Beirut, revealing flint tools from sequential periods dating from the Middle Palaeolithic and Upper Paleolithic through the Neolithic to the Bronze Age.

Beirut I (Minet el-Hosn) was listed as "the town of Beirut" (French: Beyrouth ville) by Louis Burkhalter and said to be on the beach near the Orient and Bassoul hotels on the Avenue des Français in central Beirut. The site was discovered by Louis Lartet (1840–1899) in 1894 and discussed by Godefroy Zumoffen in 1900. The flint industry from the site was described as Mousterian and is held by the Museum of Fine Arts of Lyon.

Beirut II (Umm el-Khatib) was suggested by Burkhalter to have been south of Tarik el Jedideh, where P.E. Gigues discovered a Copper Age flint industry at around 100 metres (328 feet) above sea level. The site had been built on and destroyed by 1948.

Beirut III (Furn esh-Shebbak), listed as Plateau Tabet, was suggested to have been located on the left bank of the Beirut River. Burkhalter suggested that it was west of the Damascus road, although this determination has been criticised by Lorraine Copeland. P. E. Gigues discovered a series of Neolithic flint tools on the surface along with the remains of a structure suggested to be a hut circle. Auguste Bergy discussed polished axes that were also found at this site, which has now completely disappeared as a result of construction and urbanisation of the area.

Beirut IV (Furn esh-Shebbak, river banks) was also on the left bank of the river and on either side of the road leading eastwards from the Furn esh Shebbak police station towards the river that marked the city limits. The area was covered in red sand that represented Quaternary river terraces. The site was found by Jesuit Father Dillenseger and published by fellow Jesuits Godefroy Zumoffen, Raoul Describes and Auguste Bergy. Collections from the site were made by Bergy, Describes and another Jesuit, Paul Bovier-Lapierre. Many Middle Paleolithic flint tools were found on the surface and in side gullies that drain into the river. They included around 50 varied bifaces accredited to the Acheulean period, some with a lustrous sheen, now held at the Museum of Lebanese Prehistory. Henri Fleisch also found an Emireh point amongst material from the site, which has now disappeared beneath buildings.

Beirut V (Nahr Beirut, Beirut River) was discovered by Dillenseger and said to be in an orchard of mulberry trees on the left bank of the river, near the river mouth, and to be close to the railway station and bridge to Tripoli. Levallois flints and bones and similar surface material were found amongst brecciated deposits. The area has now been built on.

Beirut VI (Patriarchate) was a site discovered while building on the property of the Lebanese Evangelical School for Girls in the Patriarchate area of Beirut. It was notable for the discovery of a finely styled Canaanean blade javelin suggested to date to the early or middle Neolithic periods of Byblos and which is held in the school library.

Beirut VII, located at the Rivoli Cinema and Byblos Cinema sites near the Bourj in the Rue el Arz area, consists of two sites discovered by Lorraine Copeland, Peter Wescombe, and Marina Hayek in 1964 and examined by Diana Kirkbride and Roger Saidah. One site was behind the parking lot of the Byblos Cinema and showed collapsed walls, pits, floors, charcoal, pottery and flints. The other, overlooking a cliff west of the Rivoli Cinema, was composed of three layers resting on limestone bedrock. Fragments of blades and broad flakes were recovered from the first layer of black soil, above which some Bronze Age pottery was recovered in a layer of grey soil. Pieces of Roman pottery and mosaics were found in the upper layer. Middle Bronze Age tombs were found in this area, and the ancient tell of Beirut is thought to be in the Bourj area.

=== Phoenician period ===
The Phoenician port of Beirut was located between Rue Foch and Rue Allenby on the north coast. The port or harbour was excavated and reported on several years ago and now lies buried under the city. Another suggested port or dry dock was claimed to have been discovered around 1 kilometre (0.62 miles) to the west in 2011 by a team of Lebanese archaeologists from the Directorate General of Antiquities of Lebanese University. Controversy arose on 26 June 2012 when authorisation was given by Lebanese Minister of Culture Gaby Layoun for a private company called Venus Towers Real Estate Development Company to destroy the ruins (archaeological site BEY194) in the $500 million construction project of three skyscrapers and a garden behind Hotel Monroe in downtown Beirut. Two later reports by an international committee of archaeologists appointed by Layoun, including Hanz Curver, and an expert report by Ralph Pederson, a member of the institute of Nautical Archaeology and now teaching in Marburg, Germany, dismissed the claims that the trenches were a port, on various criteria. The exact function of site BEY194 may never be known, and the issue raised heated emotions and led to increased coverage on the subject of Lebanese heritage in the press.

=== Hellenistic period ===
In 140 BC, the Phoenician city was destroyed by Diodotus Tryphon during his conflict with Antiochus VII Sidetes for the throne of the Hellenistic Seleucid monarchy. Laodicea in Phoenicia was built upon the same site on a more conventional Hellenistic plan. Present-day Beirut overlies this ancient one, and little archaeology was carried out until after the civil war in 1991. The salvage excavations after 1993 have yielded new insights into the layout and history of this period of Beirut's history. Public architecture included several areas and buildings.

Mid-1st-century coins from Berytus bear the head of Tyche, goddess of fortune; (Note: Berytos, part of Phoenicia, remained under Ptolemaic control until 200 BC. After the Battle of Panium, Phoenicia and southern Syria passed to the Seleucids. In the 2nd century BC, the city, then known as Laodikeia, minted two main kinds of coins: civic issues in its own name and issues that also acknowledged the reigning Seleucid king. The civic bronze coins showed Tyche on the obverse. The reverse often showed Poseidon or Astarte standing on a ship's prow, together with the letters BH or ΛΑ and the monogram Φ, abbreviations referring to Berytos/Laodikeia and Phoenicia. A few also carry the Phoenician legends LL'DK' 'S BKN 'N or LL'DK' 'M BKN 'N, usually understood to mean "Laodikeia in Canaan" or "Mother Laodikeia in Canaan". Coins struck under Seleucid rulers such as Antiochus IV Epiphanes, Alexander I Balas, Demetrius II Nicator, and Alexander II Zabinas instead placed the ruler's portrait on the obverse. Their reverses named the king in Greek and the city in Phoenician, along with the letters ΛΑ and the monogram Φ. After c. 123 BC, the Phoenician formulas "Laodikeia in Canaan" and "Mother Laodikeia in Canaan" are no longer attested.) on the reverse, the city's symbol appears: a dolphin entwines an anchor. This symbol was later taken up by the early printer Aldus Manutius in 15th century Venice. After the Seleucid Empire faced a state of civil war and decline, King Tigranes the Great of the Kingdom of Armenia conquered Beirut and placed it under effective Armenian control. However, after the Battle of Tigranocerta, Armenia forever lost its holdings in Syria and Beirut was conquered by Roman general Pompey.

=== Roman period ===
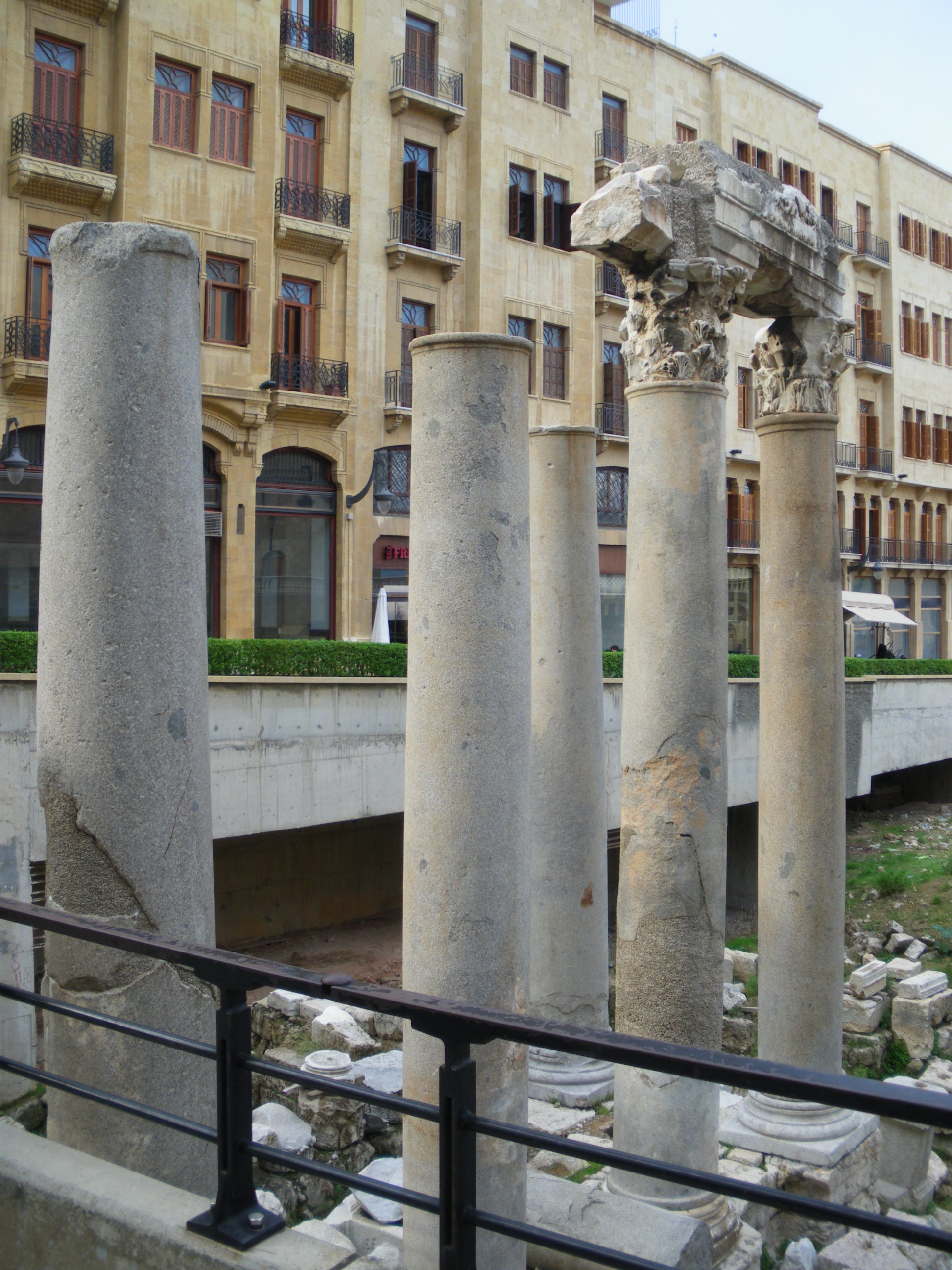
Roman Columns of Basilica near the Forum of Berytus

Laodicea was conquered by Pompey in 64 BC and the name Berytus was restored to it. The city was assimilated into the Roman Empire, soldiers were sent there, and large building projects were undertaken. From the 1st century BC, the Bekaa Valley served as a source of grain for the Roman provinces of the Levant and even for Rome itself. Under Claudius, Berytus expanded to reach the Bekaa Valley and include Heliopolis (Baalbek). The city was settled by Roman colonists who promoted agriculture in the region.

As a result of this settlement, the city quickly became Romanised, and the city became the only mainly Latin-speaking area in the Syria-Phoenicia province. In 14 BC, during the reign of Herod the Great, Berytus became a colony, one of four in the Syria-Phoenicia region and the only one with full Italian rights (ius Italicum) exempting its citizens from imperial taxation. Beirut was considered the most Roman city in the eastern provinces of the Roman Empire. Furthermore, the veterans of two Roman legions were established in the city of Berytus by emperor Augustus: the 5th Macedonian and the 3rd Gallic Legions.

Berytus's law school was widely known; two of Rome's most famous jurists, Papinian and Ulpian, were natives of Phoenicia and taught there under the Severan emperors. Ecclesiastical historian Sozomen studied at the law school in Beirut between 400 and 402. When Justinian assembled his Pandects in the 6th century, a large part of the corpus of laws was derived from these two jurists, and in AD 533 Justinian recognised the school as one of the three official law schools of the empire.

In 551, a major earthquake struck Berytus, causing widespread damage. The earthquake reduced cities along the coast to ruins and killed many, 30,000 in Berytus alone by some measurements. As a result, the students of the law school were transferred to Sidon.

Salvage excavations since 1993 have yielded new insights in the layout and history of Roman Berytus. Public architecture included several bath complexes, Colonnaded Streets, a circus and theatre; residential areas were excavated in the Garden of Forgiveness, Martyrs' Square and the Beirut Souks.

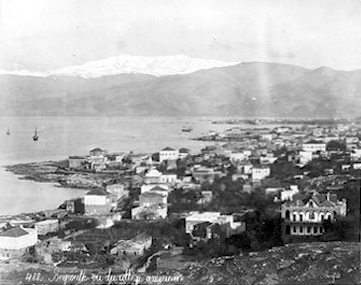
View of Beirut with snow-capped Mount Sannine in the background – 19th century

=== Middle Ages ===
Beirut was conquered by the Muslims in 635. As a trading centre of the eastern Mediterranean, Beirut was as important as Acre (in modern-day Israel) during the Middle Ages. From 1110 to 1291, the town and Lordship of Beirut was part of the Kingdom of Jerusalem. The city was taken by Saladin in 1187 and recaptured in 1197 by Henry I of Brabant as part of the German Crusade of 1197. John of Ibelin, known as the Old Lord of Beirut, was granted the lordship of the city in 1204. He rebuilt the city after its destruction by the Ayyubids and also built the House of Ibelin palace in Beirut.

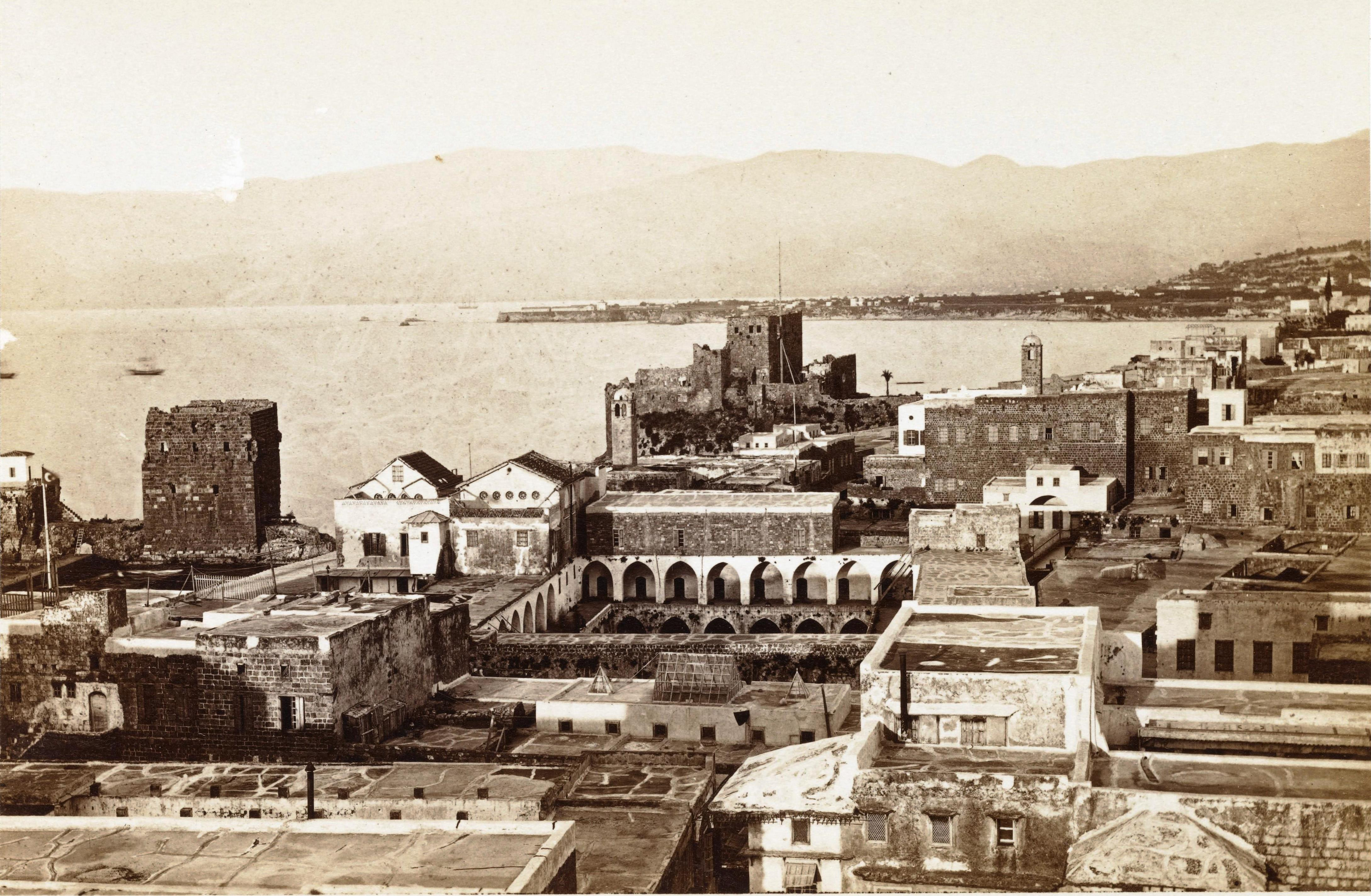
Beirut Castle and waterfront, 1868

In 1291 Beirut was captured and the Crusaders expelled by the Mamluk army of Sultan al-Ashraf Khalil.

=== Ottoman rule ===
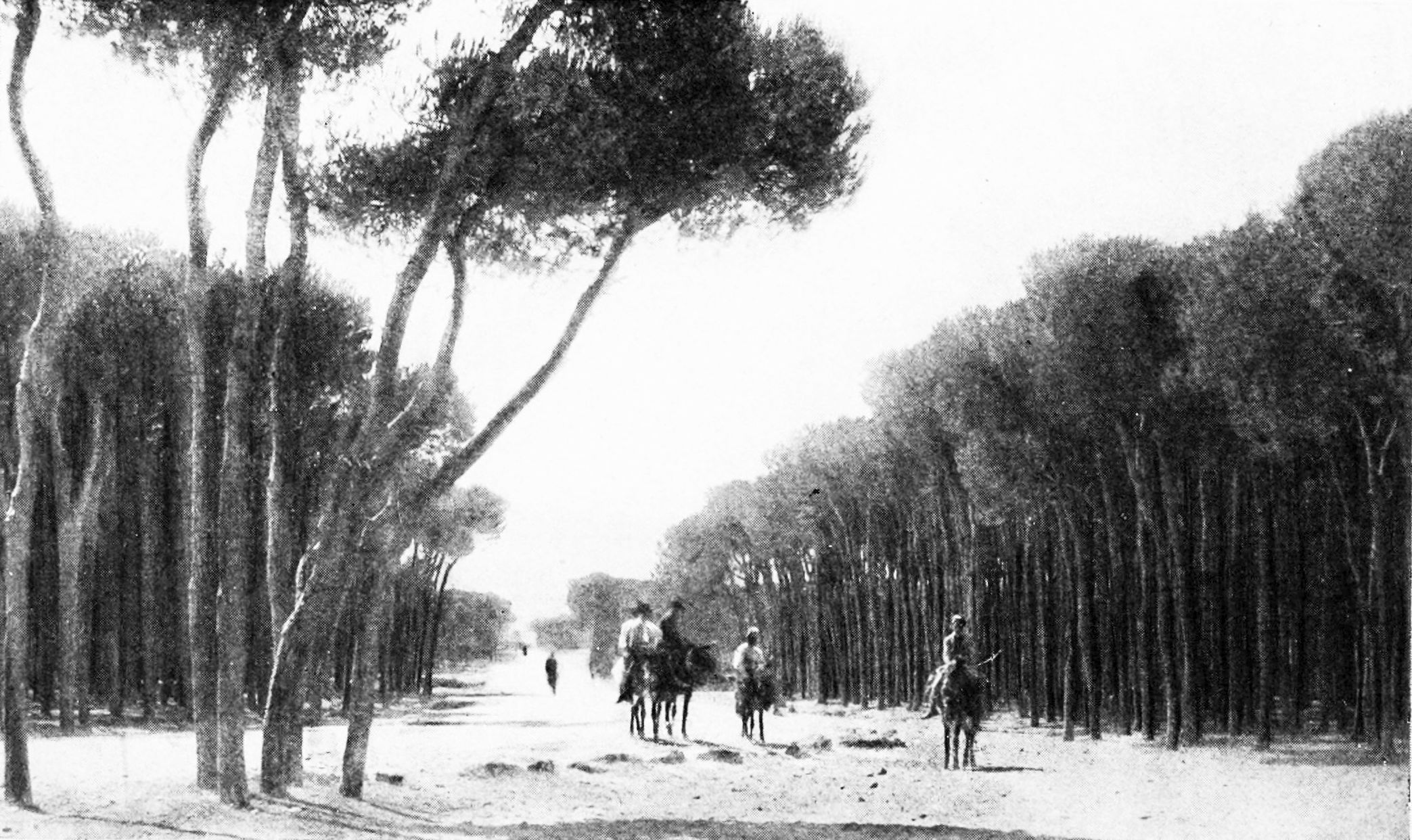
Stone pine forest of Beirut, 1914

Under the Ottoman sultan Selim I (1512–1520), the Ottomans conquered Syria including present-day Lebanon. Beirut was controlled by local Druze emirs throughout the Ottoman period. One of them, Fakhr-al-Din II, fortified it early in the 17th century, but the Ottomans reclaimed it in 1763. With the help of Damascus, Beirut successfully broke Acre's monopoly on Syrian maritime trade and for a few years supplanted it as the main trading centre in the region. During the succeeding epoch of rebellion against Ottoman hegemony in Acre under Jezzar Pasha and Abdullah Pasha, Beirut declined to a small town with a population of about 10,000 and was an object of contention between the Ottomans, the local Druze, and the Mamluks. After Ibrahim Pasha of Egypt captured Acre in 1832, Beirut began its revival.

After the Albanian fighter Tafil Buzi was interned and then pardoned by the Ottoman administration for his constant uprisings, he raised 3,000 Albanian mercenaries to fight in Lebanon; some of them became notorious shortly afterwards for having been responsible for the widespread disorders in Beirut.

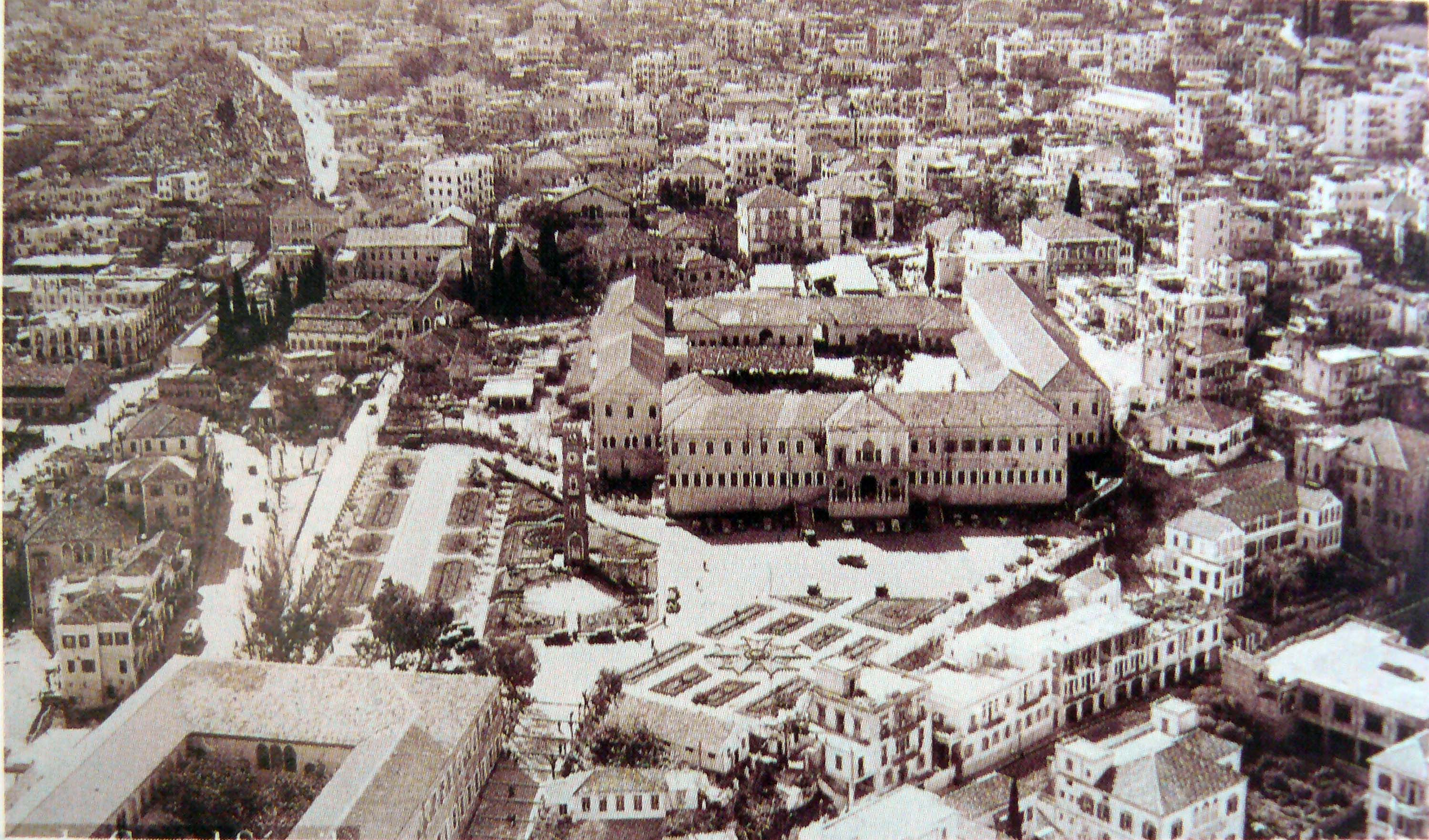
View of Beirut's Grand Serail, circa 1930

By the second half of the nineteenth century, Beirut was developing close commercial and political ties with European imperial powers, particularly France. European interests in Lebanese silk and other export products transformed the city into a major port and commercial centre. This boom in cross-regional trade allowed certain groups, such as the Sursock family, to establish trade and manufacturing empires that further strengthened Beirut's position as a key partner in the interests of imperial dynasties. Meanwhile, Ottoman power in the region continued to decline. Sectarian and religious conflicts, power vacuums, and changes in the political dynamics of the region culminated in the 1860 Lebanon conflict. Beirut became a destination for Maronite Christian refugees fleeing from the worst areas of the fighting on Mount Lebanon and in Damascus. This in turn altered the religious composition of Beirut itself, sowing the seeds of future sectarian and religious troubles there and in greater Lebanon. However, Beirut was able to prosper in the meantime. This was again a product of European intervention, and also a general realisation amongst the city's residents that commerce, trade, and prosperity depended on domestic stability. After petitions by the local bourgeois, the governor of Syria Vilayet Mehmed Rashid Pasha authorised the establishment of the Beirut Municipal Council, the first municipality established in the Arab provinces of the Empire. The council was elected by an assembly of city notables and played an instrumental role governing the city through the following decades.

==== Vilayet of Beirut ====
In 1888, Beirut was made capital of a vilayet (governorate) in Syria, including the sanjaks (prefectures) Latakia, Tripoli, Beirut, Acre and Bekaa. By this time, Beirut had grown into a cosmopolitan city and had close links with Europe and the United States. It also became a centre of missionary activity that spawned educational institutions such as the American University of Beirut. With the city provided with water from a British company and gas from a French one, silk exports to Europe came to dominate the local economy. After French engineers established a modern harbour in 1894 and a rail link across Lebanon to Damascus and Aleppo in 1907, much of the trade was carried by French ships to Marseille. French influence in the area soon exceeded that of any other European power. Though French infrastructure investments in the region were supportive, the local merchant elites were able to independently maintain economic power even after the end of the First World War. In contrast, although Beirut was not the only city to receive French attention in this time, it was able to leverage its critical position to its advantage over others (e.g. Damascus). The 1911 Encyclopædia Britannica reported a population consisting of 36,000 Muslims, 77,000 Christians, 2,500 Jews, 400 Druze and 4,100 foreigners. At the start of the 20th century, Salim Ali Salam was one of the most prominent figures in Beirut, holding numerous public positions including deputy from Beirut to the Ottoman parliament and President of the Municipality of Beirut. Given his modern way of life, the emergence of Salim Ali Salam as a public figure constituted a transformation in terms of the social development of the city.

An aerial panoramic view of Beirut in the last third of the 19th century

In his 2003 book entitled Beirut and its Seven Families, Yussef Bin Ahmad Bin Ali Al Husseini says:

The seven families of Beirut are the families who bonded among each other and made the famous historical agreement with the governor of the Syrian Coast in 1351 to protect and defend the city of Beirut and its shores, and chase the invaders and stop their progress towards it.

=== Modern era ===
==== Capital of Lebanon ====
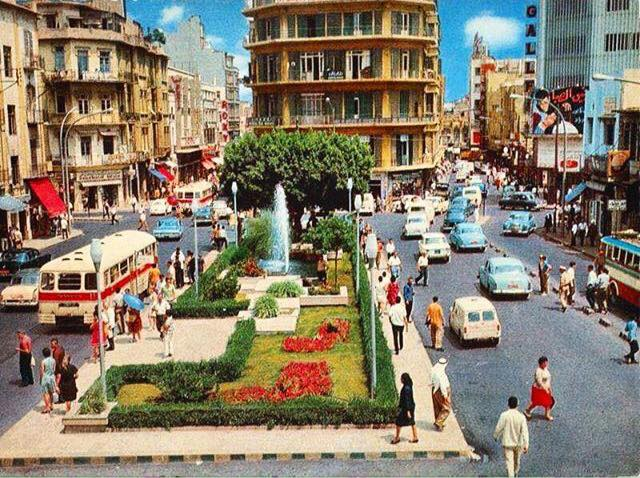
Debbas Square in Beirut, 1967

After World War I and the collapse of the Ottoman Empire, Beirut, along with the rest of Lebanon, was placed under the French Mandate. Under this mandate, the French pushed for an industrialization in order to display their presence. Throughout the mandate, inter-communal ties that existed throughout Bilad al-Sham persisted, yet heightened investment into cities meant Beirut increasingly tied into a new, developing nation-state identity. As a result of integrating Bilad al-Sham into an increasingly Europe-centered world economy, Beirut became a significant center for education and culture. Lebanon achieved independence in 1943, and Beirut became the capital city. The city remained a regional intellectual capital, becoming a major tourist destination and a banking haven, especially for the Persian Gulf oil boom.

Beirut International Airport was opened on 23 April 1954. It was renamed Rafic Hariri International Airport in 2005 following his assassination. Beirut serves as the location of Lebanon's sole commercial airport and its main gateway for flights.

This era of relative prosperity ended in 1975 when the Lebanese Civil War broke out throughout the country. During most of the war, Beirut was divided between the Muslim west part and the Christian east. The downtown area, previously the home of much of the city's commercial and cultural activity, became a no man's land known as the Green Line. Many inhabitants fled to other countries. About 60,000 people died in the first two years of the war (1975–1976), and much of the city was devastated. A particularly destructive period was the 1978 Syrian siege of Achrafiyeh, the main Christian district of Beirut. Syrian troops relentlessly shelled the eastern quarter of the city, but Christian militias defeated multiple attempts by Syria's elite forces to capture the strategic area in a three-month campaign later known as the Hundred Days' War.

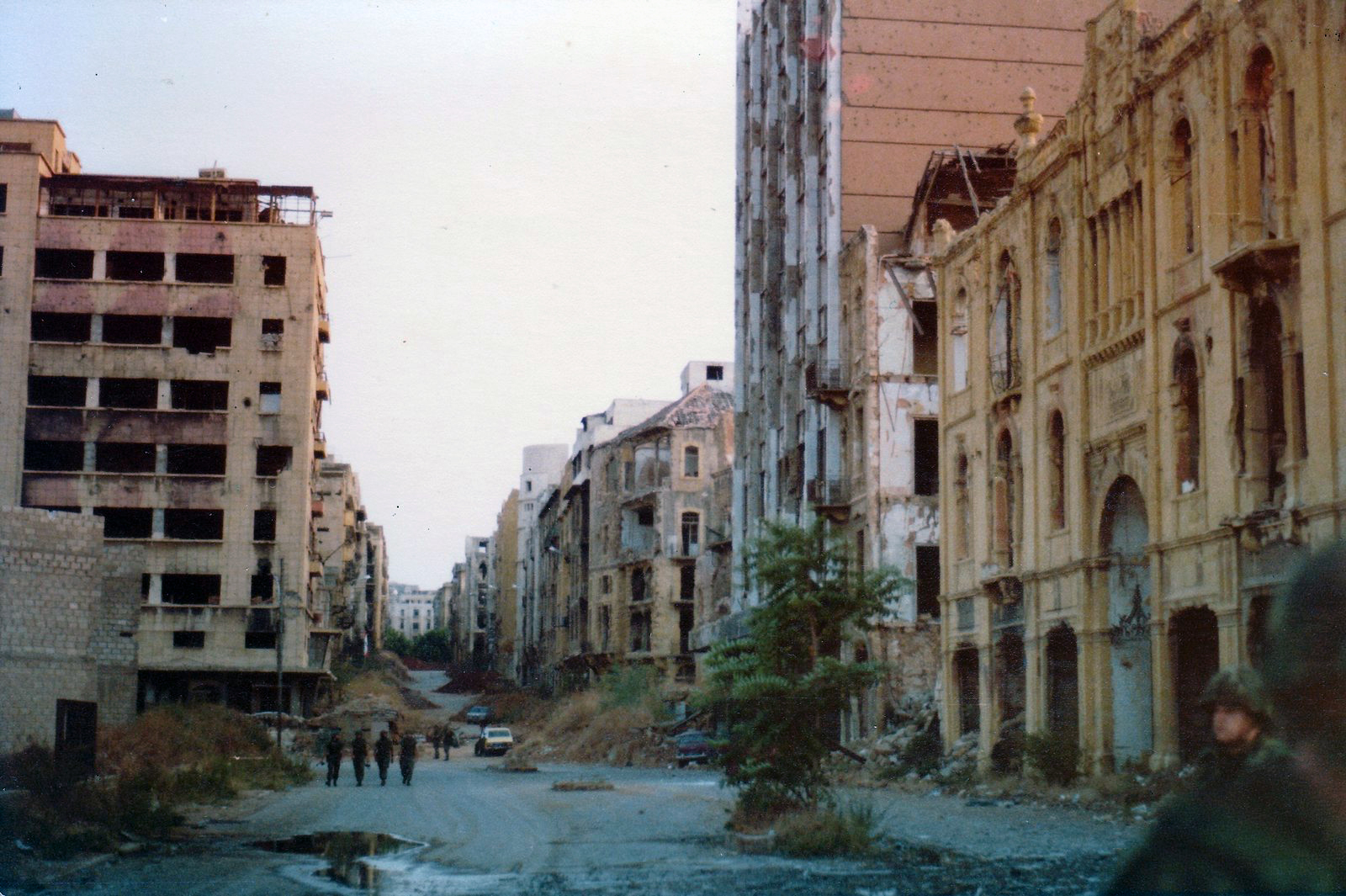
Green Line, Beirut, 1982

Another destructive chapter was the 1982 Lebanon War, during which most of West Beirut was under siege by Israeli troops. In 1983, French and US barracks were bombed, killing 241 American servicemen, 58 French servicemen, six civilians and the two suicide bombers.

Between 1989 and 1990 parts of East Beirut were destroyed in fighting between Lebanese army units loyal to General Aoun and Samir Geagea's Maronite Christian Lebanese Forces with the Syrian Armed Forces-backed Elias Hrawi and Salim Al-Huss Lebanese army forces.

Since the end of the war in 1990, the people of Lebanon have been rebuilding Beirut, whose urban agglomeration was mainly constituted during war time through an anarchic urban development stretching along the littoral corridor and its nearby heights. By the start of the 2006 Israel-Lebanon conflict the city had somewhat regained its status as a tourist, cultural and intellectual centre in the Middle East and as a centre for commerce, fashion, and media. The reconstruction of downtown Beirut has been largely driven by Solidere, a development company established in 1994 by Prime Minister Rafic Hariri. The city has hosted both the Asian Club Basketball Championship and the Asian Football Cup, and has hosted the Miss Europe pageant nine times: 1960–1964, 1999, 2001–2002, and 2016.

Rafic Hariri was assassinated in 2005 near the Saint George Hotel in Beirut. A month later about one million people gathered for an opposition rally in Beirut. The Cedar Revolution was the largest rally in Lebanon's history at that time. The last Syrian troops withdrew from Beirut on 26 April 2005, and the two countries established diplomatic relations on 15 October 2008.

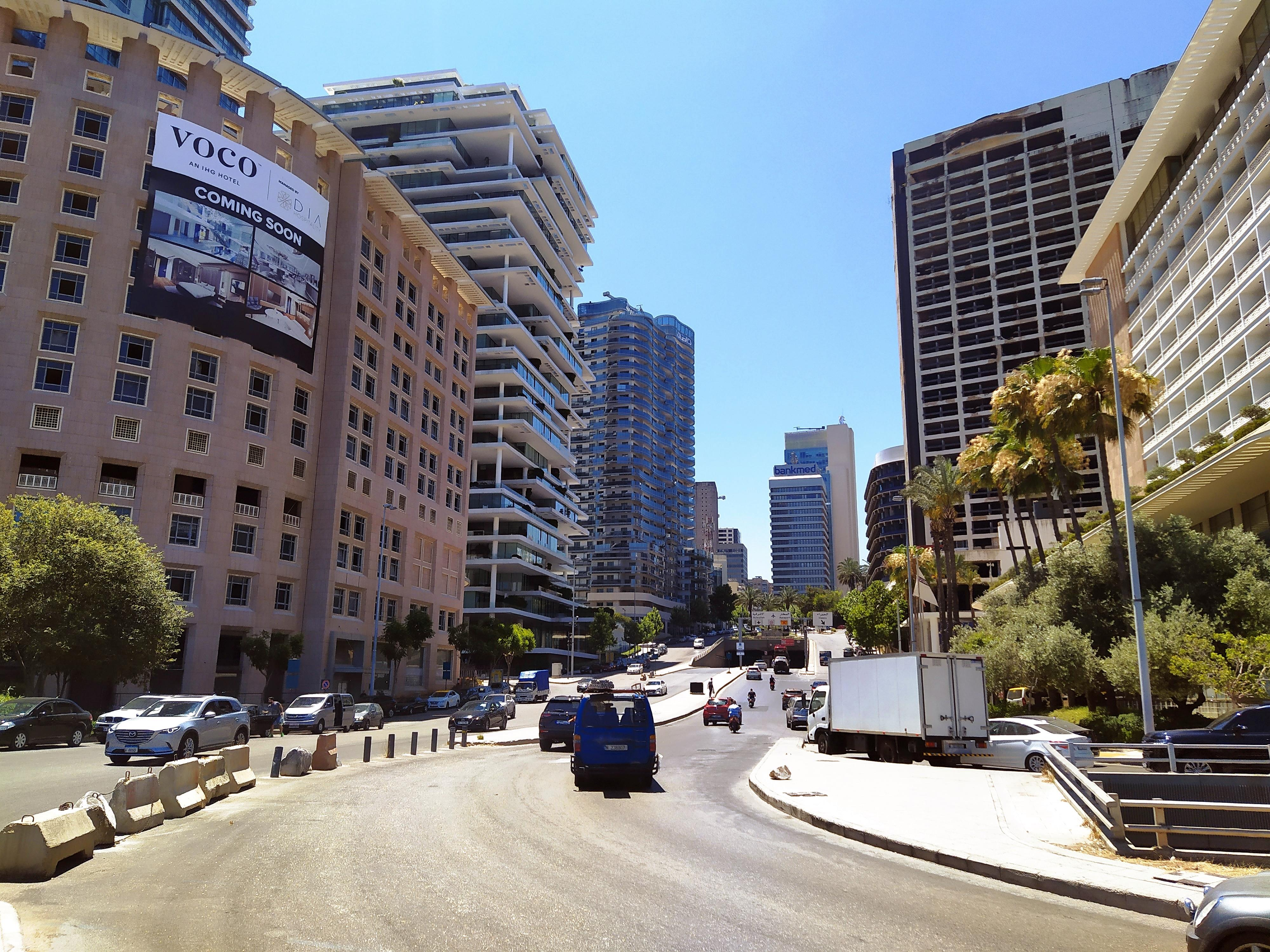
Street of Beirut Central District, 2023

During the 2006 Lebanon War, Israeli bombardment caused damage in many parts of Beirut, especially the predominantly Shiite southern suburbs of Beirut. On 12 July 2006, the "Operation Truthful Promise" carried out by Hezbollah ended with 8 Israeli deaths and 6 injuries. In response, the IDF targeted Hezbollah's main media outlets. There were then artillery raids against targets in southern Lebanon, and the Israeli cabinet held Beirut responsible for the attacks. Then on 13 July 2006 Israel began implementing a naval and air blockade over Lebanon; during this blockade Israel bombed the runways at Beirut International Airport and the major Beirut-Damascus highway in Eastern Lebanon.

In May 2008, after the government decided to disband Hezbollah's communications network (a decision it later rescinded), violent clashes broke out briefly between government allies and opposition forces, before control of the city was handed over to the Lebanese Army. After this a national dialogue conference was held in Doha at the invitation of the Prince of Qatar. The conference agreed to appoint a new president of Lebanon and to establish a new national government involving all the political adversaries. As a result of the Doha Agreement, the opposition's barricades were dismantled and so were the opposition's protest camps in Martyrs' Square. On 19 October 2012, a car bomb killed eight people in the Beirut's neighbourhood of Achrafiyeh, including Brigadier General Wissam al-Hassan, chief of the Intelligence Bureau of the Internal Security Forces. In addition, 78 others were wounded in the bombing. It was the largest attack in the capital since 2008. On 27 December 2013, a car bomb exploded in the Central District killing at least five people, including the former Lebanese ambassador to the U.S. Mohamad Chatah, and wounding 71 others.

In the 12 November 2015 Beirut bombings, two suicide bombers detonated explosives outside a mosque and inside a bakery, killing 43 people and injuring 200. The Islamic State of Iraq and the Levant immediately claimed responsibility for the attacks.

On 4 August 2020, a massive explosion in the Port of Beirut resulted in the death of at least 203 people (with an additional three missing) and the wounding of more than 6,500. Foreigners from at least 22 countries were among the casualties. Furthermore, at least 108 Bangladeshis were injured in the blasts, making them the most affected foreign community. The cause of the blast is believed to be from government-confiscated and stored ammonium nitrate. As many as 300,000 people have been left homeless by the explosion. Protesters in Lebanon called on the government on 8 August 2020 for the end of the alleged negligence that resulted in the 4 August explosion. On 10 August 2020, as a result of the protests, Prime Minister Hassan Diab announced his resignation. Weeks later, a huge fire erupted in an oil and tyre warehouse in the port's duty-free zone, on 10 September 2020.

On 8 April 2026, the International Committee of the Red Cross published a statement of outrage condemning Israeli strikes on densely populated civilian areas in Beirut and other locations in Lebanon.

== Geography ==
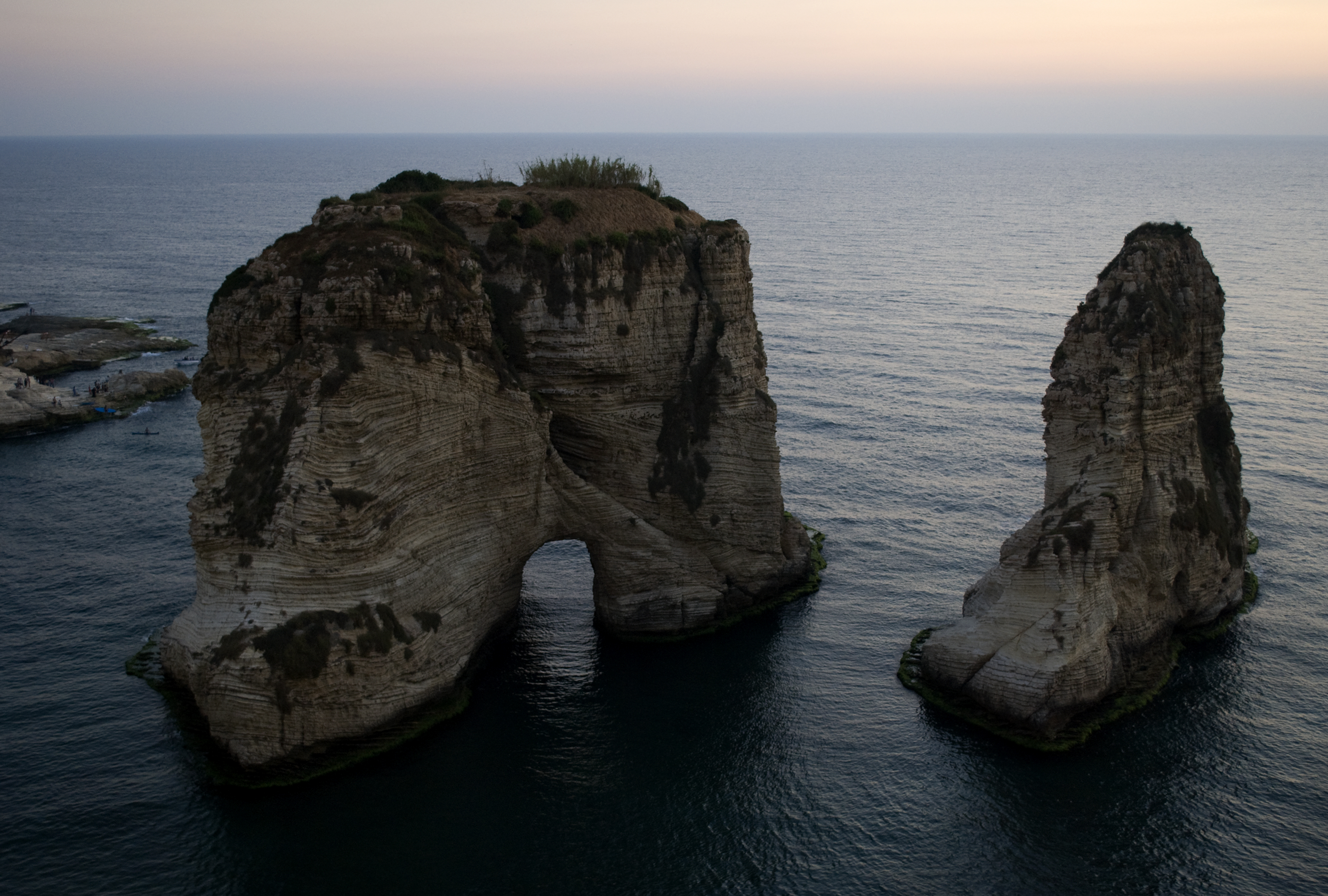
Pigeon Rock (Raouché)

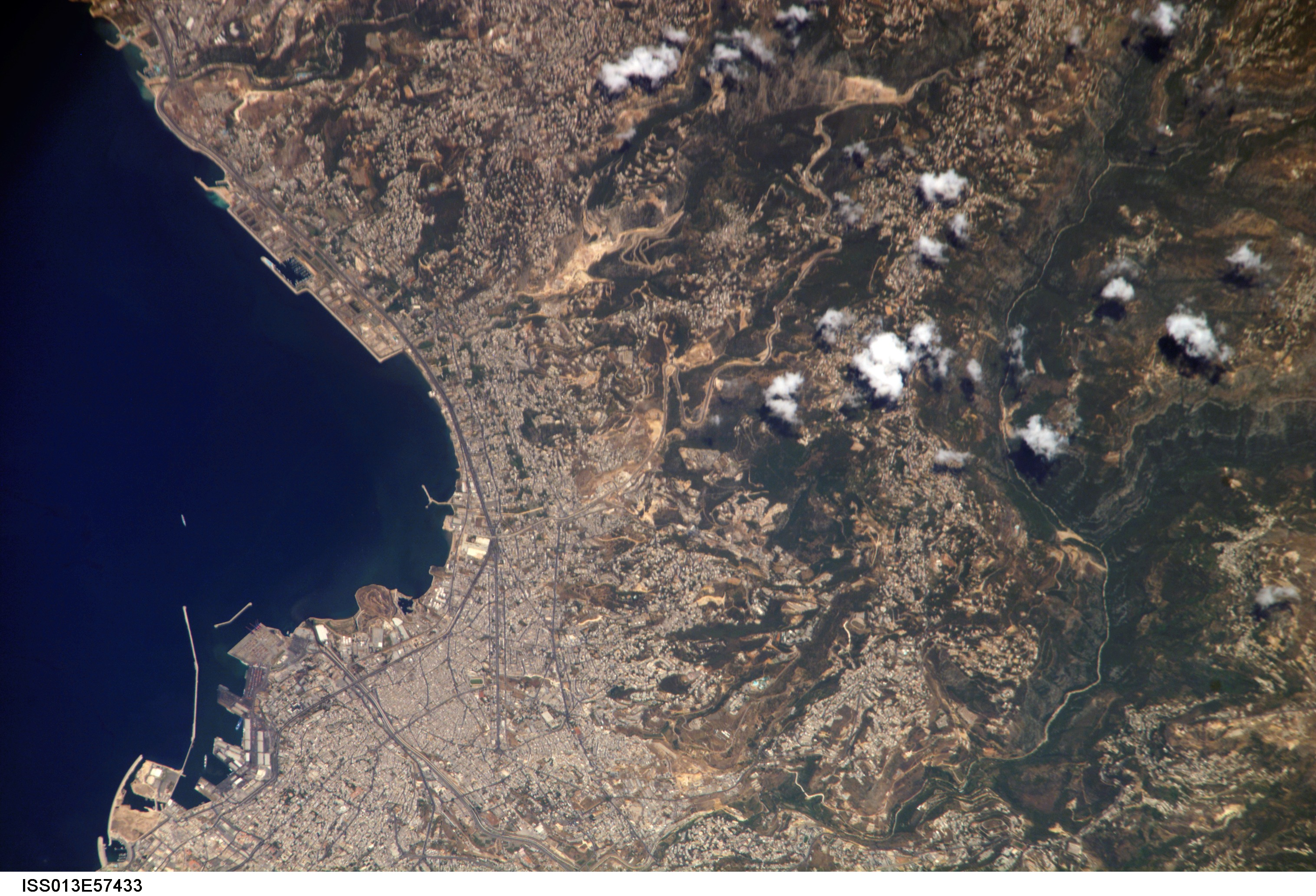
Beirut from the International Space Station

Beirut sits on a peninsula extending westward into the Mediterranean Sea. It is flanked by the Lebanon Mountains and has taken on a triangular shape, largely influenced by its situation between and atop two hills: Al-Ashrafieh and Al-Musaytibah. The Beirut Governorate occupies eighteen square kilometres (6.9 sq mi), and the city's metropolitan area 67 square kilometres (26 sq mi). The coast is rather diverse, with rocky beaches, sandy shores and cliffs situated beside one another.

=== Climate ===
Beirut has a hot-summer Mediterranean climate (Köppen: Csa, bordering on As, Trewartha: Csal) characterised by mild days and nights, as its coastal location allows temperatures to be moderated by the sea. Autumn and spring are warm, but short. Winter is mild and rainy; frost has never been recorded. Summer is prolonged, hot and humid. The prevailing wind during the afternoon and evening is from the west (onshore, blowing in from the Mediterranean); at night it reverses to offshore, blowing from the land out to sea.

The average annual rainfall is 825 millimetres (32.5 in), with the large majority of it falling from October to April. Much of the autumn and spring rain falls in heavy downpours on a limited number of days, but in winter it is spread more evenly over many days. Summer receives very little rainfall, if any. Snow is rare, except in the mountainous eastern suburbs, where snowfall occurs due to the region's high altitudes. Hail (which can often be heavy) occurs a few times per year, mostly during winter.

Climate data for Beirut International Airport
Month	Jan	Feb	Mar	Apr	May	Jun	Jul	Aug	Sep	Oct	Nov	Dec	Year
Record high °C (°F)	27.9 (82.2)	30.5 (86.9)	36.6 (97.9)	39.3 (102.7)	39.0 (102.2)	40.0 (104.0)	40.4 (104.7)	39.5 (103.1)	37.5 (99.5)	37.0 (98.6)	33.1 (91.6)	30.0 (86.0)	40.4 (104.7)
Mean daily maximum °C (°F)	17.4 (63.3)	17.5 (63.5)	19.6 (67.3)	22.6 (72.7)	25.4 (77.7)	27.9 (82.2)	30.0 (86.0)	30.7 (87.3)	29.8 (85.6)	27.5 (81.5)	23.2 (73.8)	19.4 (66.9)	24.3 (75.7)
Daily mean °C (°F)	14.0 (57.2)	14.0 (57.2)	16.0 (60.8)	18.7 (65.7)	21.7 (71.1)	24.9 (76.8)	27.1 (80.8)	27.8 (82.0)	26.8 (80.2)	24.1 (75.4)	19.5 (67.1)	15.8 (60.4)	20.9 (69.6)
Mean daily minimum °C (°F)	11.2 (52.2)	11.0 (51.8)	12.6 (54.7)	15.2 (59.4)	18.2 (64.8)	21.6 (70.9)	24.0 (75.2)	24.8 (76.6)	23.7 (74.7)	21.0 (69.8)	16.3 (61.3)	12.9 (55.2)	17.7 (63.9)
Record low °C (°F)	0.8 (33.4)	3.0 (37.4)	0.2 (32.4)	7.6 (45.7)	10.0 (50.0)	15.0 (59.0)	18.0 (64.4)	19.0 (66.2)	17.0 (62.6)	11.1 (52.0)	7.0 (44.6)	4.6 (40.3)	0.8 (33.4)
Average precipitation mm (inches)	154 (6.1)	127 (5.0)	84 (3.3)	31 (1.2)	11 (0.4)	1 (0.0)	0.3 (0.01)	0 (0)	5 (0.2)	60 (2.4)	115 (4.5)	141 (5.6)	730 (28.7)
Average rainy days	12	10	8	5	2	2	0.04	0.1	1	4	7	11	62
Average relative humidity (%)	64	64	64	66	70	71	72	71	65	62	60	63	66
Average dew point °C (°F)	7 (45)	8 (46)	9 (48)	12 (54)	16 (61)	19 (66)	22 (72)	22 (72)	19 (66)	16 (61)	11 (52)	8 (46)	14 (57)
Mean monthly sunshine hours	131	143	191	243	310	348	360	334	288	245	200	147	2,940
Source 1: Danish Meteorological Institute (sun 1931–1960)
Source 2: Time and Date (dewpoints, between 1985-2015)

Beirut mean sea temperature
Jan	Feb	Mar	Apr	May	Jun	Jul	Aug	Sep	Oct	Nov	Dec
18.5 °C (65.3 °F)	17.5 °C (63.5 °F)	17.5 °C (63.5 °F)	18.5 °C (65.3 °F)	21.3 °C (70.3 °F)	24.9 °C (76.8 °F)	27.5 °C (81.5 °F)	28.5 °C (83.3 °F)	28.1 °C (82.6 °F)	26.0 °C (78.8 °F)	22.6 °C (72.7 °F)	20.1 °C (68.2 °F)

=== Environmental issues ===
Lebanon, especially Beirut and its suburbs, suffered a massive garbage crisis, mainly from July 2015 up to March 2016. The issue began when authorities shut down the main landfill site originally used for Beirut's garbage south-east of the city and failed to provide any alternative solutions for months. As a result, garbage mounted in the streets in Greater Beirut and caused protests to erupt, which sometimes invoked police action. This problem was commonly blamed on the country's political situation. This garbage crisis birthed a movement called "You Stink" which was directed at the country's politicians. In March 2016, the government came up with a so-called temporary solution to establish two new landfills East and South of the city to store the garbage, while several municipalities across the country, in an unprecedented move, began recycling and managing waste more efficiently, building waste-management facilities and relying on themselves rather than the central government. Moreover, Beirut has a lack of green areas with just two main public gardens (sanayeh and horch Beirut). In fact, concrete roofs cover 80% of the capital area.

=== Quarters and sectors ===
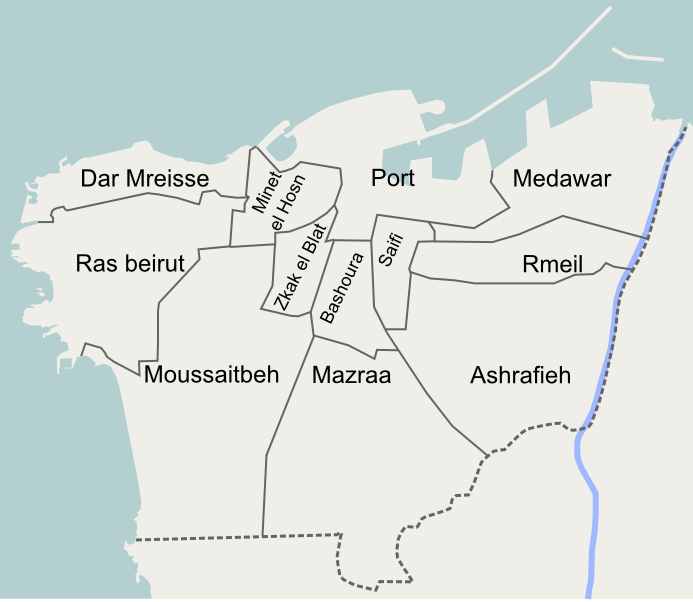
Map of the 12 quarters of Beirut

Beirut is divided into 12 quarters (quartiers):

- Achrafieh
- Dar Mreisse
- Bachoura
- Mazraa (with the neighbourhood Badaro)
- Medawar (with the neighbourhood Mar Mikhaël)
- Minet El Hosn
- Moussaitbeh (with Ramlet al-Baida)
- Port
- Ras Beirut
- Rmeil
- Saifi
- Zuqaq al-Blat

These quarters are divided into 59 sectors (secteurs).

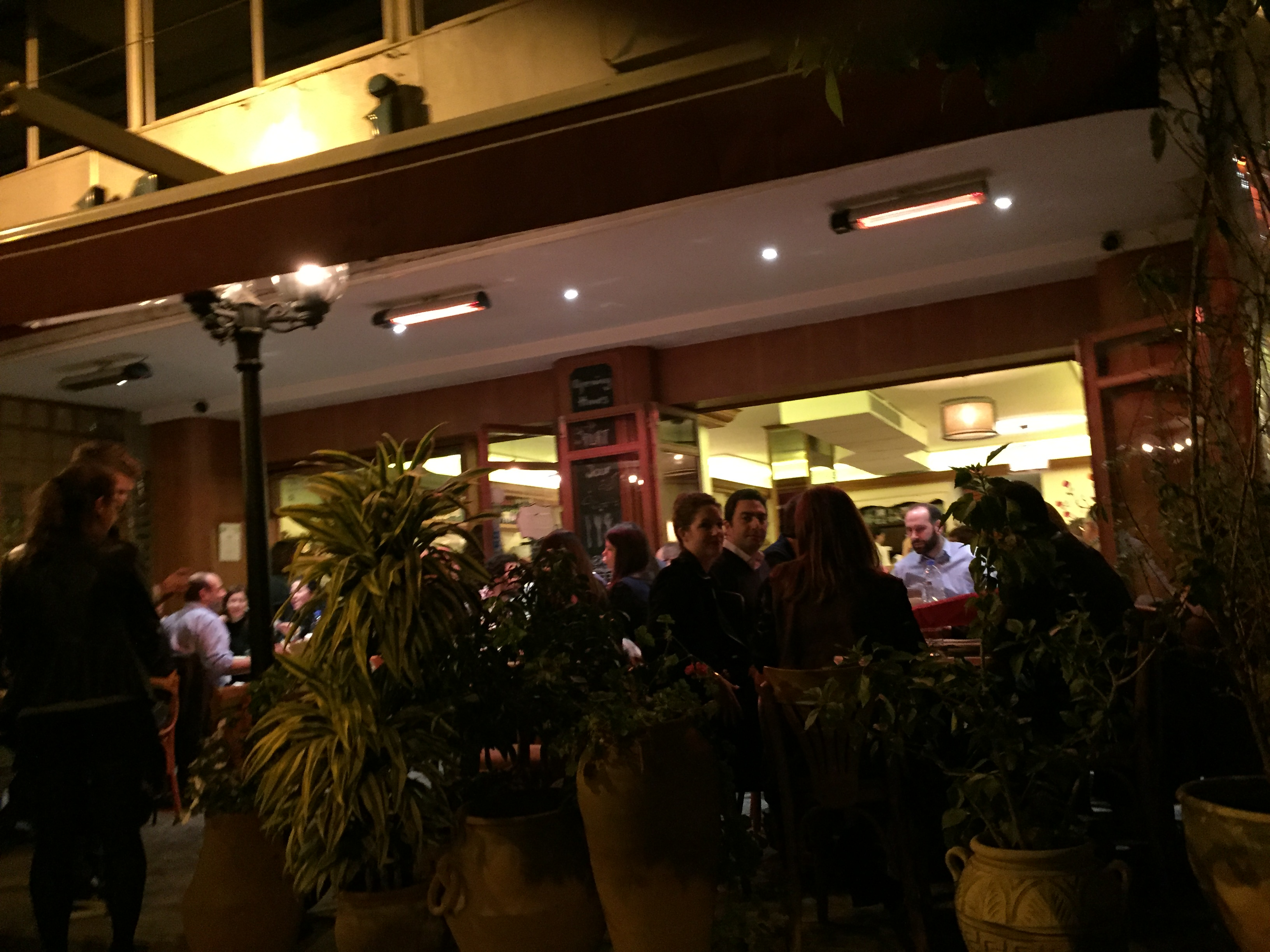
Nightlife scene in Badaro

Badaro is a bohemian-styled neighbourhood. It is located within the green district of Beirut (secteur du parc), which also include the Beirut Hippodrome, the Beirut Pine Forest, and the French ambassador's Pine Residence. The neighbourhood is known for art, nightlife, and drinking.

Two of the twelve official Palestinian refugee camps in Lebanon are located in the southern suburbs of Beirut: Bourj el-Barajneh and Shatila. There is also one within its municipal boundaries: Mar Elias.

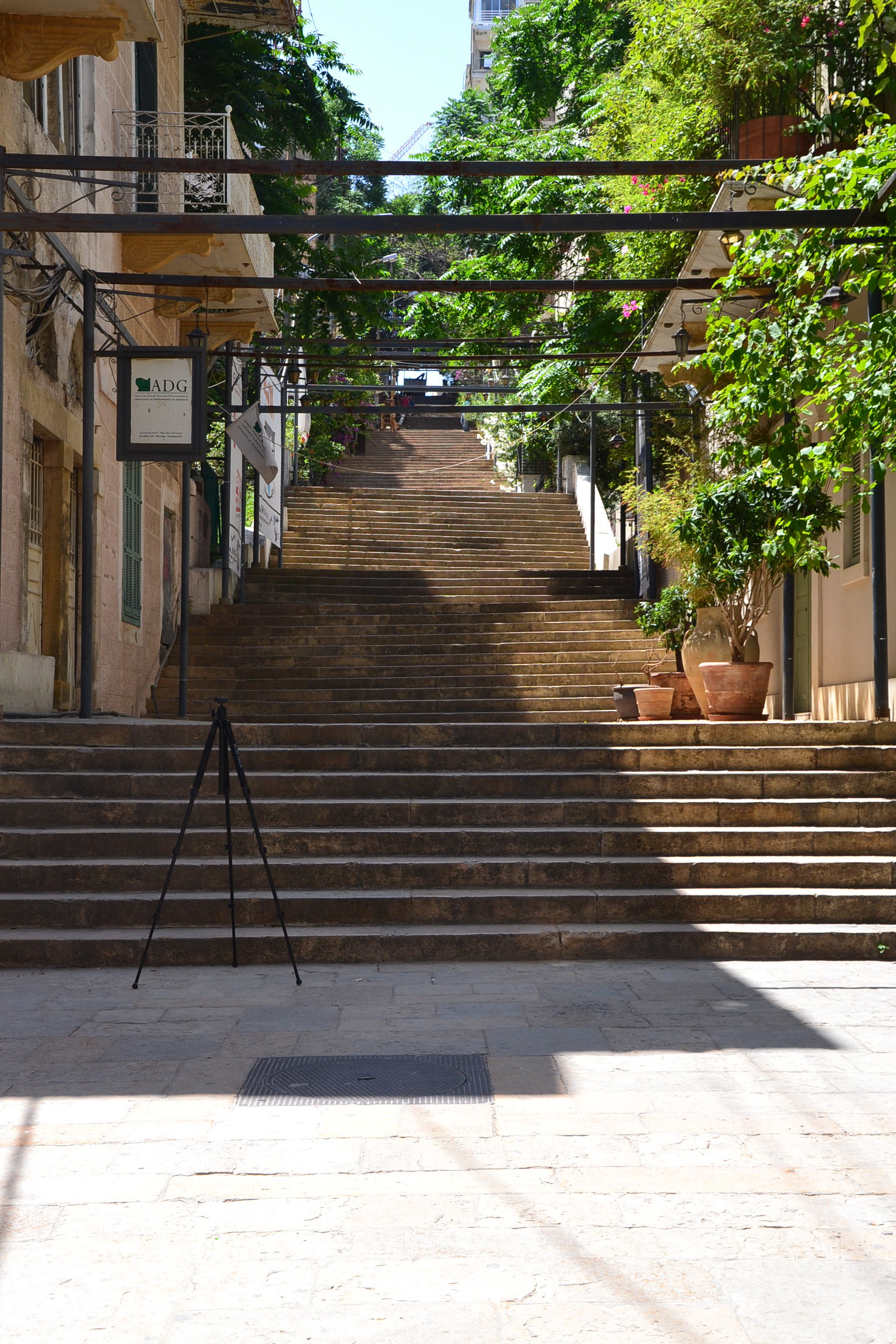
Saint Nicholas staircase in Ashrafieh

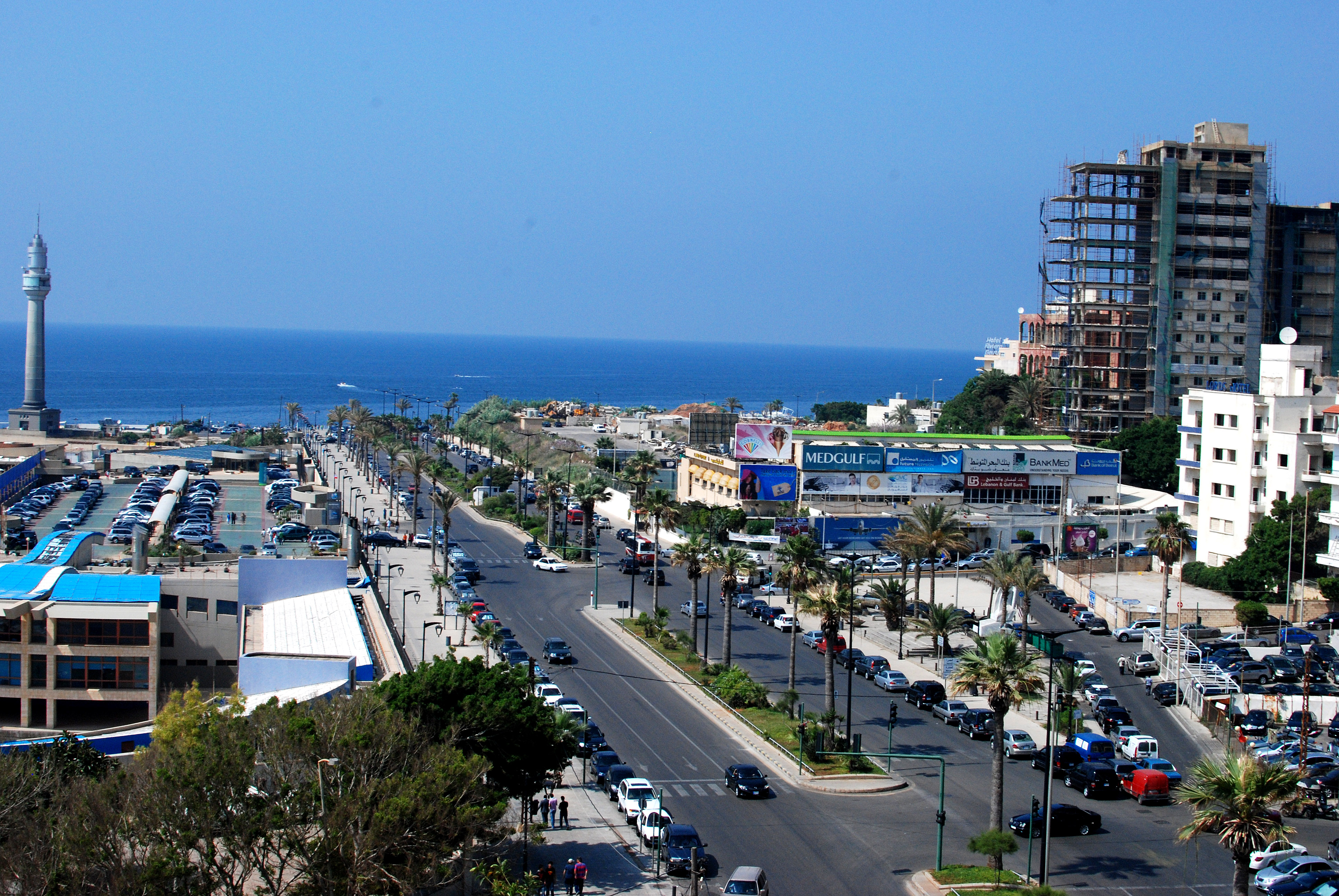
Ras Beirut and the Mediterranean Sea

Southern suburban districts include Chiyah, Ghobeiry (Bir Hassan, Jnah and Ouzai are part of the Ghobeiry municipality), Haret Hreik, Burj al Barajneh, Laylake-Mreijeh, Hay al Sillum and Hadath. Eastern suburbs include Burj Hammoud, Sin el Fil, Dekwane and Mkalles. Hazmiyeh is also considered as an eastern suburb with its close proximity to the capital. Of the 15 unregistered or unofficial refugee camps, Sabra, which lies adjacent to Shatila, is also located in southern Beirut and was the scene of a massacre during the civil war.

People in Lebanon often use different names for the same geographic locations, and few people rely on official, government-provided street numbers. Instead, historic and commercial landmarks are more commonly used.

== Demographics ==
No population census has been taken in Lebanon since 1932, but estimates of Beirut's population range from as low as 938,940 through 1,303,129 to as high as 2,200,000 as part of Greater Beirut.

=== Religion ===
Religion in Beirut (2022)
Religion	Percent
Sunni Islam	43.82%
Shia Islam	15.49%
Christian	40.00%
Others	0.69%

Confessional breakdown of registered voters in Beirut (2022)
1. Sunni Islam (43.8%)
2. Shia Islam (15.5%)
3. Armenian Orthodox (8.72%)
4. Greek Orthodox (8.87%)
5. Maronite Catholic (7.62%)
6. Melkite Greek Catholic (6.11%)
7. Armenian Catholic (3.01%)
8. Other Christian (5.68%)
9. Other (0.69%)

Beirut is one of the most cosmopolitan and religiously diverse cities of Lebanon and all of the Middle East. Before the civil war the neighbourhoods of Beirut were fairly heterogeneous, but they became largely segregated by religion since the conflict. East Beirut has a mainly Christian population with a small Muslim minority, whilst West Beirut has a Sunni Muslim majority with small minorities of Shia, Christians and Druze. Since the end of the civil war, East and West Beirut have begun to see an increase in Muslims and Christians moving into each half. Christians comprise 40% of Beirut's population, Muslims 59%, Druze 1%, and others 1%.

Saint George Maronite Cathedral and Mohammad Al-Amin Mosque side by side in Downtown Beirut

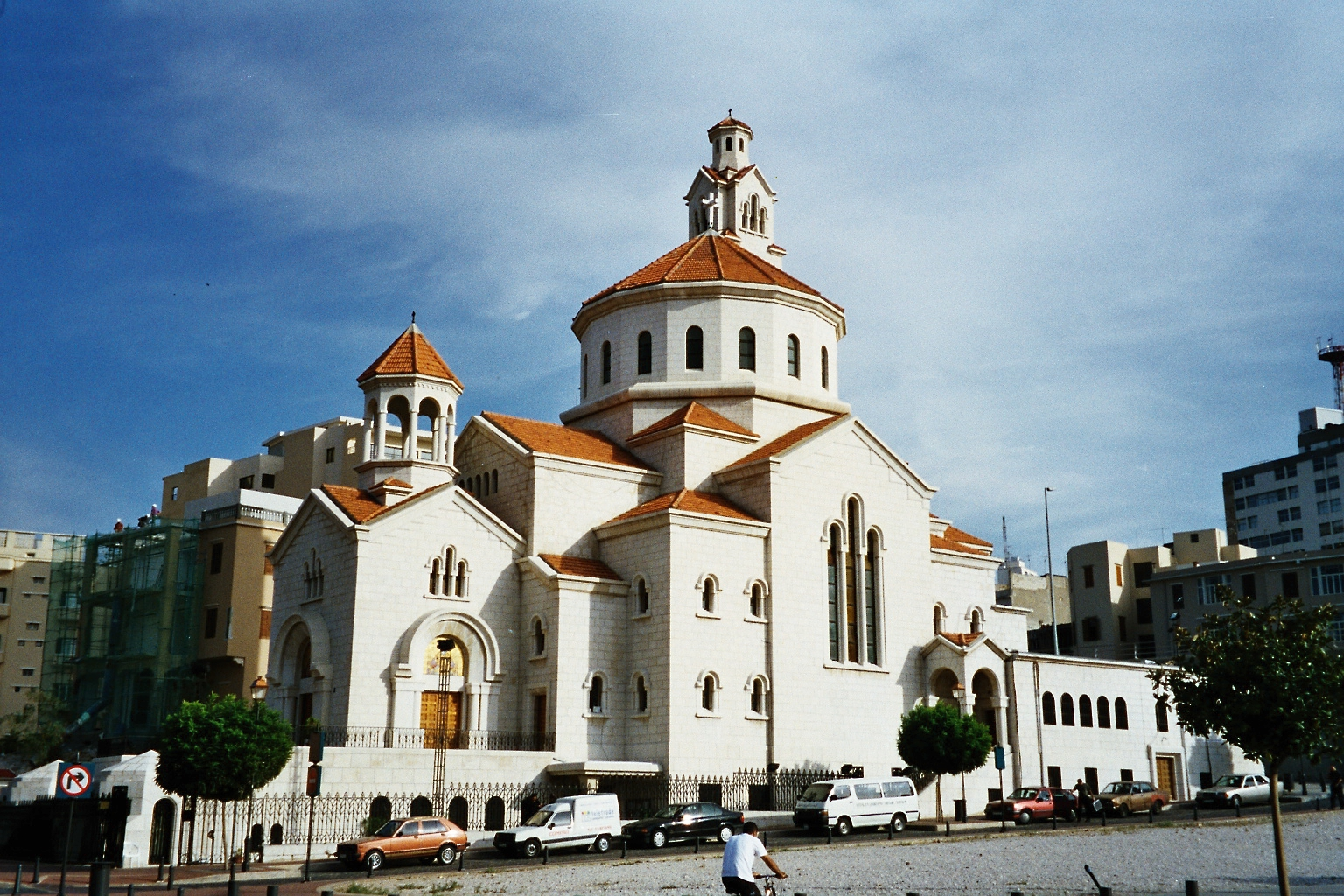
Cathedral of St Elias and St Gregory the Illuminator in Downtown Beirut

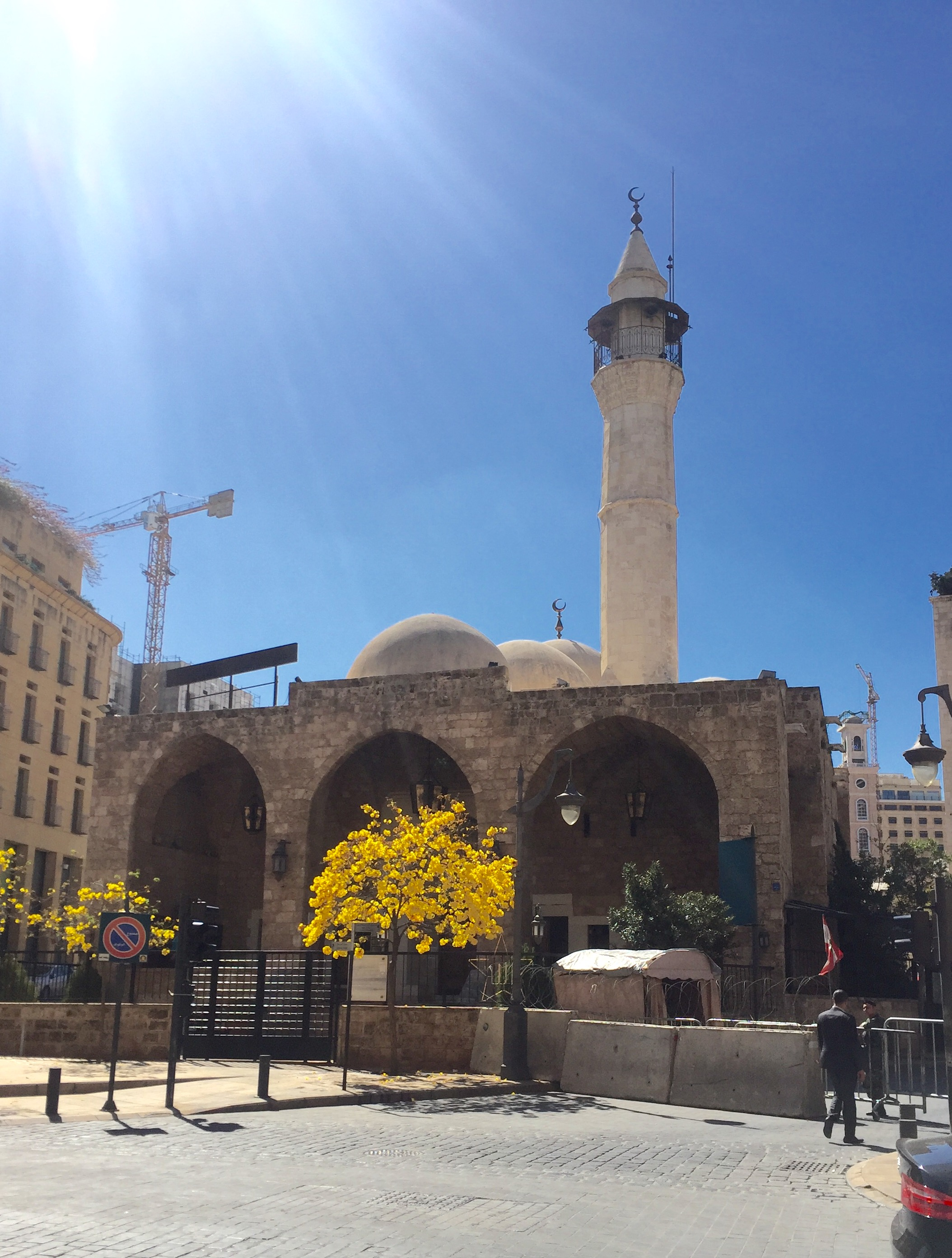
Emir Assaf Mosque, Beirut Central District

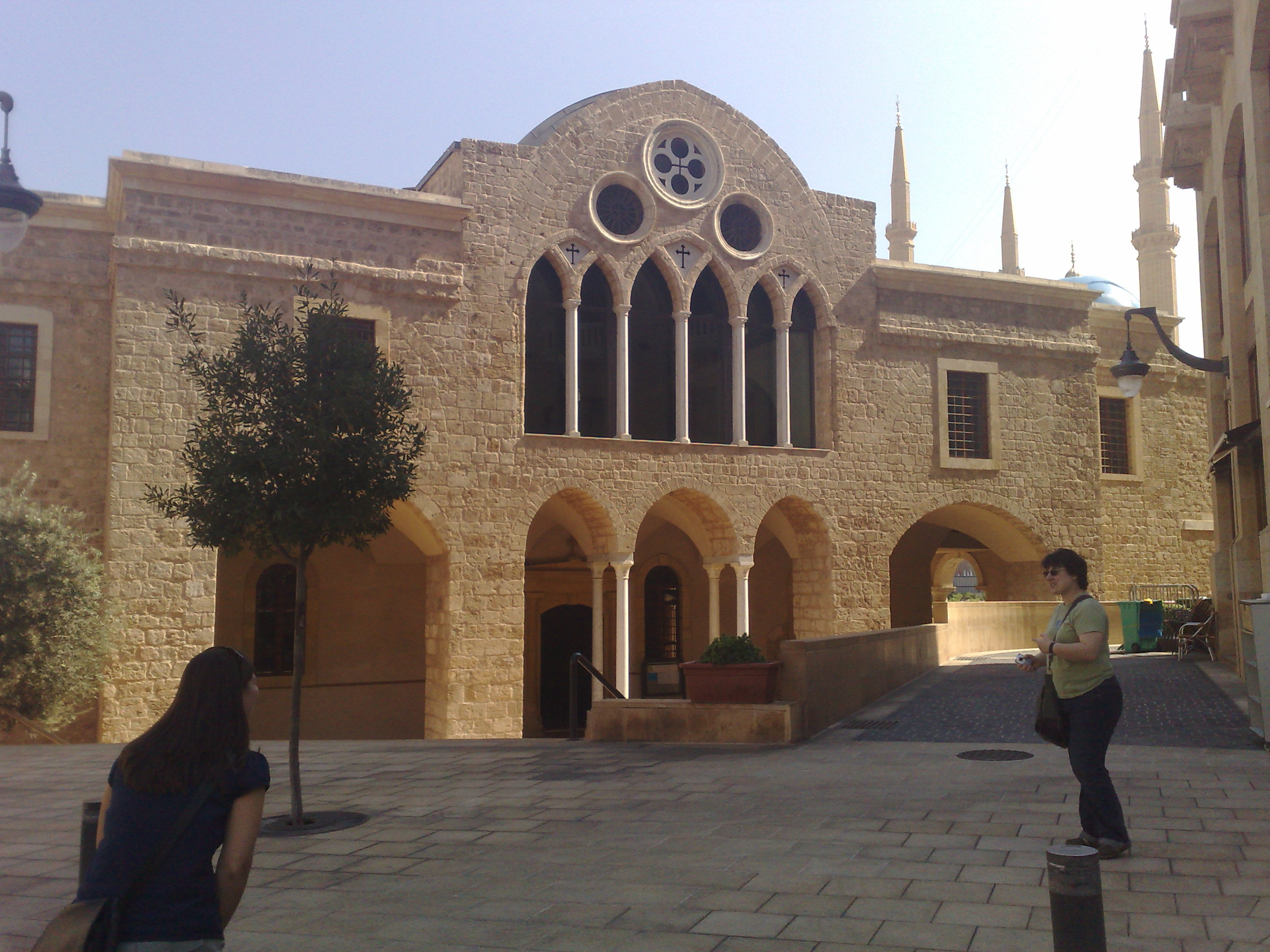
Cathedral of St. George's Greek Orthodox in Downtown Beirut

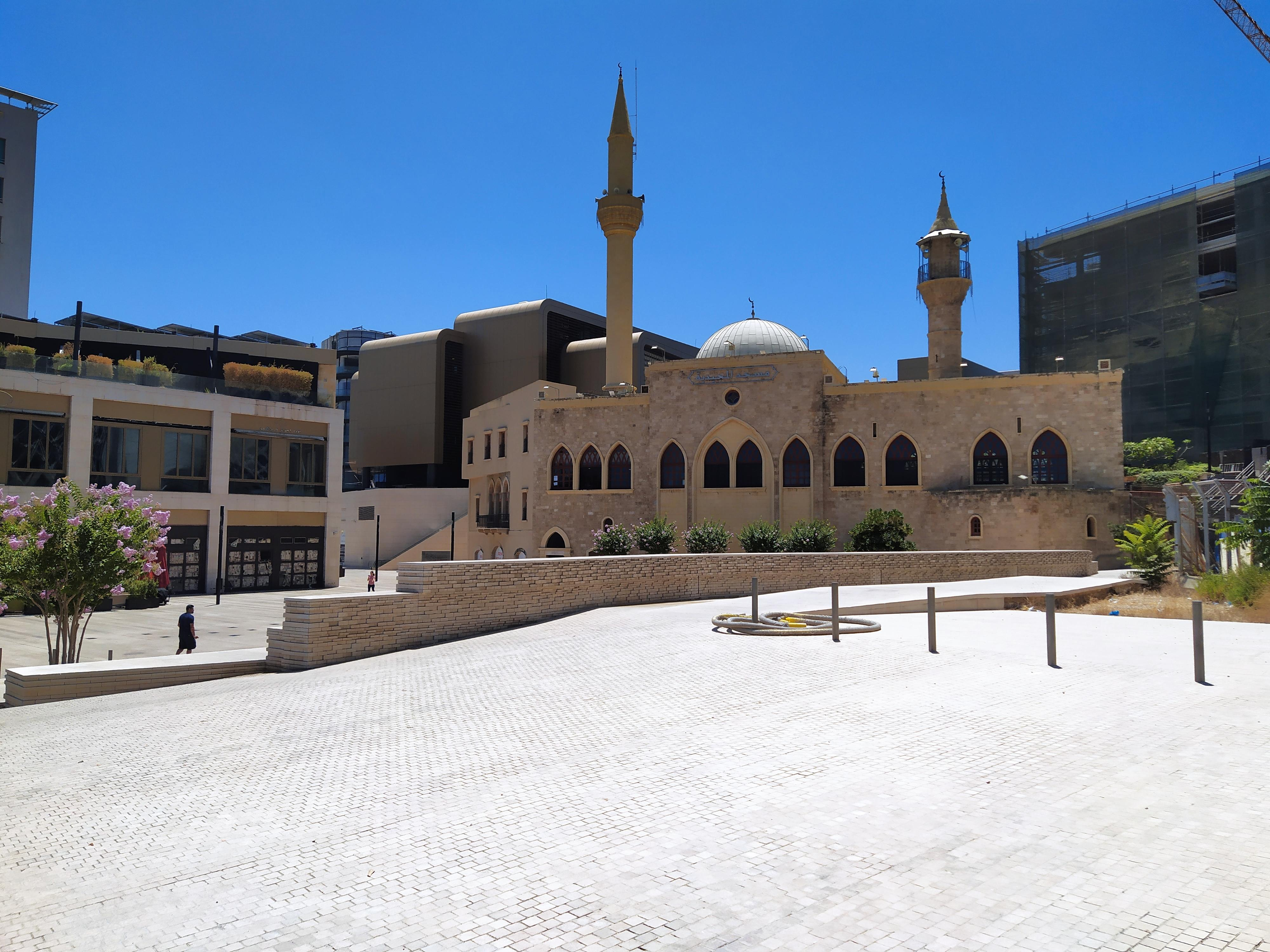
Al-Majidiyyeh Mosque, Beirut Souks

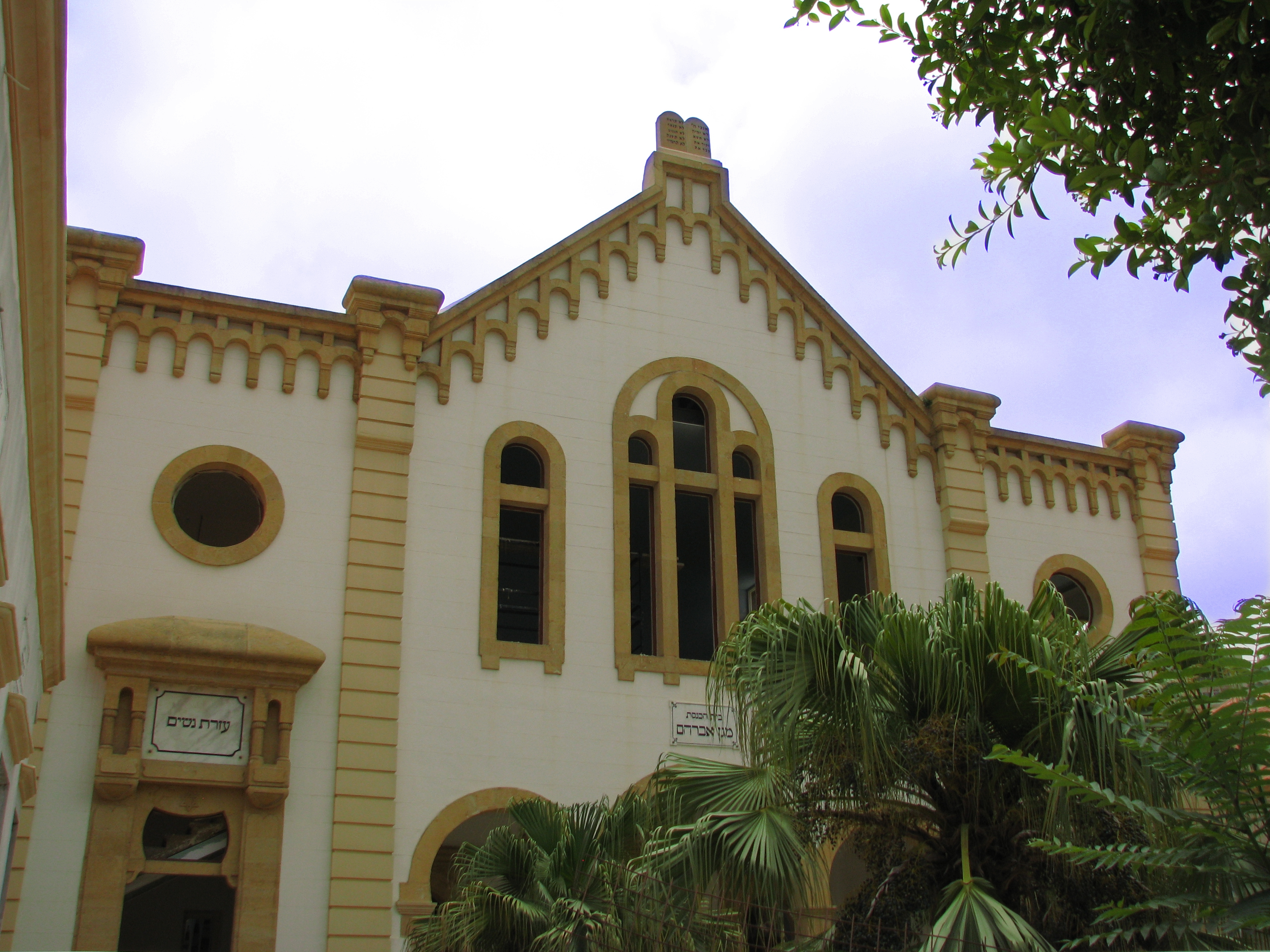
Maghen Abraham Synagogue in Downtown Beirut

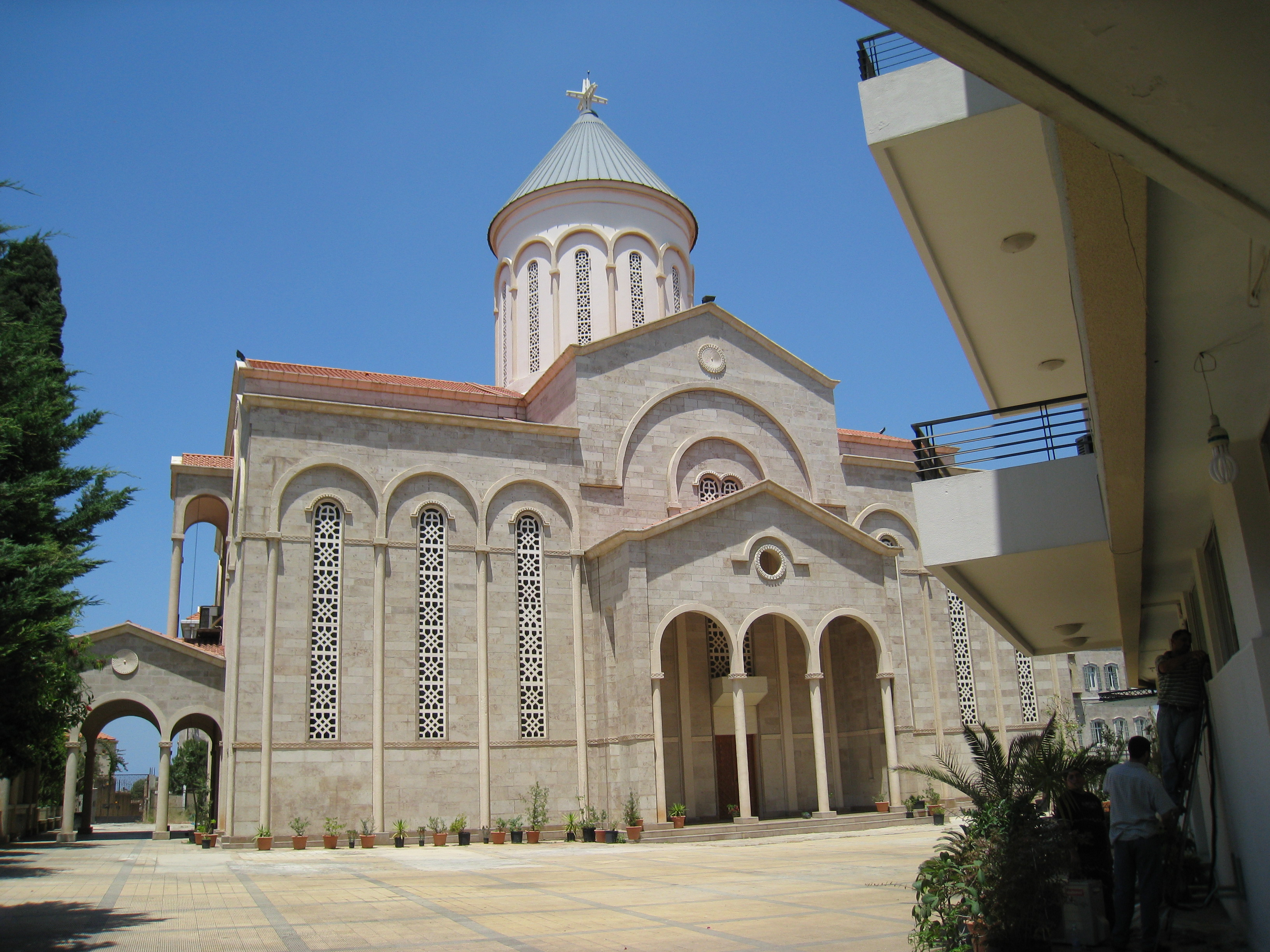
Surb Nshan Cathedral on the Serail Hill

Family matters such as marriage, divorce and inheritance are still handled by the religious authorities representing a person's faith (the Ottoman "millet" system). Calls for civil marriage are unanimously rejected by the religious authorities, but civil marriages held in another country are recognised by Lebanese civil authorities.

=== Languages ===
Lebanon does not hold a census survey; researchers at the American University of Beirut have found that trilingualism - between Lebanese Arabic, French and English - is common and normal among Beirut residents. The use of all three languages crosses between the city's different sects and geography, and are a common occurrence in both the more cosmopolitan and the more conservative neighbourhoods. The research found that French or English is disproportionately heard nearby Francophone or Anglophone, respectively, educational institutions. Some minorities in Beirut also speak Armenian, Aramaic, and Amharic.

== Beirut Central District ==
The Beirut Central District (BCD) or Centre Ville is the name given to Beirut's historical and geographical core by "Solidere", the "vibrant financial, commercial, and administrative hub of the country". It is an area thousands of years old, traditionally a focus of business, finance, culture and leisure. Its reconstruction constitutes one of the most ambitious contemporary urban developments. Due to the devastation incurred on the city centre from the Lebanese Civil War, the Beirut Central District underwent a thorough reconstruction and development plan that gave it back its cultural and economic position in the region. Ever since, Beirut Central District has evolved into an integrated business and commercial environment and the focus of the financial activity in the region. That evolution was accompanied with the relocation of international organisations, reoccupation of civic and government buildings, expansion of financial activities, and establishment of regional headquarters and global firms in the city centre.

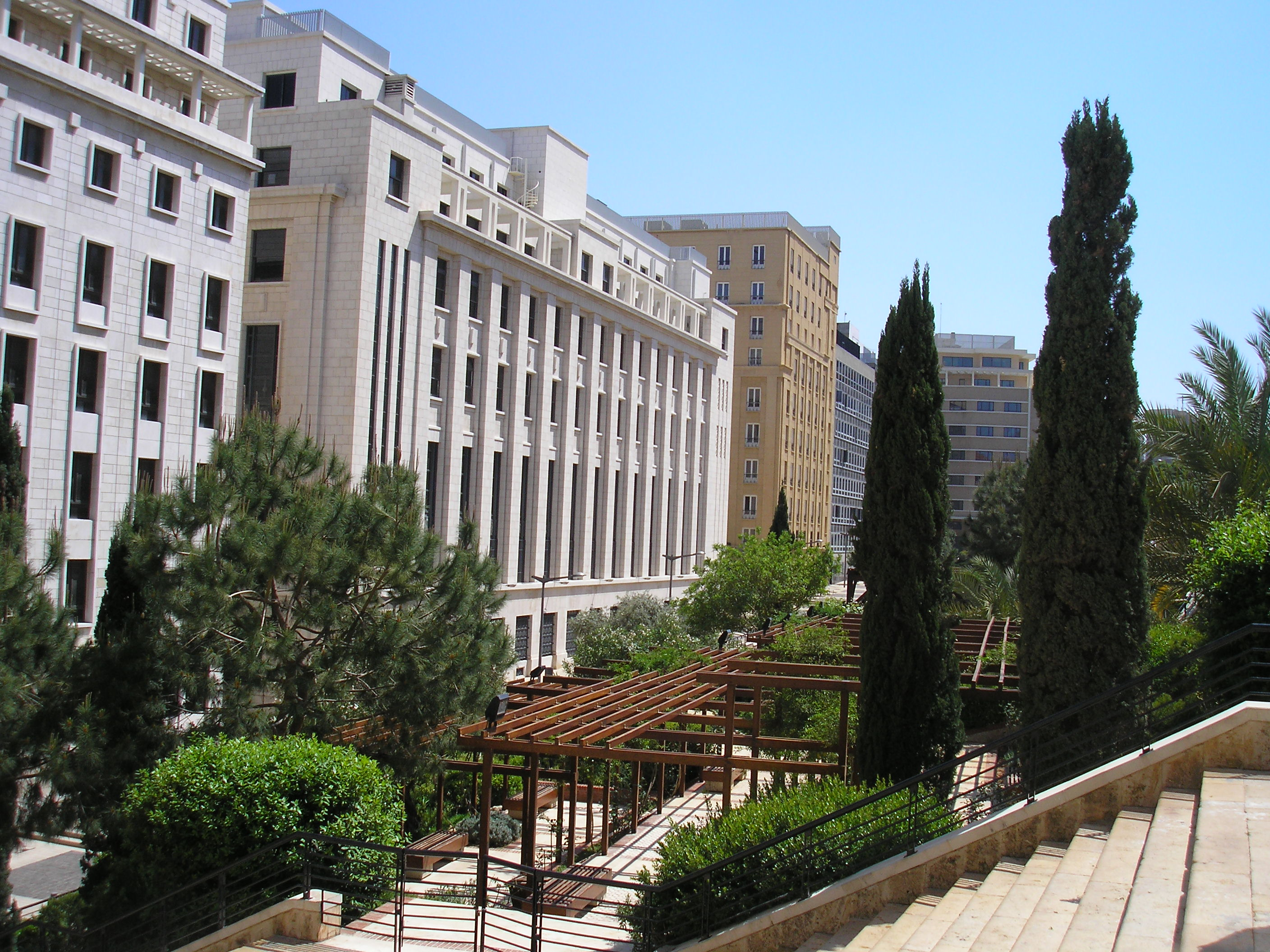
Roman baths park in Downtown Beirut

Assessment of the demand for build-up space in the BCD has been done in reference to a number of macro-economic, demographic, and urban planning considerations at a time of marked need for new activity poles in the city, such as Souks, financial, cultural and recreational centres. The district's total area is 4,690,000 square metres (50,482,740 square feet), the majority of which is dedicated to residential space (1,924,000 square metres or 20,709,764 square feet). The Beirut Central District contains over 60 gardens, squares and open spaces. These spaces comprise landscaped streets, gardens, historical squares, pedestrian areas and sea promenades thus totalling to an area of 96 acres (39 ha) of open spaces.

The central district is Lebanon's prime location for shopping, entertainment, and dining. There are over 100 cafes, restaurants, pubs and nightclubs open in the Beirut Central District, and over 350 retail outlets distributed along its streets and quarters. Beirut Souks alone are home to over 200 stores and a handful of restaurants and cafes. Beirut Souks are the Central District's old medieval market, recently renovated along with the original Hellenistic street grid that characterised the old souks and the area's historical landmarks along long vaulted shopping alleys and arcades. Solidere, the company responsible for the reconstruction and renovation of the district, organises music and entertainment events all throughout the year like the Beirut Marathon, Fête de la Musique, Beirut Jazz Festival.

However, the means of urban development in this particular area of the city was subject to much criticism and controversy. Rafic Hariri, who would later become prime minister, was the majority stakeholder of the company, which raises concerns of conflict of interest in the context of a public-private partnership. Many of the expropriations that have made the project possible have been made at undervalued land rates, and partly paid in company share. Strict urbanisation laws were put in order to oblige people to sell and not renovate themselves. Today, Solidere acts as a de facto municipality, thus this quarter of the city is effectively privatised. It is for example forbidden to ride bikes on Zeituna Bay, a marina where many restaurants are located, and these laws are enforced by private security guards not national or municipal police.

The project was also criticised for destroying some of the city's architectural and cultural heritage. Among the hundreds of destroyed buildings were "the last Ottoman and medieval remains in Beirut" wrote American University of Beirut professor Nabil Beyhum in the Journal The Beirut Review in 1992. Much of the damage had been done through unapproved demolitions in the 1980s and early 1990s, bringing down "some of the capital's most significant buildings and structures," wrote UCLA professor Saree Makdisi in the journal, Critical Inquiry, in 1997. Moreover, many of the traditional privately owned shops in the Beirut Downtown were replaced by luxury outlets and high-end restaurants that only few people could afford. And most of public spaces promised by Solidere since the start of the reconstruction, such as "The Garden of Forgiveness", a central park, and an archaeological museum, remain unfinished until today, putting into question the actual benefit of the project to the population.

The actual success of the project has recently been in doubt, given that large quarters of the BCD are today empty, due to strong military presence, the Nejmeh Square where the parliament is located is most frequently completely deserted, and the businesses located there have mostly moved.

== Economy ==
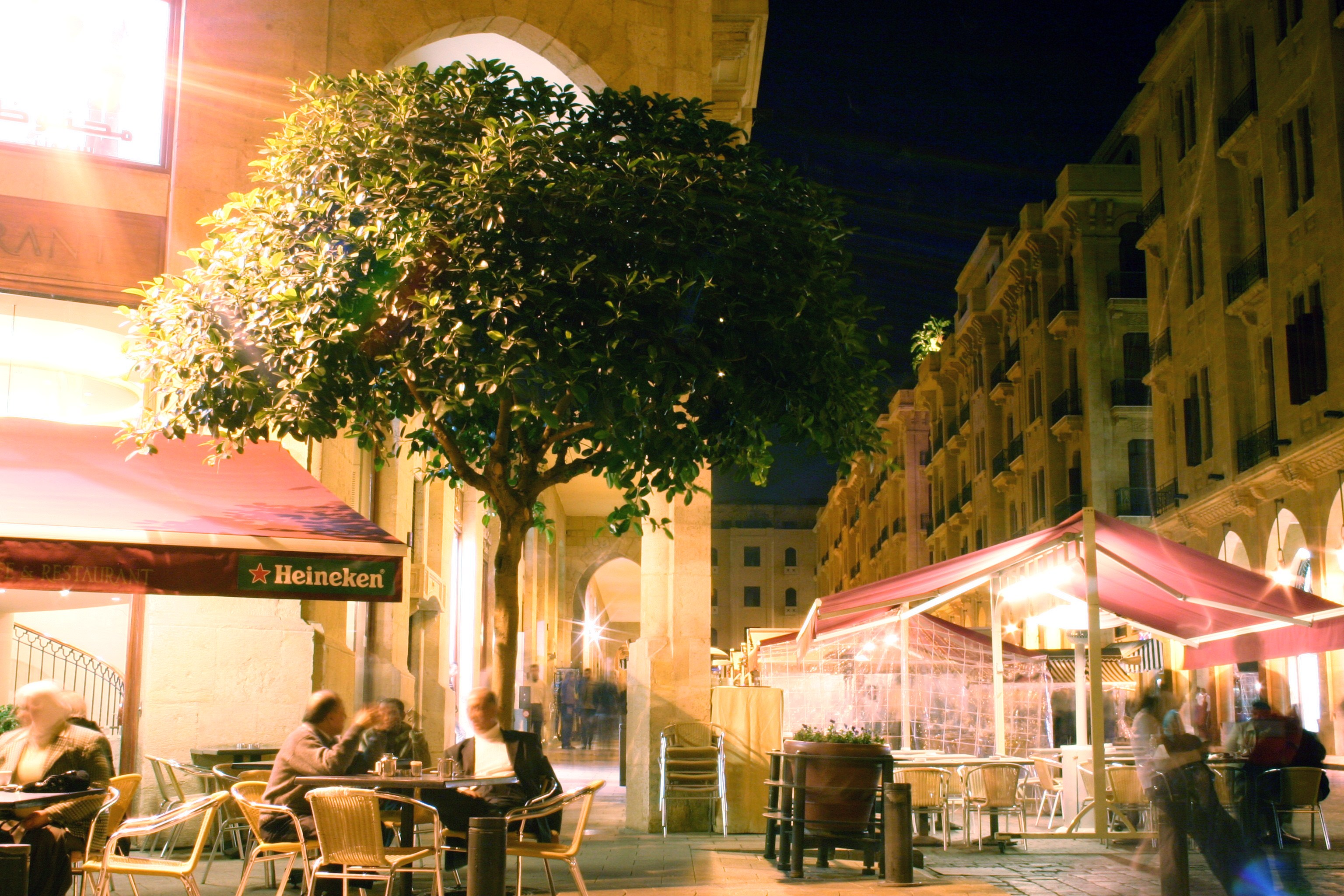
Cafés in downtown Beirut

Beirut's economy is service-oriented with the main growth sectors being banking and tourism.

In an area dominated by authoritarian or militarist regimes, the Lebanese capital was generally regarded as a haven of libertarianism, though a precarious one, as the Lebanese Civil War (1975–1990) and subsequent conflicts significantly altered the political landscape. With its seaport and airport—coupled with Lebanon's free economic and foreign exchange system, solid gold-backed currency, banking-secrecy law, and favourable interest rates—Beirut became an established banking centre for Arab wealth, much of which was invested in construction, commercial enterprise, and industry (mostly the manufacture of textiles and shoes, food processing, and printing). The economy of Beirut is diverse, including publishing, banking, trade and various industries. During that period, Beirut was the region's financial services centre. At the onset of the oil boom starting in the 1960s, Lebanon-based banks were the main recipients of the region's petrodollars.

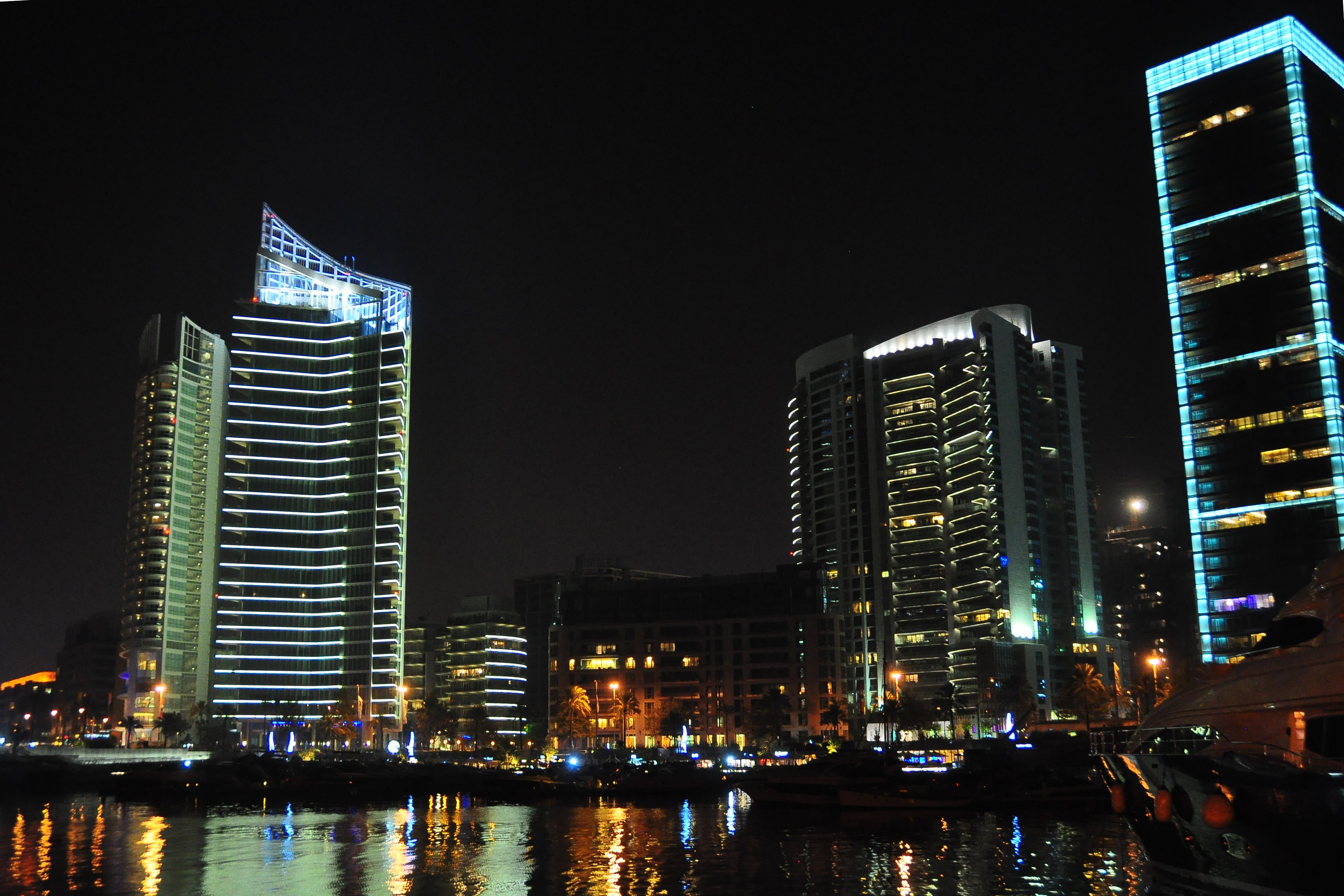
Zaitunay Bay

Beirut is the focal point of the Economy of Lebanon. The capital hosts the headquarters of Banque du Liban (Lebanon's central bank), the Beirut Stock Exchange, the head office of Lebanon's flag-carrier Middle East Airlines, the United Nations Economic and Social Commission for Western Asia, the Union of Arab Banks, and the Union of Arab Stock Exchanges.

=== Banking and finance ===
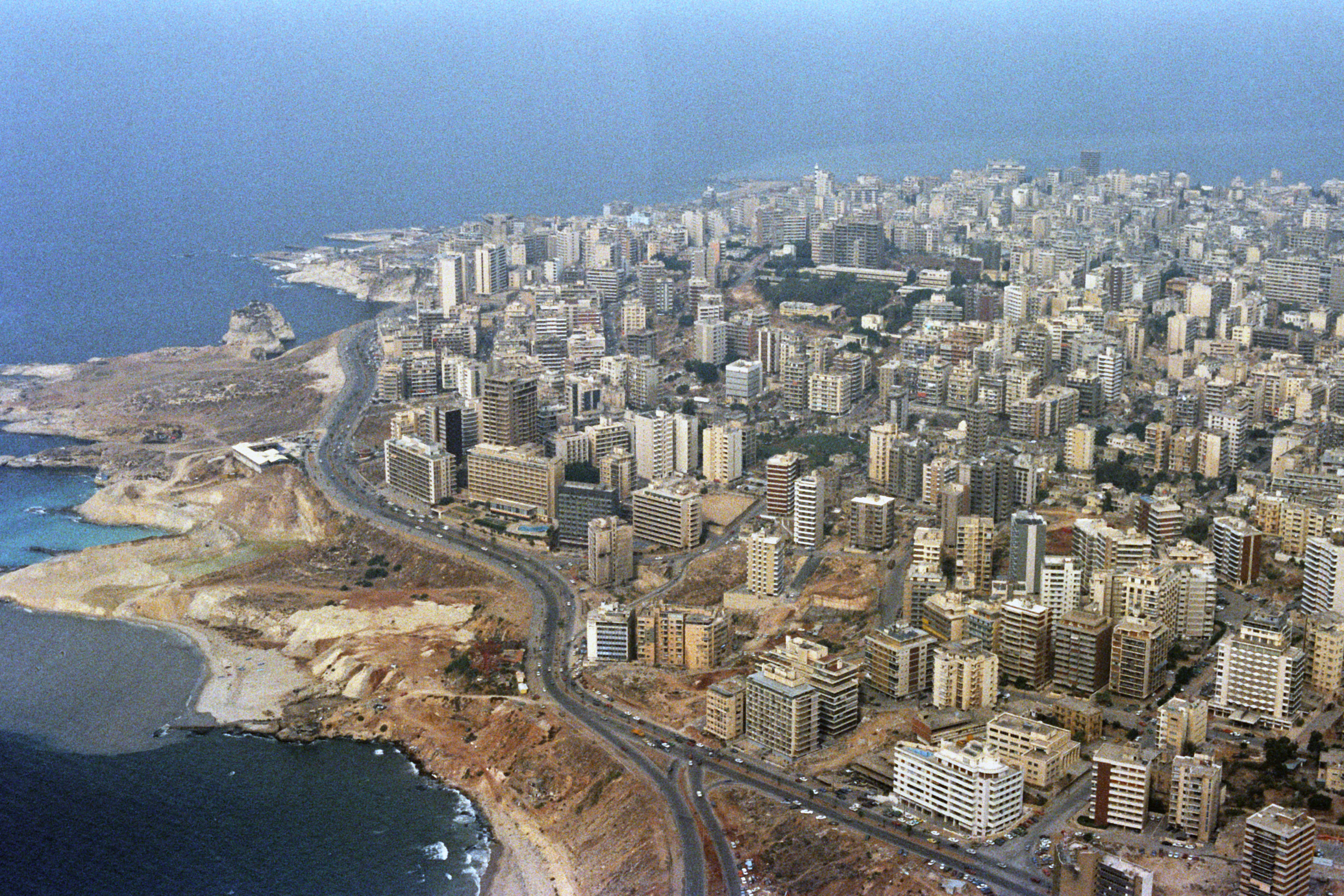
Ras Beirut, 1983

The banking system is the backbone of the local economy with a balance sheet of $152 billion at the end of 2012, nearing 3.5 times the GDP estimated at $43 billion by the IMF. Bank deposits also increased in 2012 by 8% to 125 billion dollars, 82 percent of the sector's assets. "Banks are still attracting deposits because the interest rates offered are higher than the ones in Europe and the United States", says Marwan Mikhael, head of research at BLOM Bank.

Beirut's foreign reserves were still close to an all-time high when they reached $32.5 billion in 2011 and analysts say that the Central Bank can cover nearly 80 percent of the Lebanese currency in the market. This means that the Central Bank can easily cope with any unforeseen crisis in the future thanks to the massive foreign currency reserves.

The Lebanese banking system is endowed with several characteristics that promote the role of Beirut as a regional financial centre, in terms of ensuring protection for foreign capital and earnings. The Lebanese currency is fully convertible and can be exchanged freely with any other currency. Moreover, no restrictions are put on the free flow of capital and earnings into and out of the Lebanese economy. The passing of the banking secrecy law on 3 September 1956, subjected all banks established in Lebanon as well as foreign banks' branches to the "secret of the profession". Both article 16 of law No. 282 dated 30 December 1993 and article 12 of decree No. 5451 dated 26 August 1994, offer exemptions from income tax on all interest and revenues earned on all types of accounts opened in Lebanese banks. On the first of April 1975, decree No. 29 established a free banking zone by granting the Lebanese government the right to exempt non-residents' deposits and liabilities in foreign currency from: the income tax on interest earned, the required reserves imposed by the Banque Du Liban by virtue of article 76 of the Code of Money and Credit, the premium of deposit guarantee imposed on bank deposits to the profit of the National Deposit Guarantee Institution.

=== Tourism ===
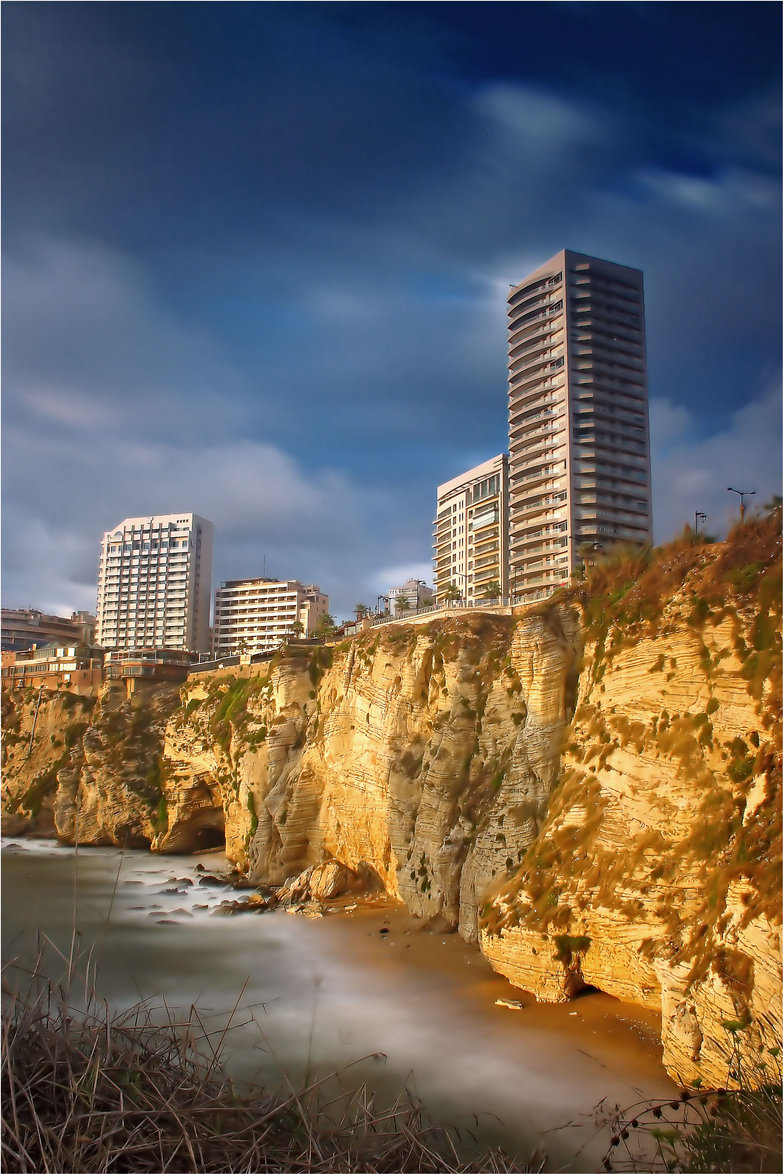
Raouché

The tourism industry in Beirut has been historically important to the local economy and remains to this day to be a major source of revenue for the city, and Lebanon in general. Before the Lebanese Civil War, Beirut was widely regarded as the "Paris of the Middle East", and also "Switzerland of the Middle East", often cited as a financial and business hub where visitors could experience the Levantine Mediterranean culture. Beirut's diverse atmosphere and ancient history make it an important destination which is slowly rebuilding itself after continued turmoil. However, in recent times, certain countries, such as the United States, have frequently placed Lebanon, and Beirut in particular, on their travel warnings lists due to the many car bombings and orchestrated acts of political violence.

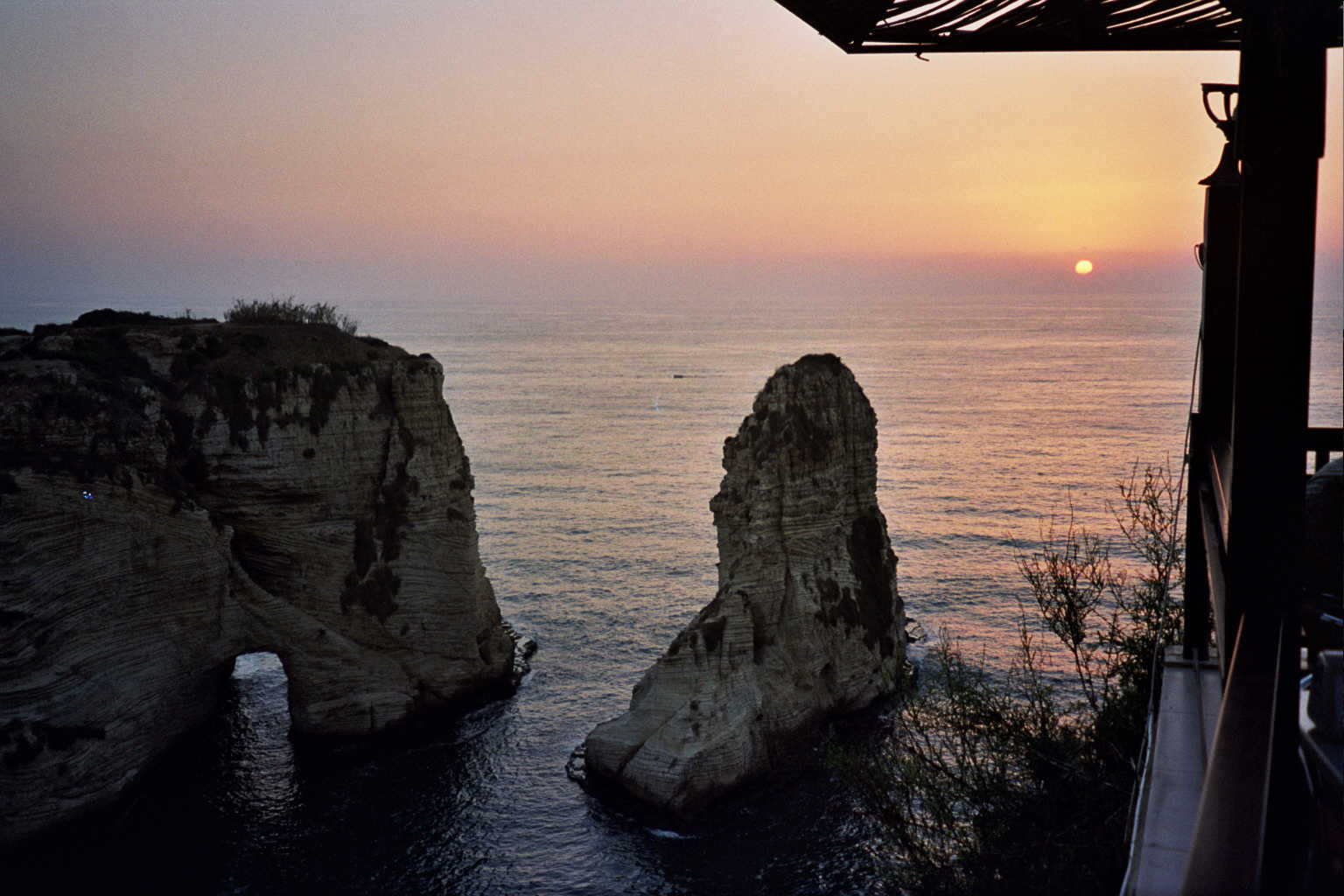
Pigeon Rocks sunset

According to the 2012 tourist statistics, 34% of the tourists in Beirut came from states within the Arab League, 33% came from European countries (mainly France, Germany, and Britain), and 16% from the Americas (about half of which are from the United States).

The largely pedestrianised Beirut Central District is the core of the Beirut tourism scene. The district is a cluster of stone-façade buildings lining arcaded streets and radial alleyways. The architecture of the area is a mix of French Architecture and Venetian Gothic architecture mixed with Arabesque and Ottoman Architecture. The district contains numerous old mosques and crusader churches, as well as uncovered remnants and ruins of the Roman era. The District contains dozens of restaurants, cafes and pubs, as well as a wide range of shopping stores mainly in Beirut Souks. High-rise hotels and towers line the district's New Waterfront, marina and seaside promenade.

Another popular tourist destination in Beirut is the Corniche Beirut, a 4.8 km (3 mi) pedestrian promenade that encircles the capital's seafront from the Saint George Bay in the north all the way to Avenue de Paris and Avenue General de Gaulle south of the city. The Corniche reaches its maximum height above sea level at Raouché, a high-rise residential neighbourhood rising over a giant white limestone cliff and facing the recognisable off-shore Raouché Rocks.

Badaro is a neighbourhood in Beirut, known as a place to stroll during the daytime and a destination for going out in the evening. Badaro is within Beirut's green district with a 75-acre (30-hectare) public park (The Beirut Pine forest) and a 50-acre (20-hectare) hippodrome.

Hamra Street is a long cobblestone street connecting the Beirut Central District with the coastal Raouche area. The street is a large concentration of shopping stores, boutiques, restaurants, banks, street vendors, footpath cafes, newspaper kiosks, and a booming nightlife spurred by students from the neighbouring American University of Beirut. The AUB campus is another popular visitor destination, composed of a cluster of 19th century red-roofed buildings dispersed on a wooded hillside overlooking the Mediterranean.

Gemmayzeh is Beirut's artistic bohemian quarter, full of narrow streets and historic buildings from the French era. It is located East of the Beirut Central District, bordering the Saifi Village. The neighbourhood is well known for its trendy bars and pubs, cafes, restaurants and lounges; most are directly located on Rue Gouraud, the main thoroughfare that cuts through the middle of the district. Travel + Leisure magazine called Gemmayzeh "SoHo by the Sea," due to its colourful and chic cafés amid 1950s apartment buildings and hole-in-the-wall shops. However, Gemmayzeh received the most damage by the Beirut explosion in 2020.

Mohammad Al-Amin Mosque oin Martyrs square

Beirut is a destination for tourists from both the Arab world and West. In Travel + Leisure magazine's World Best Awards 2006, it was ranked the 9th best city in the world. That list was voted upon shortly before the 2006 Lebanon War broke out, but in 2008 The Guardian listed Beirut as one of its top ten cities in the world. The New York Times ranked it at number one on its "44 Places to Go" list for 2009. 2011 MasterCard Index revealed that Beirut had the second-highest visitor spending levels in the Middle East and Africa, totalling $6.5 billion. Beirut was chosen in 2012 by Condé Nast Traveller as the best city in the Middle East, beating Tel Aviv and Dubai.

Many of the tourists are returning Lebanese expatriates, but many are from Western countries. Approximately 3 million visitors visited in 2010; the previous record was 1.4 million in 1974.

Like other forms of tourism, medical tourism in Lebanon is on the rise recently. Although visitors from neighbouring Arab nations make up the bulk of medical tourism patients here due to its proximity, Beirut is strongly trying to woo more Southern Europeans, Asians and North Americans to its land. Its Agency for Investment Development in Lebanon reports that growth in the medical tourism industry is growing by up to 30% a year since 2009. The country's tourism ministry is working closely with the medical sector and top-class hotels to create an organised, quality medical destination. Major hotel and spa chains work with local clinics, travel agencies and the tourism ministry to create comprehensive healthcare and recuperation packages for foreign visitors. The government is highly involved in this industry and strives to make the process as easy as possible. Cosmetic surgery is a major component of medical tourism in Lebanon. Most of the foreign patients come for routine operations like plastic surgery, dental or eye surgery, and Beirut's hospitals are also capable of performing specialised procedures such as internal bypass surgery and other technical treatments. Its top clinics and hospitals like Sahel General are equipped to handle the full range of surgical procedures. Beirut-based Clemenceau Medical Center (CMC), affiliated with Johns Hopkins International, was ranked one of the world's top ten best hospitals for medical tourism in 2012.

== Government ==
Beirut is the capital of Lebanon and its seat of government. The Lebanese Parliament, all the Ministries and most of the public administrations, embassies and consulates are there. Beirut Governorate is one of eight mohafazat (plural of mohafazah, or governorate).

	Name	Took office	Left office
1	Kamel Hamieh	1936	1941
2	Nicholas Rizk	1946	1952
3	George Assi	1952	1956
4	Bachour Haddad	1956	1958
5	Philip Boulos	1959	1960
6	Emile Yanni	1960	1967
7	Shafic Bou Haydar	1967	1977
8	Mitri El Nammar	1977	1987
9	George Smaha	1987	1991
10	Nayef El Malouf	1992	1995
11	Nicholas Saba	1995	1999
12	Jacob Sarraf	1999	2005
13	Nassif Kaloush	2005	2008
14	Rachid Ammoury Maalouf	2008	2015
15	Jamal Itani	2016	Present

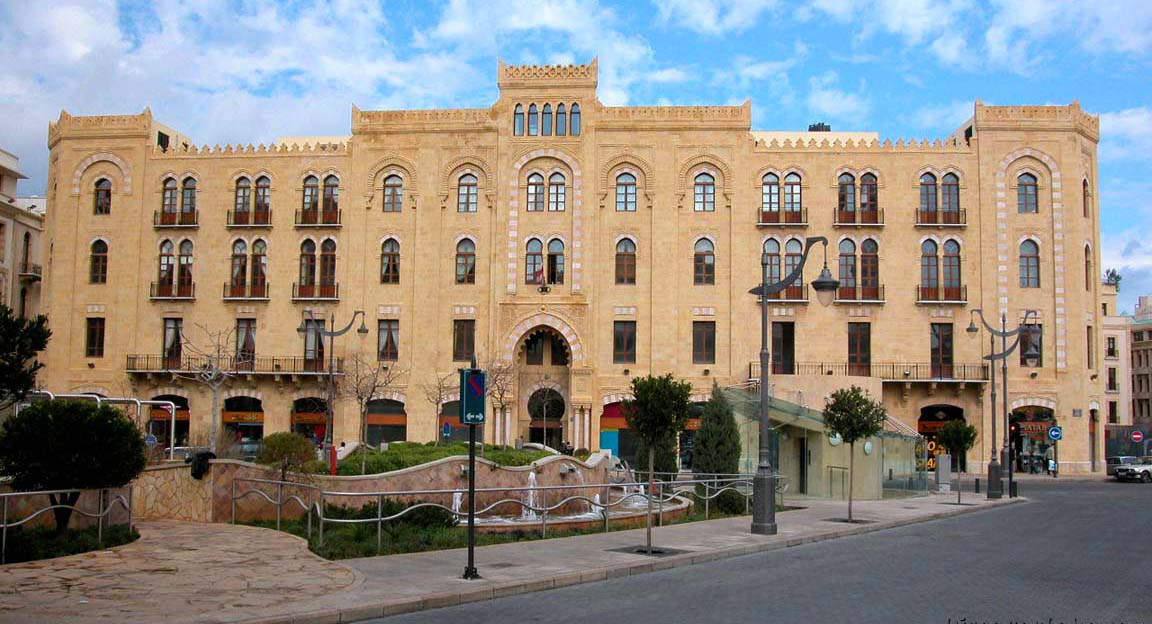
Facade of the Beirut City Hall

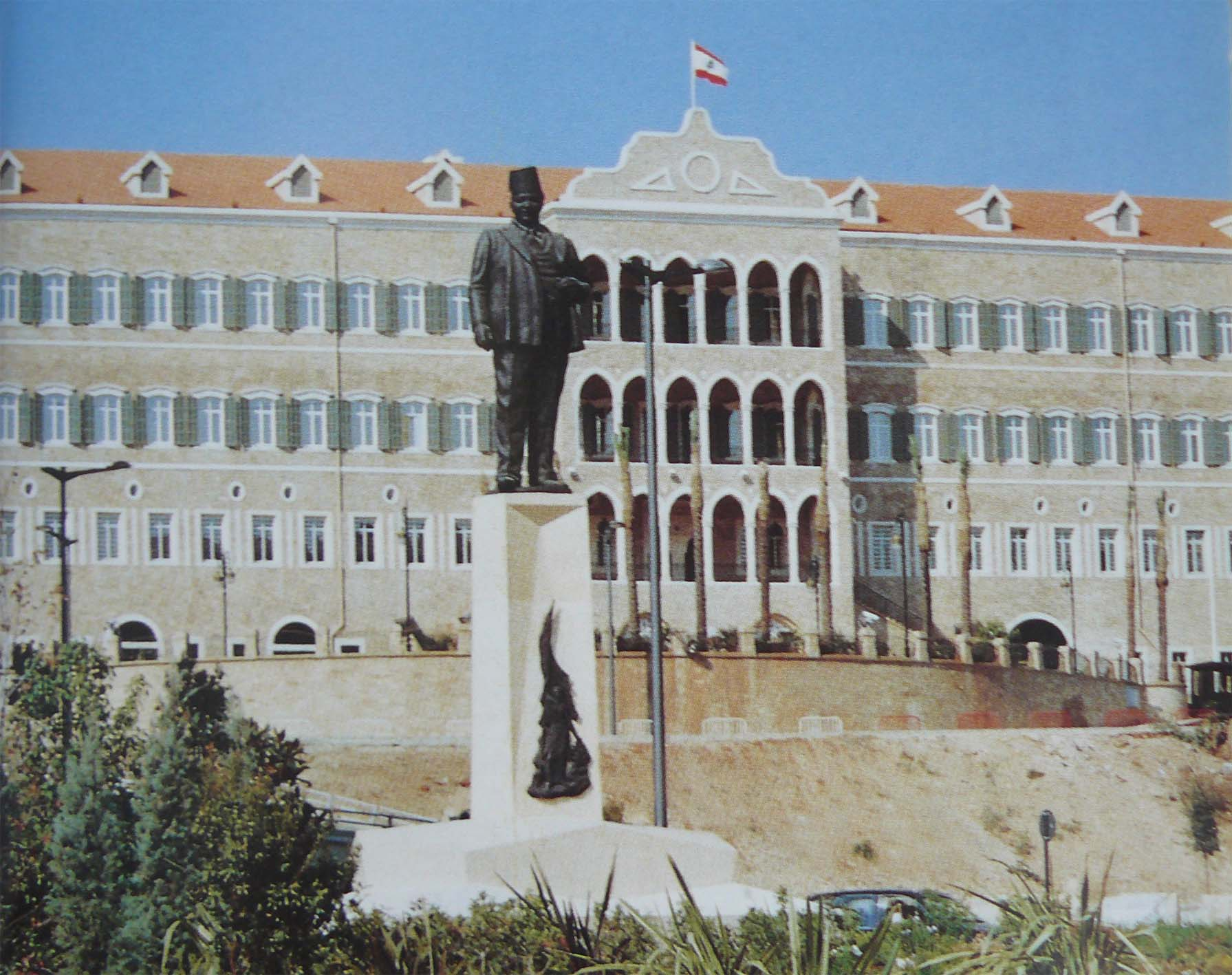
The Grand Serail

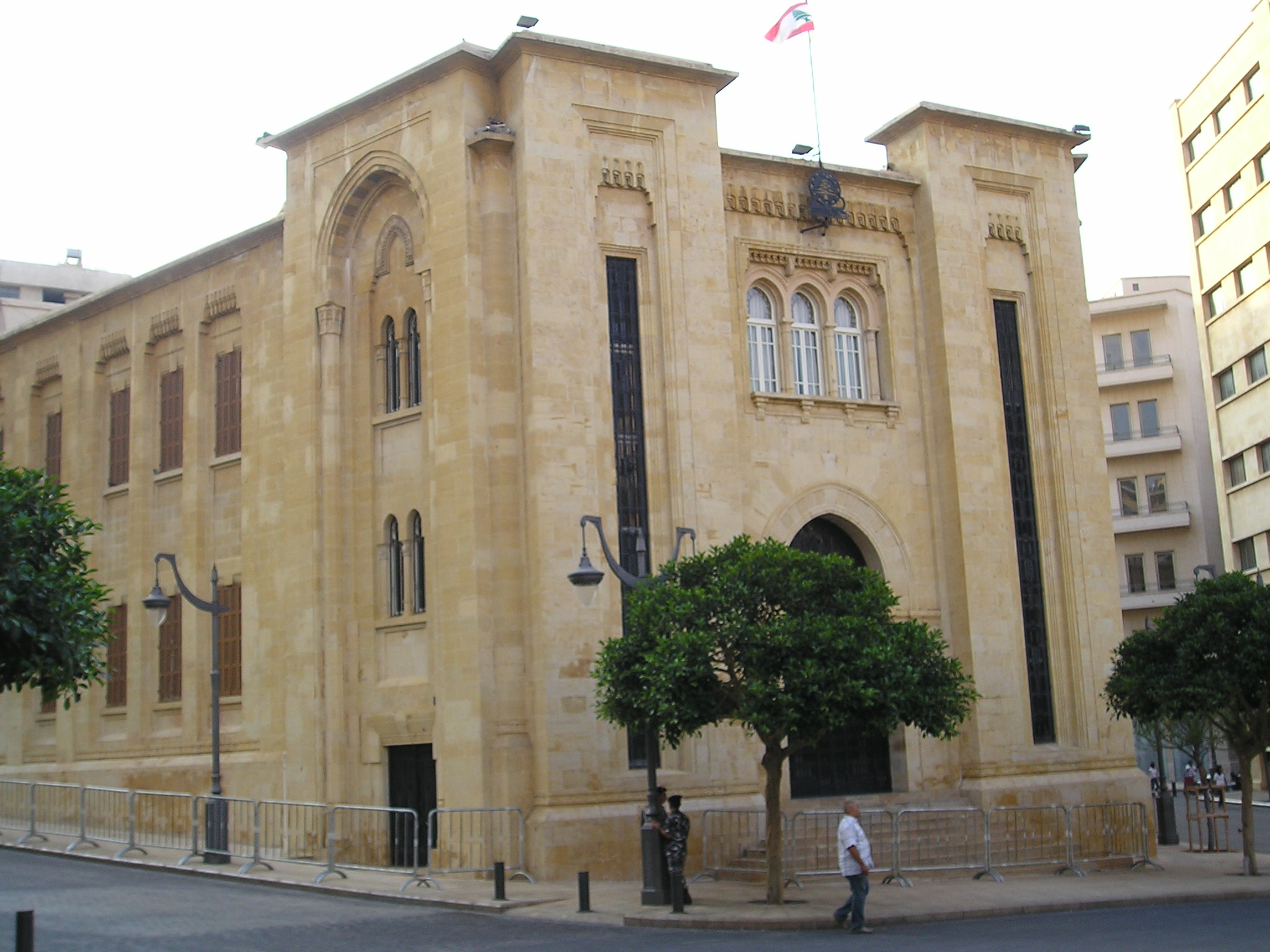
Lebanese Parliament

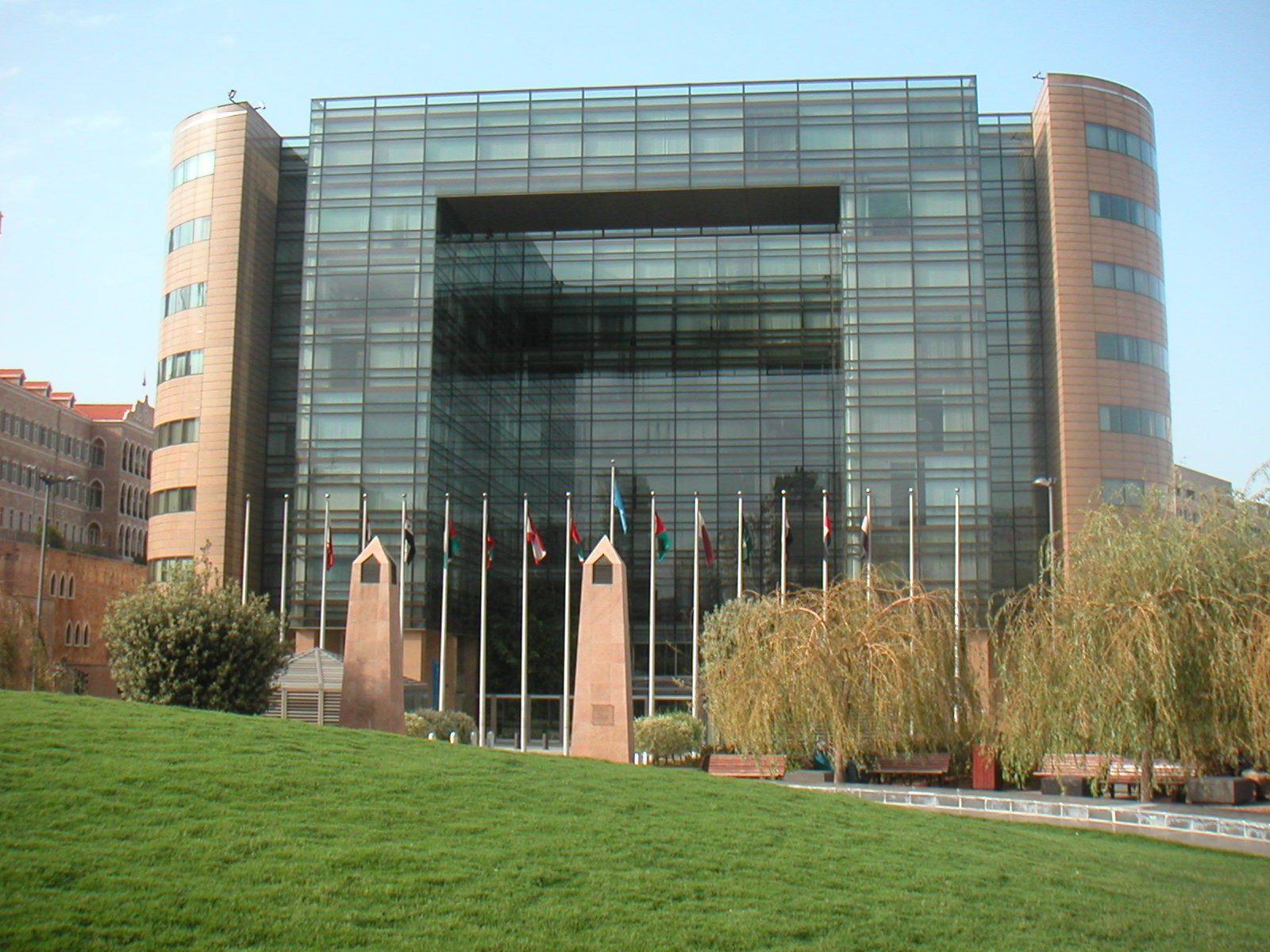
United Nations Lebanon headquarters

=== International organisations ===
The city is home to numerous international organisations. The United Nations Economic and Social Commission for Western Asia (ESCWA) is headquartered in downtown Beirut, The Arab Air Carriers' Organization (AACO), the Union of Arab Banks and the Union of Arab Stock Exchanges and the World youth alliance are also headquartered in the city. The International Labour Organization (ILO) and UNESCO (United Nations Educational, Scientific and Cultural Organization) both have regional offices in Beirut covering the Arab world.

== Education ==
Higher education throughout Lebanon is provided by universities, colleges and technical and vocational institutes. The Directorate General of Higher Education is responsible for managing universities, colleges, and institutes in Beirut and nationwide.

The American University of Beirut (AUB) and Université Saint-Joseph (USJ) are the oldest English-language and French-language universities in the country, respectively. AUB was founded in 1866, and USJ in 1875. The Lebanese University is the only public institution for higher education in Beirut. Beirut is also home to Lebanese American University (LAU), American University of Science and Technology (AUST), University of Balamand, École Supérieure des Affaires (ESA), Beirut Arab University (BAU), Haigazian University (HU), Lebanese International University (LIU), Notre Dame University – Louaize (NDU), and Université La Sagesse (ULS).

Among the private secondary schools in Beirut are Lycee Abdel Kader, Grand Lycée Franco-Libanais, Lycée Franco-Libanais Verdun, American Community School, International College, Collège Louise Wegmann, Sagesse High School, Rawdah High School, Saint Mary's Orthodox College, Collège Notre Dame de Nazareth, Collège du Sacré-Coeur Gemmayzé, Collège Protestant Français, Armenian Evangelical Central High School, German School of Beirut, and the Armenian Hamazkayin Arslanian College.

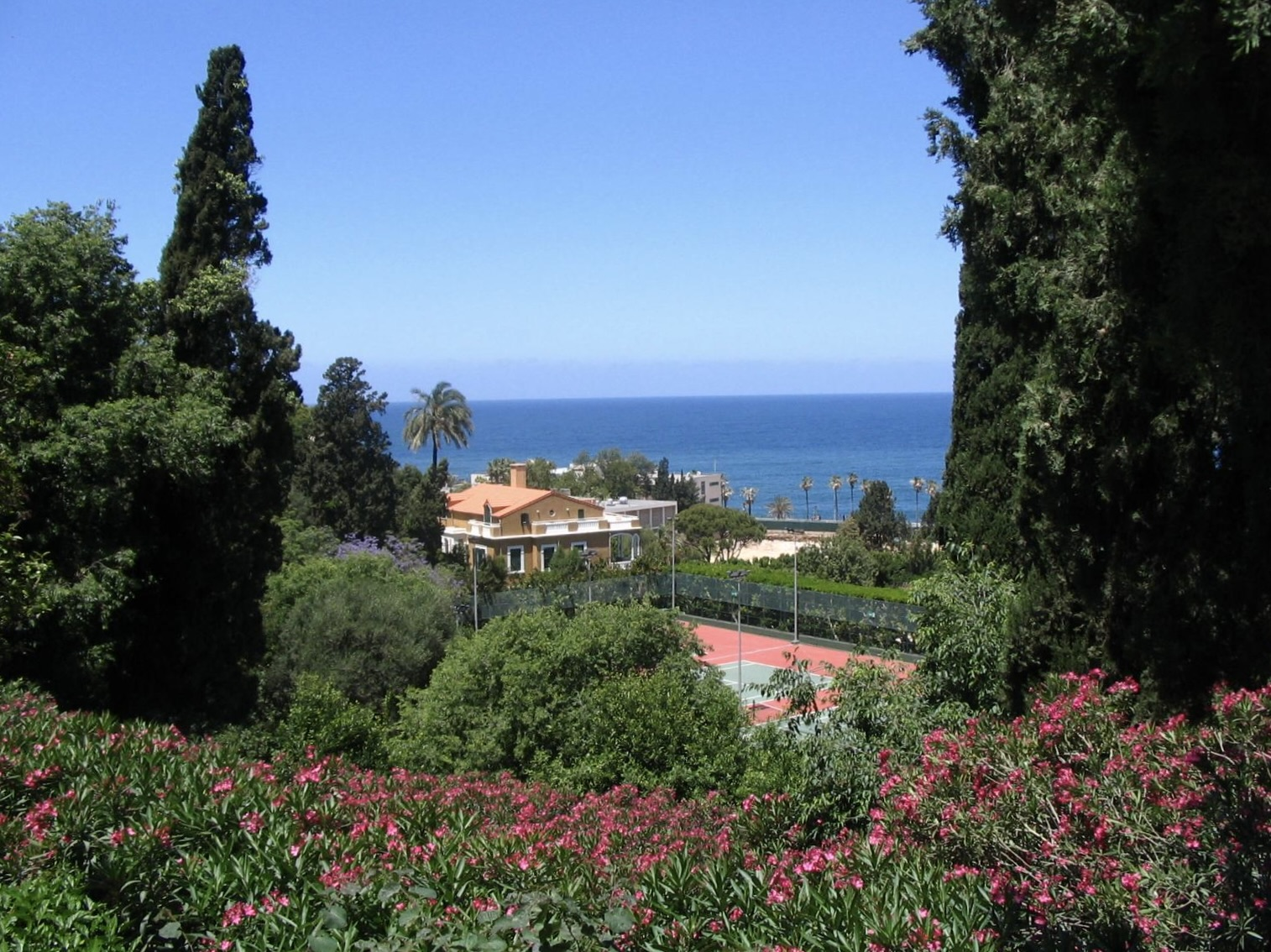
AUB established in 1866 by the American Board of Commissioners for Foreign Missions.

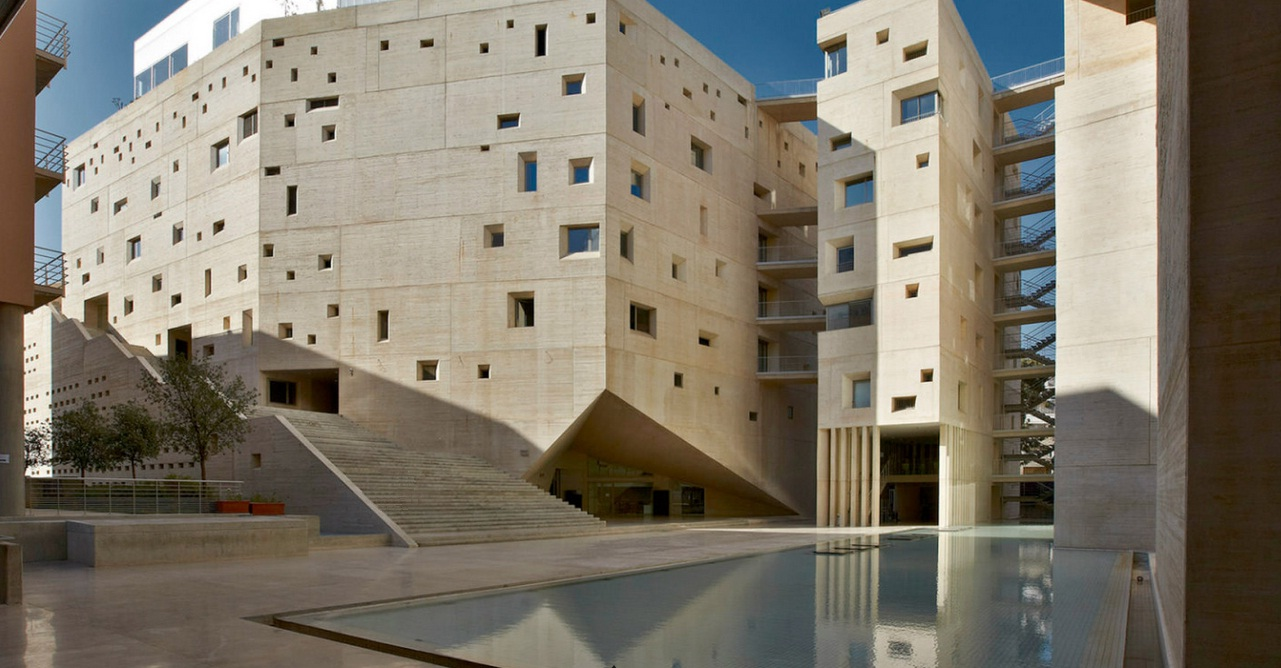
Saint Joseph University, or Université Saint-Joseph, founded by the Jesuits in 1875

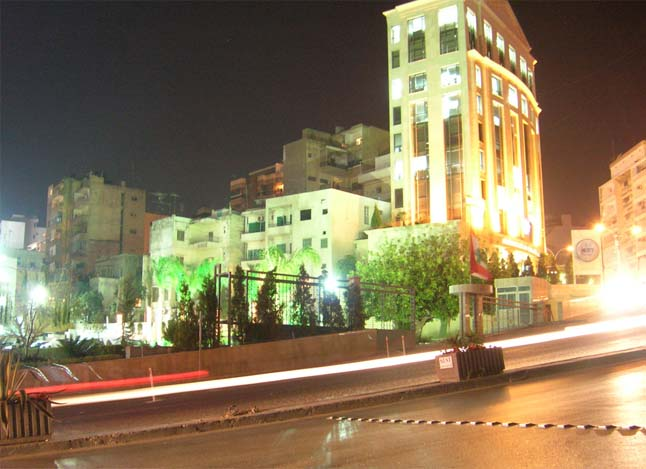
American University of Science and Technology, established in Beirut in 1989

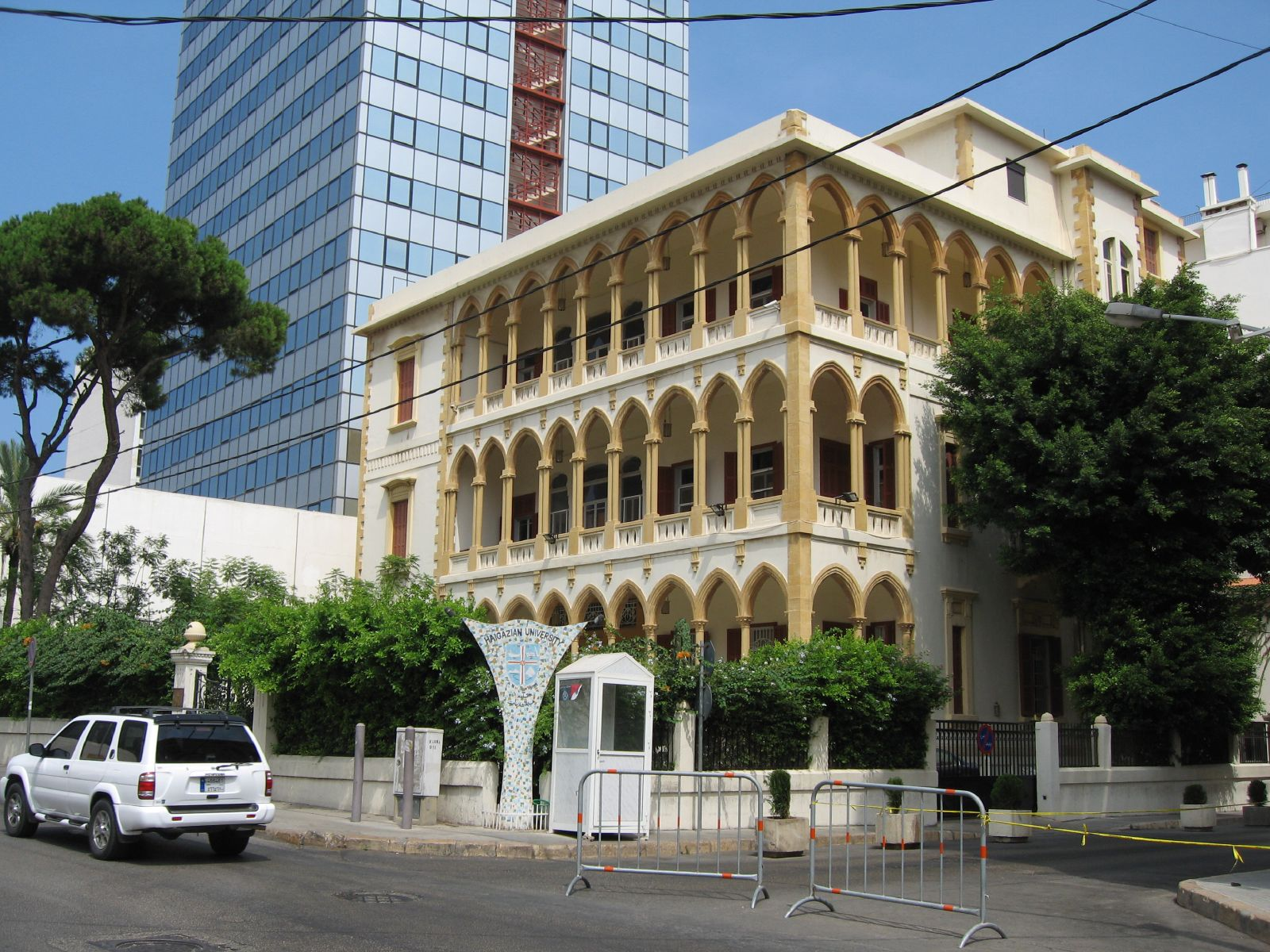
Haigazian University was founded in 1955 by the Armenian Evangelical community.

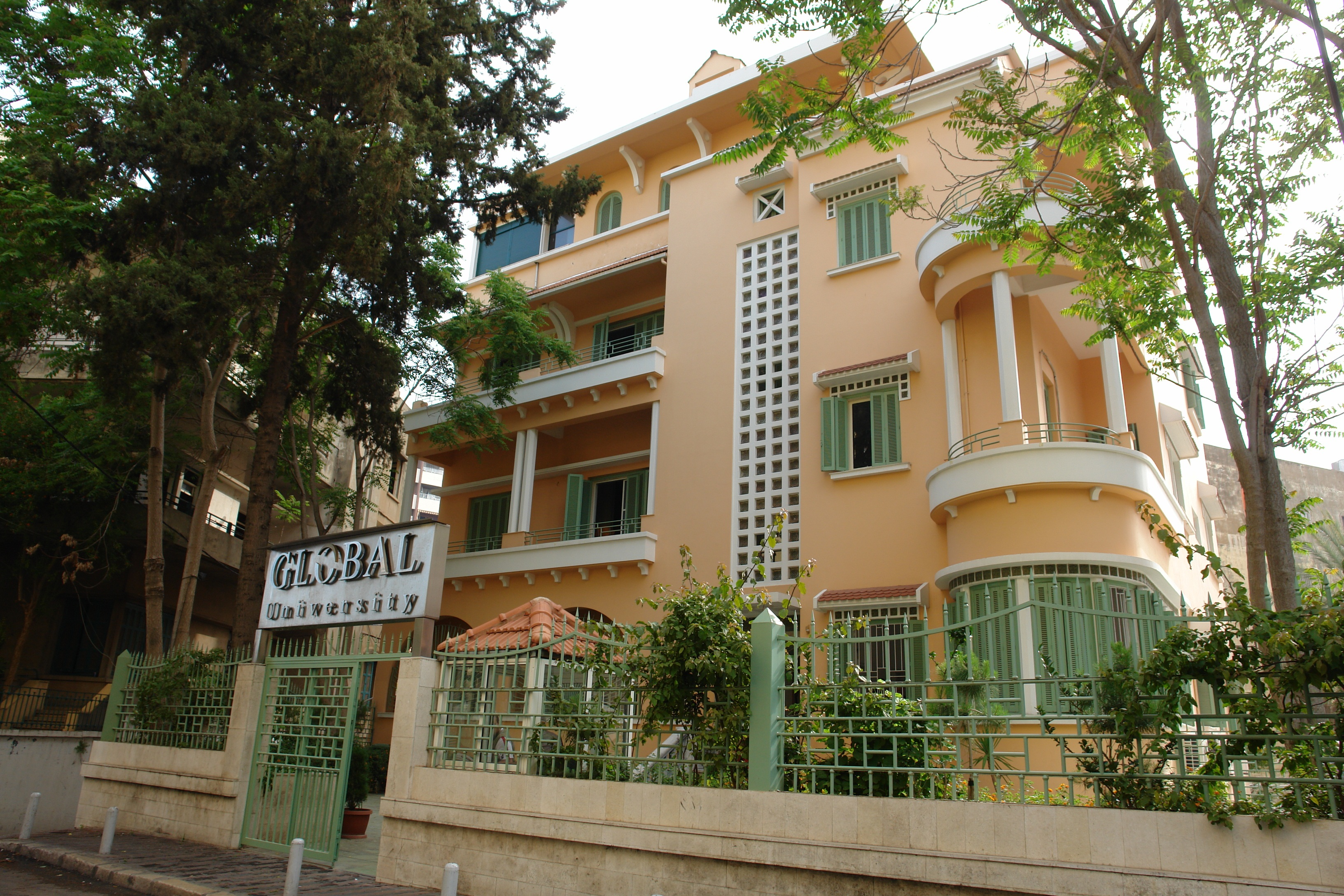
Global University in Beirut

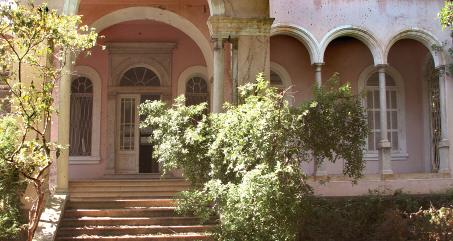
École supérieure des affaires, founded in 1996 as a joint co-operation between the Paris Chamber of Commerce (Chambre de Commerce et d'Industrie de Paris) and the Bank of Lebanon

== Transportation ==
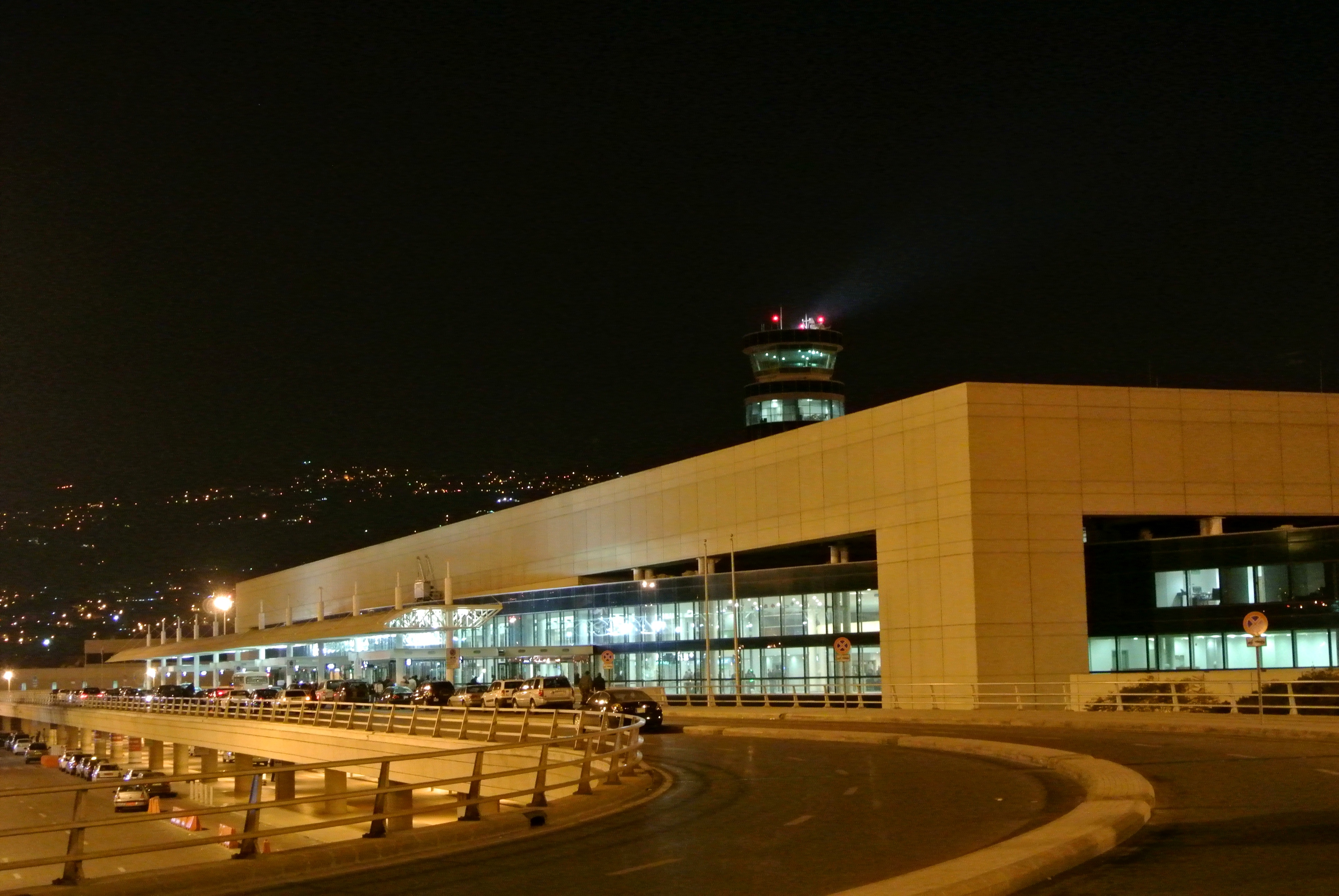
Beirut–Rafic Hariri International Airport

The city's renovated airport is the Rafic Hariri International Airport, located in the southern suburbs. The Port of Beirut, one of the largest and most commercial in the eastern Mediterranean, is another port of entry. As a final destination, Lebanon can be reached by road from Damascus via the Beqaa valley in the east.

Beirut has frequent bus connections to other cities in Lebanon and major cities in Syria such as Homs and its capital Damascus. There are a number of different companies providing public transport in Lebanon. The publicly owned buses are managed by Office des Chemins de Fer et des Transports en Commun (OCFTC – "Railway and Public Transportation Authority"). Buses for northern destinations and Syria leave from Charles Helou Station.

The Ministry of Public Works and Transportation tendered an order for 250 intra and inter-buses in 2012 to better serve regions outside the capital as well as congestion-choked Beirut, hoping to lessen the use of private cars. By 5 July 2012, 42 buses were operating.

Beirut has also private buses that are provided by the Lebanese Commuting Company.

In 2017, Beirut introduced a bike sharing service in certain areas of the city.

In 2024, Ahdab Commuting and Trading Company (ACTC), alongside the Ministry of Transport, reintroduced a proper public bus system with an appropriate network of lanes using the 50 buses donated by France in 2022. The network connects most areas of Beirut through 7 major lines (B1-7), as well as connecting Beirut to other major cities like Tripoli and Saida through 4 lines (ML1-4). These lines however do not replace the existing service microbuses, they complement them.

== Culture ==
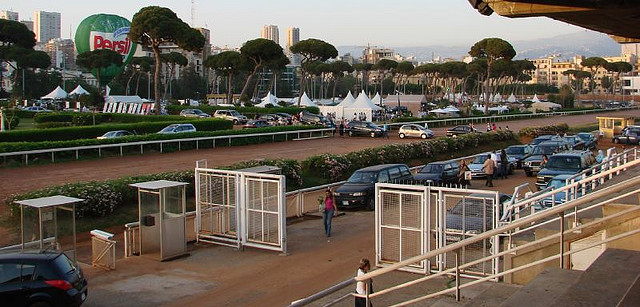
The Garden Show & Spring Festival at the Beirut Hippodrome

The culture of Beirut has evolved under the influence of many different peoples and civilisations, such as Greeks, Romans, Arabs, Ottoman Turks and French. The law school in downtown Beirut was one of the world's earliest and was considered to be a leading centre of legal studies in the Eastern Roman Empire.

Beirut hosted the Francophonie and Arab League summits in 2002, and in 2007 it hosted the ceremony for the Prix Albert Londres, which rewards outstanding francophone journalists every year. The city also hosted the Jeux de la Francophonie in 2009. In the same year, it was proclaimed World Book Capital by UNESCO.

Beirut has also been called the "party capital of the Arab world". Rue Monnot has an international reputation among clubbers, and Rue Gouraud in districts such as Gemmayze and Mar Mikhael have emerged as new hotspots for bar patrons and clubbers, as well as "The Alleyway" in Hamra Street.

=== Museums ===
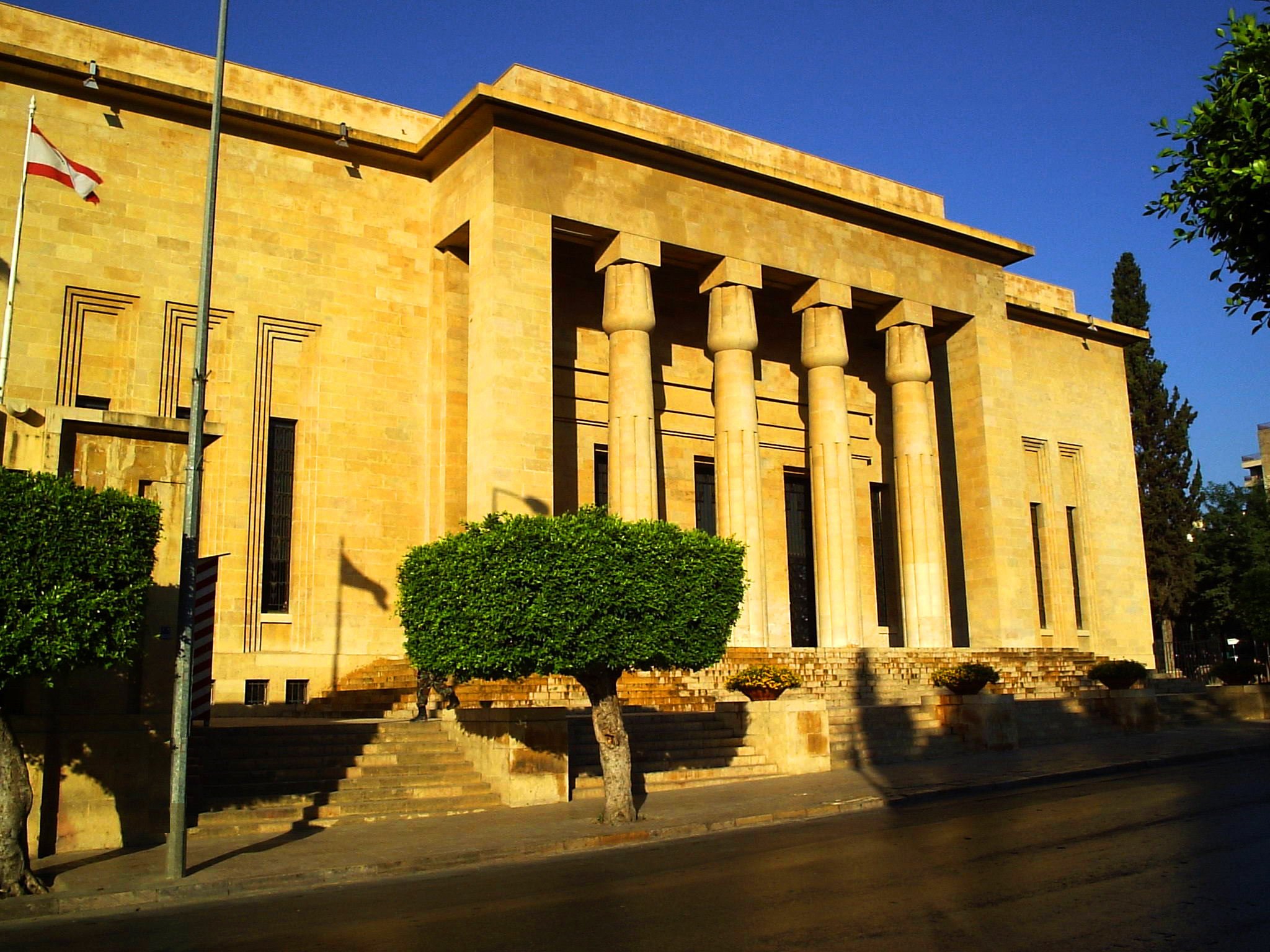
The National Museum of Beirut

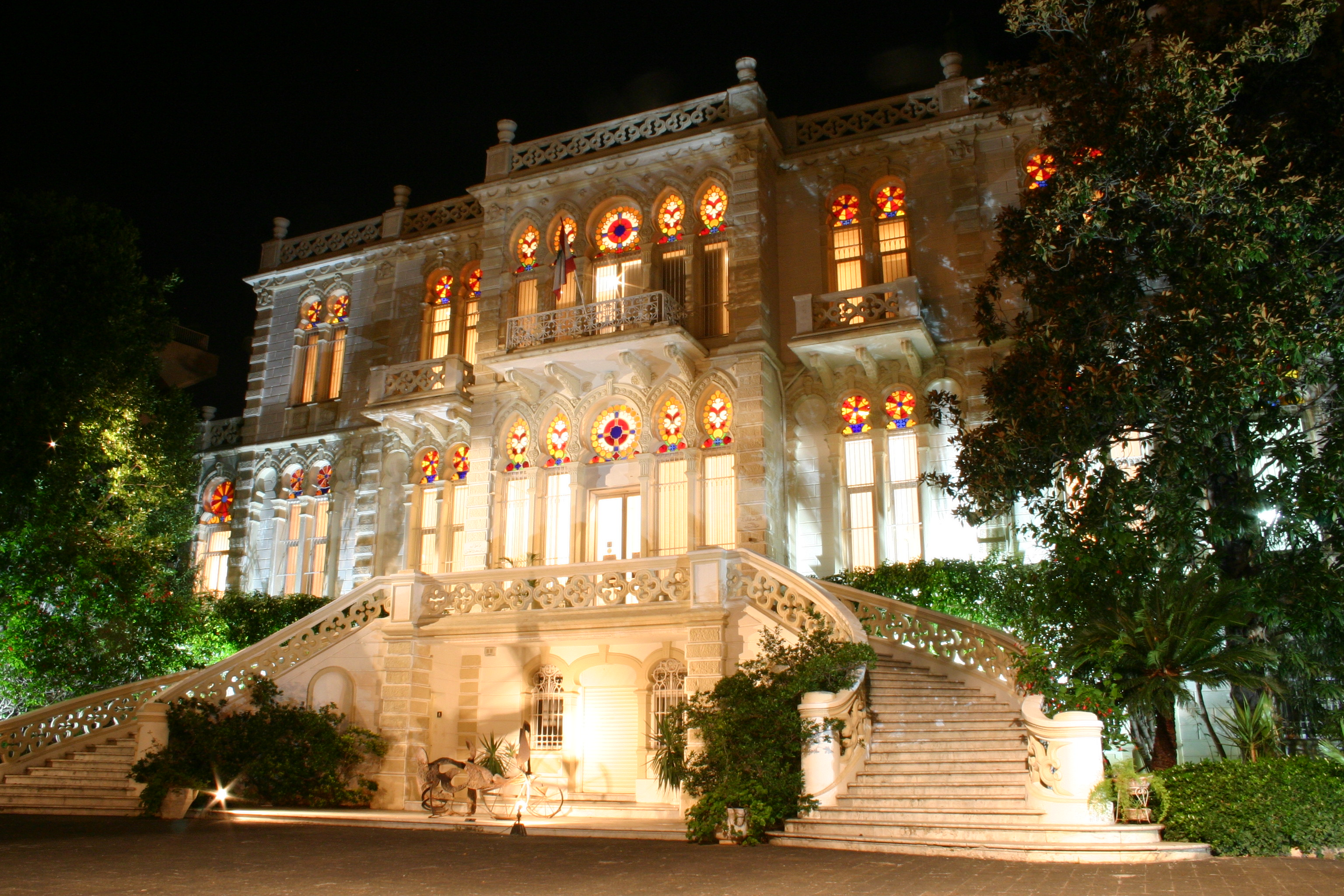
Sursock Museum

The National Museum of Beirut is the principal museum of archaeology in Lebanon. It has about 1,300 exhibits ranging in date from prehistoric times to the medieval Mamluk period. The Archaeological Museum of the American University of Beirut is the third-oldest museum in the Middle East, exhibiting a wide range of artefacts from Lebanon and neighbouring countries. Sursock Museum was built by the illustrious Sursock family at the end of the 19th century as a private villa for Nicolas Sursock, and then donated to the Lebanese state upon his death. It now houses Beirut's most influential and popular art museum. The permanent collection shows a set of Japanese engravings, numerous works of Islamic art and classic Italian paintings, while temporary exhibitions are also shown throughout the year. The Robert Mouawad Private Museum near Beirut's Grand Serail exhibits Henri Pharaon's private collection of archaeology and antiques.

Planet Discovery is a children's science museum with interactive experiments, exhibitions, performances, workshops and awareness competitions. The Saint Joseph University opened the Museum of Lebanese Prehistory in 2000, the first prehistory museum in the Arabic Middle East, displaying bones, stone tools and neolithic pottery collected by Jesuits.

In October 2013, the Mim Museum, a private mineral museum, opened to the public. It displays approximately 2,000 minerals representing over 70 countries. The collection includes a range of specimens selected for their variety and quality.[1][2] The museum features educational displays and screens detailing the scientific applications of mineralogy.

A dedicated wing houses Mimodactylus libanensis, nicknamed 'Mimo,' a complete pterosaur fossil discovered in Lebanon. Interactive exhibits accompany the fossil, including a hologram, a 3D short film, a full-scale reconstruction, and an interactive flying simulation. The museum also hosts 'Fish'n'Stone,' a thematic exhibition featuring 200 marine fossils collected from the Lebanese mountains, presented in collaboration with Mémoire du Temps alongside animated displays explaining the history of fossil formation.

=== Tourism ===
Beirut was named the top place to visit by The New York Times in 2009, and as one of the ten liveliest cities in the world by Lonely Planet in the same year. According to a 2010 study by the American global consulting firm Mercer comparing high-end items such as upscale residential areas and entertainment venues, Beirut was ranked as the 4th most expensive city in the Middle East and 15th among the Upper Middle Income Countries included in the survey. Beirut came in first place regionally and 10th place internationally in a 2010 study by "EuroCost International" about the rental markets for high quality housing. Beirut is an international hub of highly active and diverse nightlife with bars, dance bars and nightclubs staying open well past midnight. The 2011 MasterCard Index revealed that Beirut had the second-highest visitor spending levels in the Middle East and Africa, totalling $6.5 billion. Beirut was chosen in 2012 by Condé Nast Traveller as the best city in the Middle East. In 2013, Condé Nast Traveller ranked Beirut in the top 20 best cities in the world.

On 7 December 2014, Beirut was selected to be among the New 7 Wonders of Cities, along with Doha, Durban, La Paz, Havana, Kuala Lumpur and Vigan. The campaign was held by New 7 Wonders.

In 2016, Yahoo listed Beirut as the best international city for food. Travel and Leisure ranked Beirut in the top 15 of the world's best cities.

It was voted the must-visit city for the year 2019 by World Tourists.

Due to anti-government protests as of October 2019 followed by dire economic situation and travel bans due to coronavirus outbreak, the tourism sector was badly affected resulting in decrease of number of tourists.

=== Media ===
A large number of TV networks, radio stations, newspaper, and book publishing industries run operations and therefore are headquartered in Beirut.

Television stations that are headquartered in Beirut include state run Télé Liban, in addition to the private networks LBC, ÓTV (Orange TV), MTV Lebanon, Tele Lumiere (Catholic TV), Future TV, New TV, NBN, and ANB among others. Some of these networks are linked to various Lebanese political parties.

Other channels that can be seen here include Saudi TV 1 on 33 UHF as well as MBC 1, MBC 4, MBC Action, Al Jazeera, Rotana, OSN First, OSN News, Al Yawm and Arabic Series Channel on 45 UHF.

Radio Stations Mix FM Lebanon, Virgin Radio Lebanon, Radio One Lebanon, Sawt el Ghad, RLL, Jaras Scoop, and NRJ Lebanon are based in Beirut and run operations from here.

While newspapers that headquartered here include Daily Beirut, An-Nahar, Al Joumhouria, As-Safir, Al Mustaqbal, Al-Akhbar, Al-Balad, Ad-Diyar, Al Anwar, Al Sharq, newspapers and magazines that are published in French and English are also available, and these include L'Orient Le Jour (since 1970), La Revue Du Liban, Al Balad-French Version, Al Intiqad, Magazine L'Hebdo, Le Commerce du Levant, Executive Magazine (weekly), Beirut Online, Beirut Times (weekly) and Monday Morning.

=== Sports ===
The Lebanese capital hosted the Mediterranean Games in 1959, FIBA Asia Champions Cup in 1999, 2000, 2012, the AFC Asian Cup in 2000, and the FIBA Asia Cup in 2010. Beirut was the host city for the 6th Annual Games of the Jeux de la Francophonie in 2009. Beirut also hosted the Pan Arab Games in 1957 and 1997. In 2017, Beirut also hosted the 2017 FIBA Asia Cup.

Beirut, with Sidon and Tripoli, hosted the 2000 AFC Asian Cup. There are two stadiums in the city, Camille Chamoun Sports City Stadium and Beirut Municipal Stadium.

Basketball is the most popular sport in Lebanon. Currently, 6 Beirut teams play in the Lebanese Basketball League: Sagesse, Al Riyadi Beirut, Homenetmen Beirut, Hoops Club, Beirut Club, and Antranik.

Other sports events in Beirut include the annual Beirut Marathon, hip ball, weekly horse racing at the Beirut Hippodrome, and golf and tennis tournaments that take place at Golf Club of Lebanon. Three out of the five teams in the Lebanese rugby league championship are based in Beirut. Lebanon men's national ice hockey team plays out of Montreal, in Canada.

=== Art and fashion ===
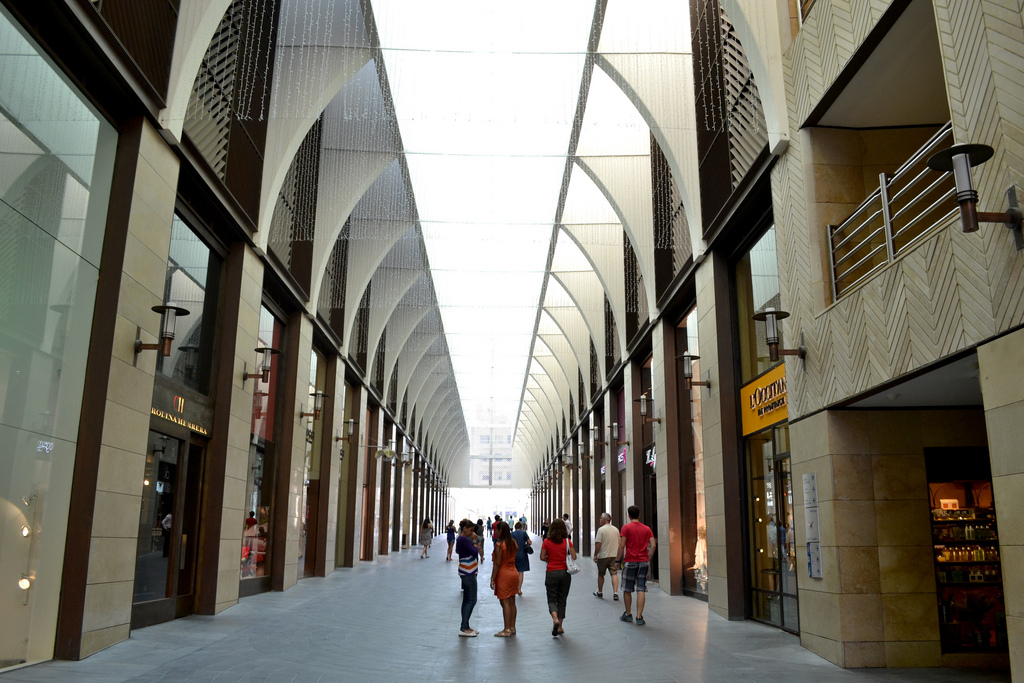
Beirut Souks shopping mall

There are hundreds of art galleries in Beirut and its suburbs. Every year, hundreds of fine art students graduate from universities and institutions. Artist workshops exist all over Lebanon. The inauguration of the Beirut Art Center, a non-profit association, space and platform dedicated to contemporary art in Lebanon, in the Mkalles suburb of Beirut added to the number of exhibition spaces available in the city, with a screening and performance room, mediatheque, book store, café and terrace. Adjacent to the latter is the Ashkal Alwan Home Workspace, a venue hosting cultural events and educational programmes.

A number of international fashion designers have displayed their work in big fashion shows. Most major fashion labels have shops in Beirut's shopping districts, and the city is home to a number of local fashion designers, some of whom like Elie Saab, Yara Farhat, Reem Acra, Zuhair Murad, Georges Chakra, Georges Hobeika, Jean Faris, Nicolas Jebran, Rabih Kayrouz and Abed Mahfouz have achieved international fame.

Beirut is also the home for a dynamic street art scene that has developed after the Lebanese Civil War, one of the most notable street artists is Yazan Halwani who is known to produce the largest murals on the walls of Beirut in areas such as Gemmayzeh, Hamra, Verdun and Achrafieh.

Beirut is also international artists' concert tour stop city. Notable artists that have included Beirut on their concert tours include Shakira, Mariah Carey, Enrique Iglesias, Andrea Bocelli, Pitbull, Engelbert Humperdinck, and Scorpions.

== In art, literature, and popular culture ==
- Tawfiq Yusuf 'Awwad's 1972 novel Death In Beirut (Arabic: طواحين بيروت) takes place in Beirut in the late 1960s.
- Ghada al-Samman's 1977 book Beirut Nightmares (Arabic: كوابيس بيروت) describes Beirut during the civil war in the mid-1970s.
- Caramel, a 2007 film by Nadine Labaki, tells the story of five women who work in a beauty salon in Beirut.
- The 2008 Israeli animated film Waltz with Bashir portrays Beirut during the Israeli invasion in 1982.
- William Henry Bartlett painted a view of the city with Mount Lebanon in the background in 1838, with a poetical illustration by Letitia Elizabeth Landon, as The Cedars of Lebanon.
- American rock band Beirut is named for the city.
- In the American television series Homeland, the episode "Beirut Is Back" (2012) was widely mocked for its portrayal of Beirut's Hamra neighbourhood, which the show depicted as being a Hezbollah stronghold. Lebanon's government considered filing a lawsuit in response to the episode.

== Gallery ==
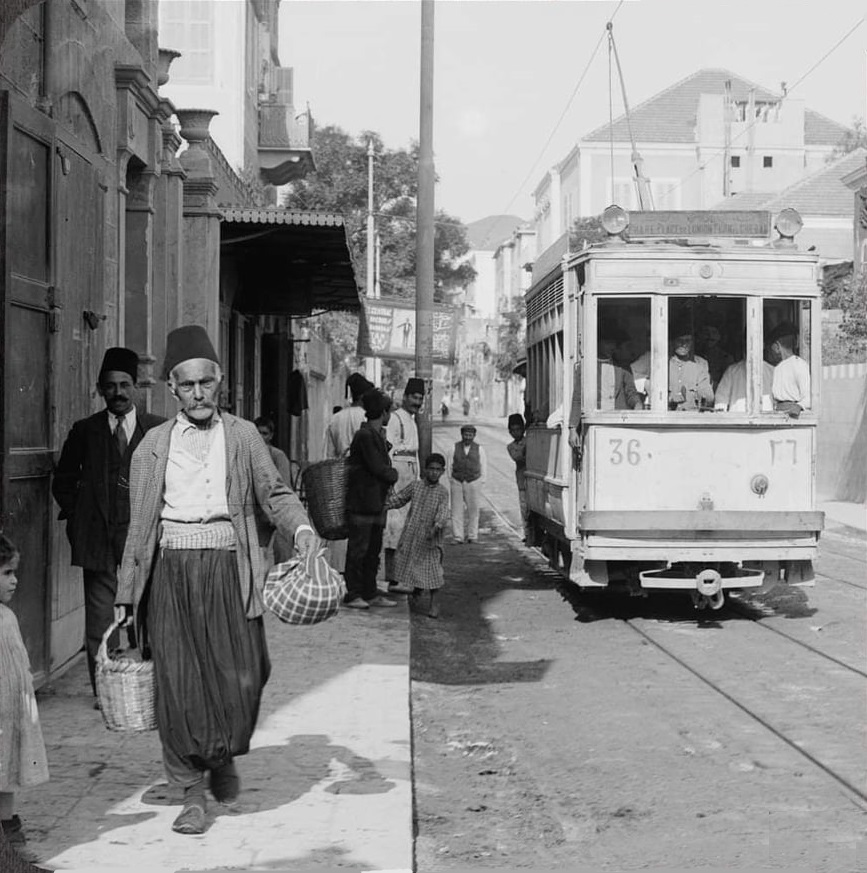
Beirut, 1913

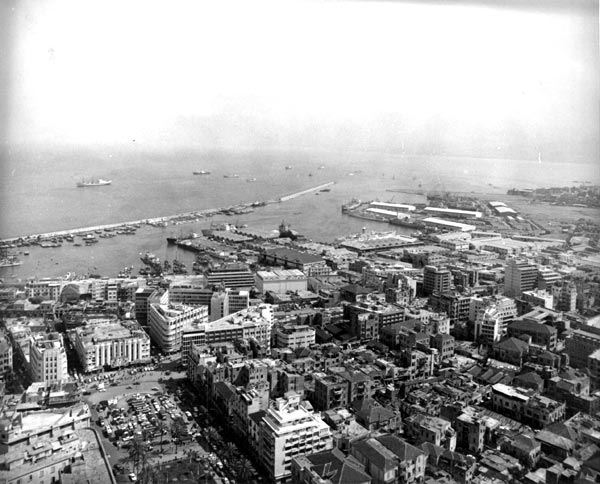
Aerial view of Beirut, 1970

Beirut, 1965

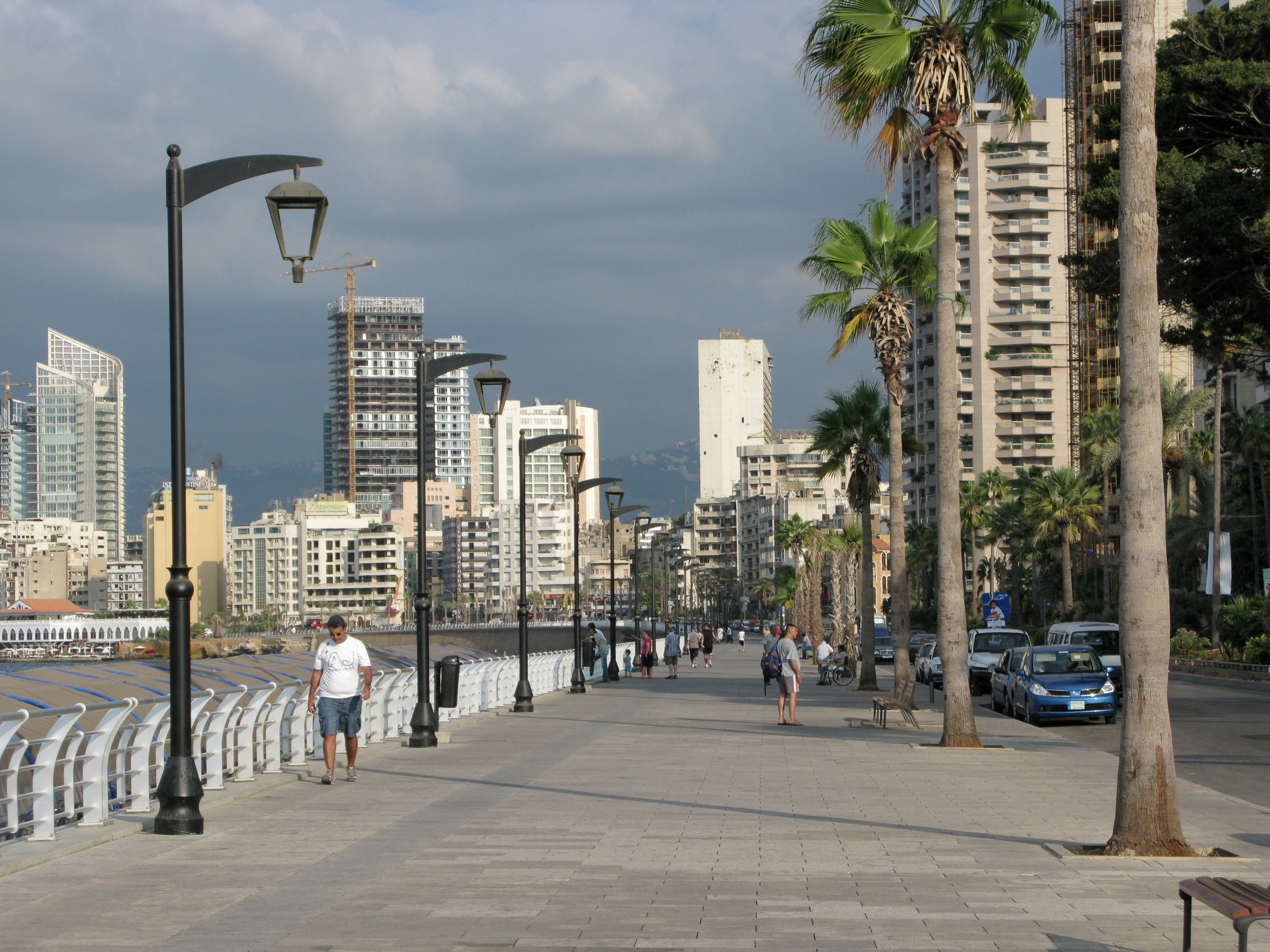
Beirut Corniche

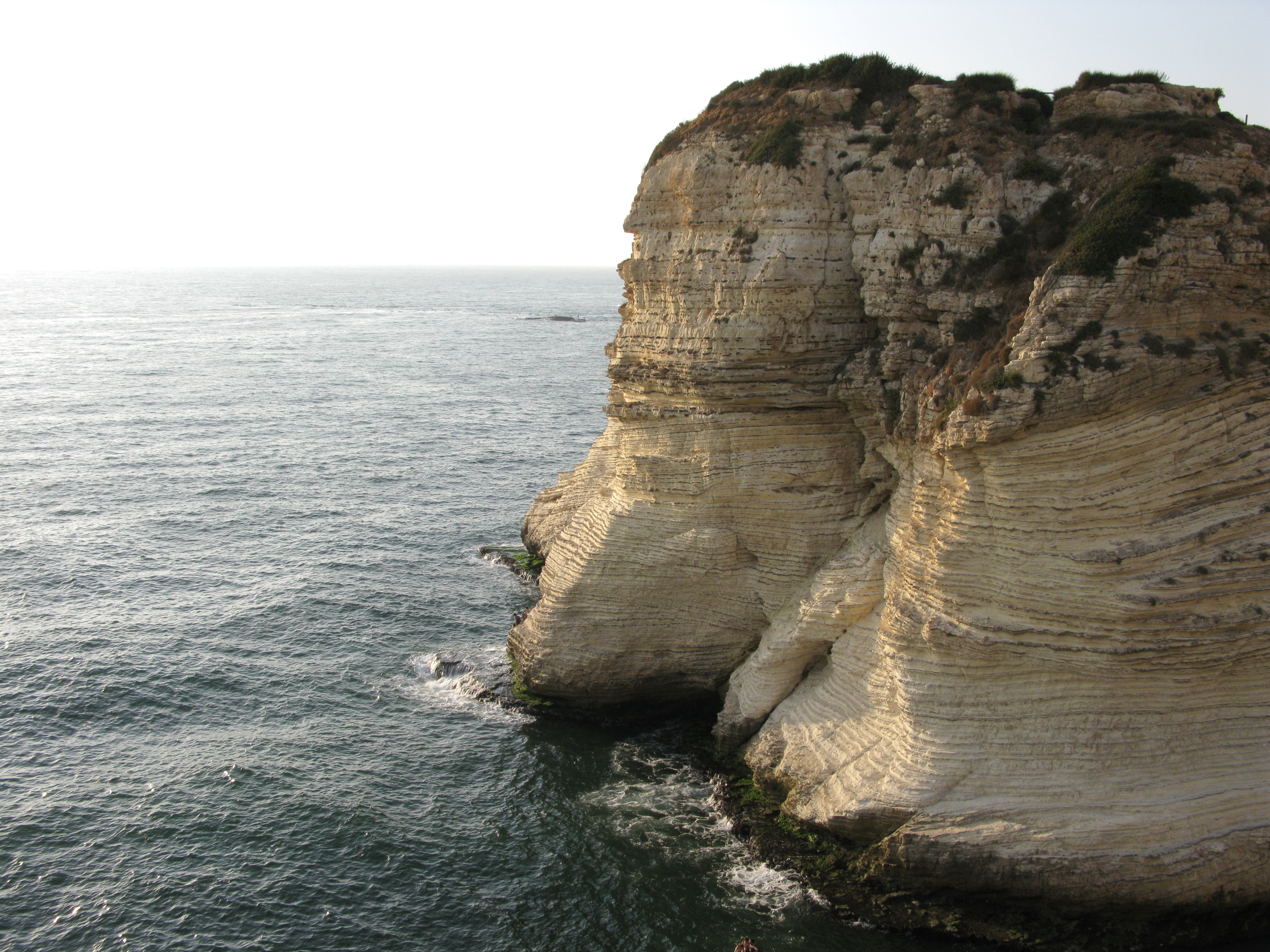
Cliffs, Beirut

Beirut, 1919

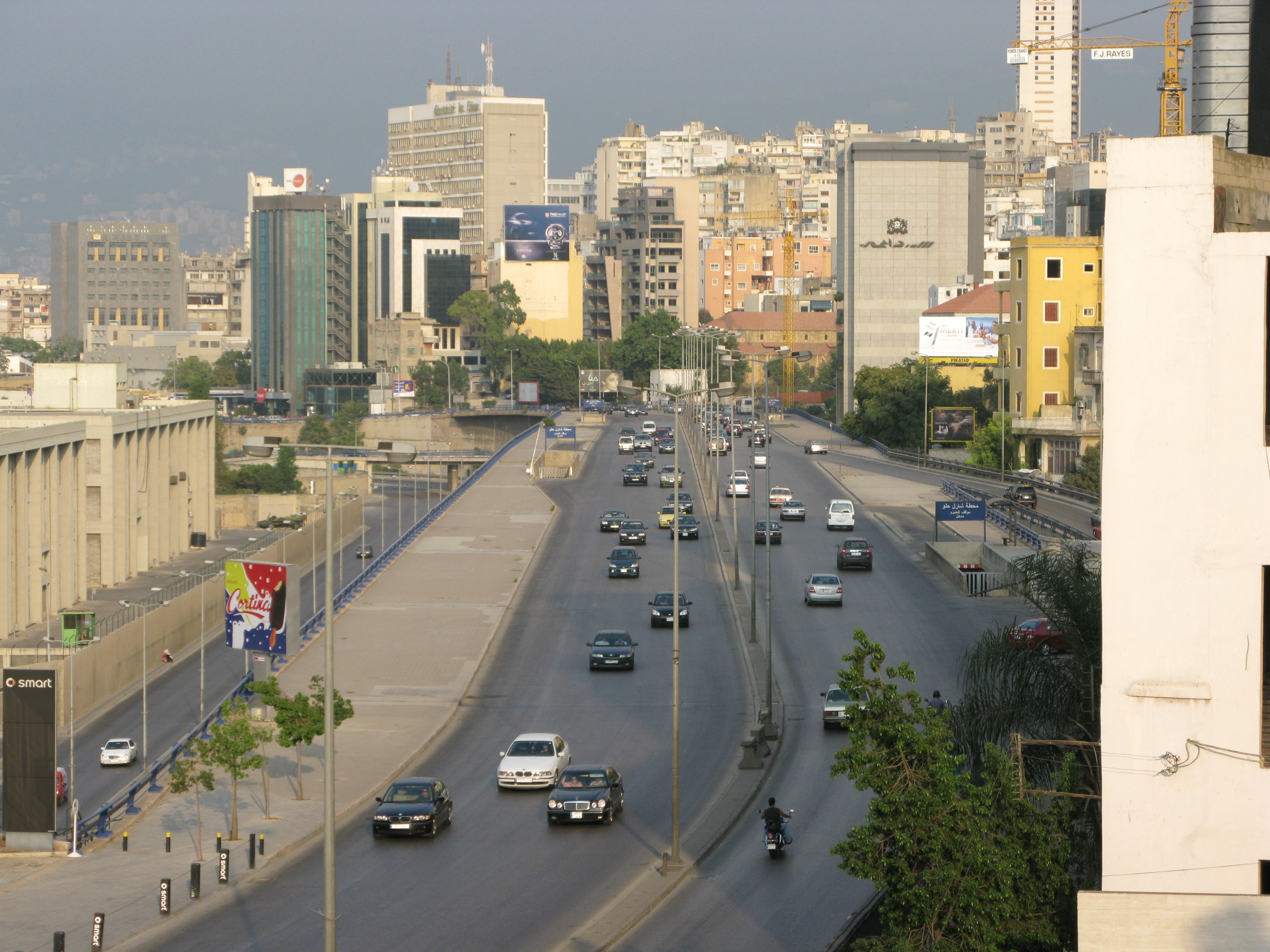
Central Beirut

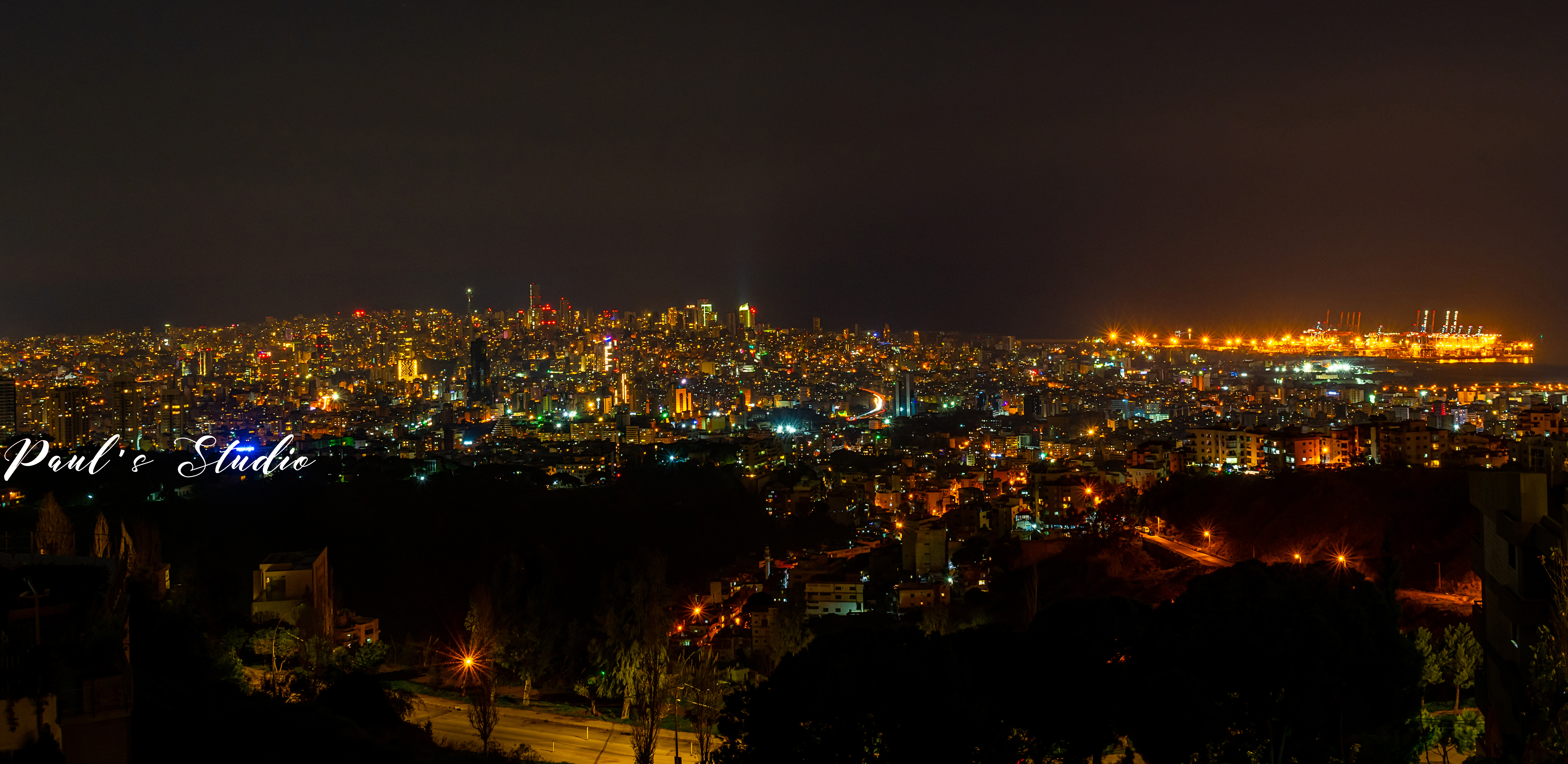
Beirut at night

== Twin towns and sister cities ==
Beirut is twinned with:

- Athens, Greece
- Los Angeles, United States
- Barcelona, Spain
- Rio de Janeiro, Brazil
- Paris, France
- Yerevan, Armenia
- Lusaka, Zambia

== Different historical spellings (1890) ==
1. Bairout (Beirut)
2. Bairouth (Beirut)
3. Bairut (Beirut)
4. Beiroot (Beirut)
5. Beirout (Beirut)
6. Beirouth (Beirut)
7. Berout. (Beirut)
8. Berut (Beirut)
9. Beyroot (Beirut)
10. Beyrout (Beirut)
11. Beyrouth (Beirut)

== See also ==
- Beirut International Exhibition & Leisure Center
- Beirut Heritage Trail.

== Bibliography ==
=== References ===
- Cohen, Getzel M. (2006). The Hellenistic Settlements in Syria, the Red Sea Basin, and North Africa. University of California Press. p. 205 – via Google Books (limited preview). LCCN 2005-15751; ISBN 978-0-5209-3102-2, 0-5209-3102-5.
- First Report of the United States Board on Geographic Names – 1890–1891. Contributor: Thomas Corwin Mendenhall (1841–1924). Government Printing Office. 1892. LCCN 04-18260.
1. "Names in Foreign Countries" → "Bairout" – "Beyrouth". pp. 43–44.
  1. Via HathiTrust (Michigan).
  2. Via Google Books (University of Zurich).
- Hall, Linda Jones (2004), Roman Berytus: Beirut in Late Antiquity.
- Head, Barclay; et al. (1911), "Phoenicia", Historia Numorum (2nd ed.), Oxford: Clarendon Press, pp. 788–801.
- Kassir, Samir (2003), Histoire de Beyrouth (in French), Fayard.
- Kassir, Samir (2010), Beirut, Berkeley: University of California Press.
- Mansel, Philip (2010), Levant: Splendour and Catastrophe on the Mediterranean, London: John Murray, ISBN 978-0-7195-6707-0.
- New York Times (The). LCCN sn78-4456, LCCN sn00-61556; ISSN 0362-4331, ISSN 1553-8095 (online); OCLC 1645522 (all editions).
1. Jehl, Douglas (23 February 1997). "Under Beirut's Rubble, Remnants of 5,000 Years of Civilization". Vol. 146, whole no. 50712. p. 15.
  1. Via NYTimes blog. ProQuest 2237383518 (blog ed., US Newsstream database).
  2. Pdf via TimesMachine (PDF).
  3. Permalink via TimesMachine.
  4. ProQuest 430735596 (print ed., US Newsstream database).
2. "At Beirut Protest, a Reminder of Religious Diversity". 19 December 2006. p. 10 (section A).
  1. Via NYTimes blog.
  2. ProQuest 433472921 (print ed., US Newsstream database).
3. Wise, Zach; Meek, Miki (10 January 2009). "The 44 Places to Go in 2009: 1. Beirut" (interactive graphic). Travel Section (weekend).
  1. Via NYTimes blog. Archived from the original on 22 April 2009.
4. Sherwood, Seth; Williams, Gisela (10 January 2009). "Where to Go – 2009: 1. Beirut". Travel Section (weekend).
  1. Via NYTimes blog.
  2. Print (Late; East Coast ed.) – Via ProQuest 434016195 (US Newsstream database).
- Shair, Kamal (1930–2008) (14 October 2006). Out of the Middle East: The Emergence of an Arab Global Business. I.B.Tauris. p. 3. LCCN 2006-298791, LCCN 2024-729221; ISBN 978-1-8451-1271-4, 1-8451-1271-7 (hardcover), ISBN 978-0-8577-1546-3; OCLC 65469831 (all editions).
1. Via Google Books (no preview). Archived from the original on 16 March 2024.
2. Via Google Books (limited preview).
- Talbert, Richard (2000), Barrington Atlas of the Greek and Roman World, Princeton University Press, p. 69, ISBN 0-691-03169-X.
