= List of Lebanese architects =

The following is a list of notable Lebanon architects in alphabetical order.

A

- Michel Abboud (born 1977)
- Youssef Aftimus (1866–1952)
- Mardiros Altounian (1888–1958)
- Amale Andraos (born 1973)

B

- Mikaella Boulos (born 1992)

D

- Nazih Dergham (born 1945)

E

- Ammar Eloueini (born 1968)

F

- Pierre Fakhoury (born 1943)

G

- Nabil Gholam (born 1962)
- Lina Ghotmeh (born 1980)

K

- Salim Al-Kadi
- Joseph Philippe Karam (1923–1976)
- Nadim Karam (born 1957)
- Bernard Khoury (born 1969)
- Pierre el-Khoury (1930–2005)

M

- Mariagroup
- Chadi Massaad (born 1959)

R

- Raëd Abillama Architects

S

- Hashim Sarkis (born 1964)

== See also ==
- Architecture of Lebanon
- List of architects
- List of Lebanese people
- Lebanon
