= Greek Orthodox Metropolitan of Beirut =

Head of Greek Orthodox Archdiocese

Greek Orthodox Metropolitan of Beirut and Exarch of Phoenicia is the head of the Greek Orthodox Archdiocese of Beirut and Exarchate of Phoenicia in the Syrian-based patriarchate of the Eastern Orthodox Church of Antioch. The present Archbishop is Elias Audi (1980-)

== List of Archbishops ==
- Makarios (1783 being mentioned)
- Archimandrite Messurah (appointed in 1902)
- Gerasimos Mesarra (?)
- Elias Saliby (1950 being mentioned)
- Elias Audi (1980–present)
