= Saint George Greek Orthodox Cathedral =

Orthodox church and museum in Beirut

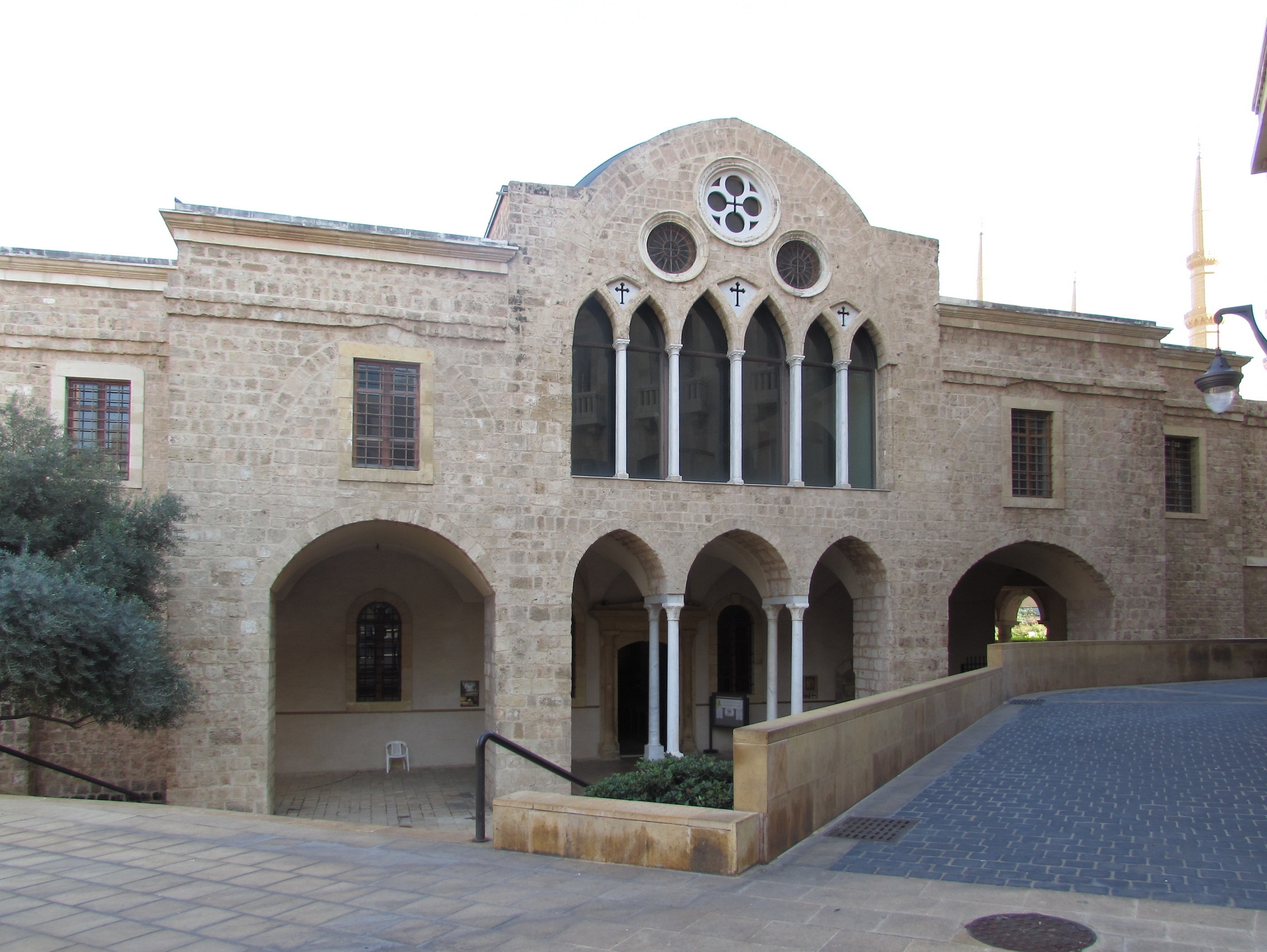
- View of the cathedral from Nejmeh Square

- The Cathedral shown within Beirut

Religion
- Affiliation: Greek Orthodox Church of Antioch
- Year consecrated: 1764
- Status: active

Location
- Location: Nejmeh Square, Beirut, Lebanon
- Coordinates: 33.896339°N 35.505141°E

Architecture
- Completed: 1772

Specifications
- Direction of façade: West
- Materials: Sandstone, marble, limestone

Saint George Greek Orthodox Cathedral (consecrated 1764, Arabic: كاتدرائية القديس جاورجيوس للروم الارثوذكس) is the seat of the Greek Orthodox Metropolitan bishop of the Greek Orthodox Archdiocese of Beirut and its dependencies. It is the city's oldest extant church: it has been built over the disappeared Anastasi Romano-Byzantine Cathedral.

== History ==
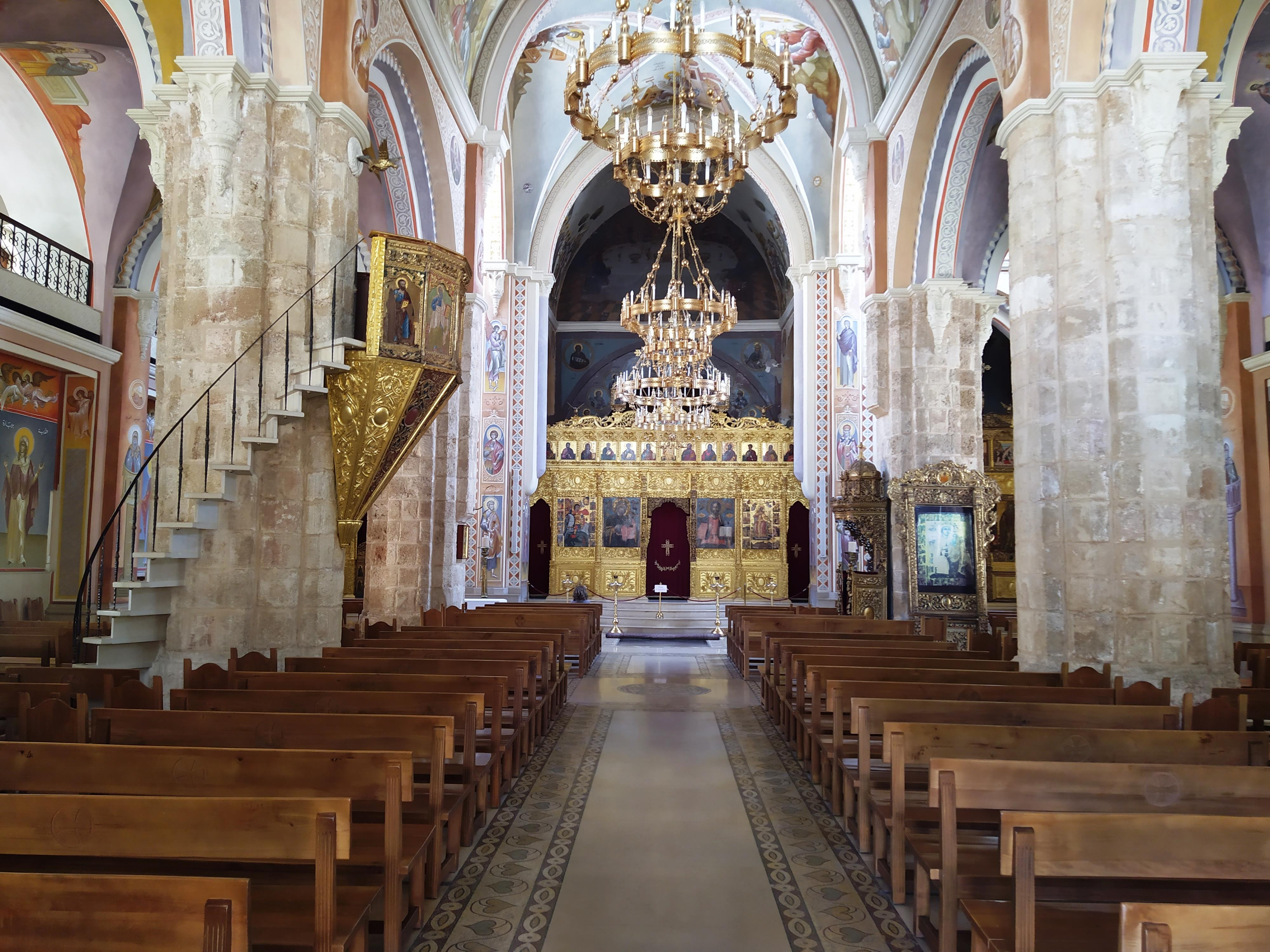
Interior of St. George Greek Orthodox Cathedral

The establishment of the Greek Orthodox Archdiocese of Beirut is attributed according to the Greek Orthodox tradition to the Apostle Quartus of Berytus, one of the Seventy disciples, who served as Beirut's first bishop. Byzantine emperor Theodosius II issued a decree c. 449 – c. 450 AD elevating the bishop of Beirut Efstathius to the rank of Metropolitan bishop. The city was until then a diocese of the Metropolis of Tyre.

The Anastasis cathedral was the first church to be built on the site of the Saint George cathedral. It was built by Efstathuis in the fifth century AD and bordered the auditoria of Beirut's Roman law school. The church influenced the teachings of the school as law scholars worked to reconcile the texts of Roman law and the teachings of Christianity as attested by Severus of Antioch, who visited the city in the fifth century AD.

In 551 AD a massive earthquake destroyed the whole of Beirut including the "Anastasis cathedral". In the 12th century a cathedral was built in the same location. The structure was badly damaged by a 1759 earthquake and was pulled down to be built anew. Construction started in 1764 and the new, larger structure, with one nave and a vaulted ceiling, was completed in 1767. However, the ceiling collapsed killing 90 people, due to the lack of supporting pillars. In 1772 the church was rebuilt on a cruciform plan with three naves, a new portico was added to the north facade, the main western facade was enlarged and a new bell-tower was built on the north-western corner.

In 1783 the cathedral underwent a series of modifications, including the addition of the narthex to the western facade and the enlargement of the apse to fit the central axis of the cathedral's main altar. That same year Younes al-Jbeily offered the church its ornate gilded wooden iconostasis.

The last modifications to the cathedral were made in 1910, with the addition of a vaulted portico to the south facade, the cathedral was further enlarged to the east and the bell tower was moved to the south-east corner. The interior of the cathedral was decorated with ornate frescoes offered by Ibrahim Youssef Saad.

In 1975, following the outbreak of the Lebanese civil war, the cathedral was shelled and vandalized and its elaborate frescoes were left to decay. Most of the icons and part of the iconostasis were stolen; parts of the 18th century iconsostasis were also set on fire. The excavations undertaken under the cathedral during 17 months in 1994–1995 covered 316 square metres (3,400 sq ft) and revealed many archaeological layers that allowed a historical timeline of the church and its surroundings to be constructed. On 10 October 1995 Metropolitan Elias Audi announced plans to restore the war-torn cathedral. The first phase of restoration began in 1998, under the supervision of a committee headed by Ghassan Tueni. The cathedral reopened its doors on 15 December 2003.

The cathedral was badly damaged in the Beirut explosions of 4 August 2020.

== The archaeological crypt museum ==
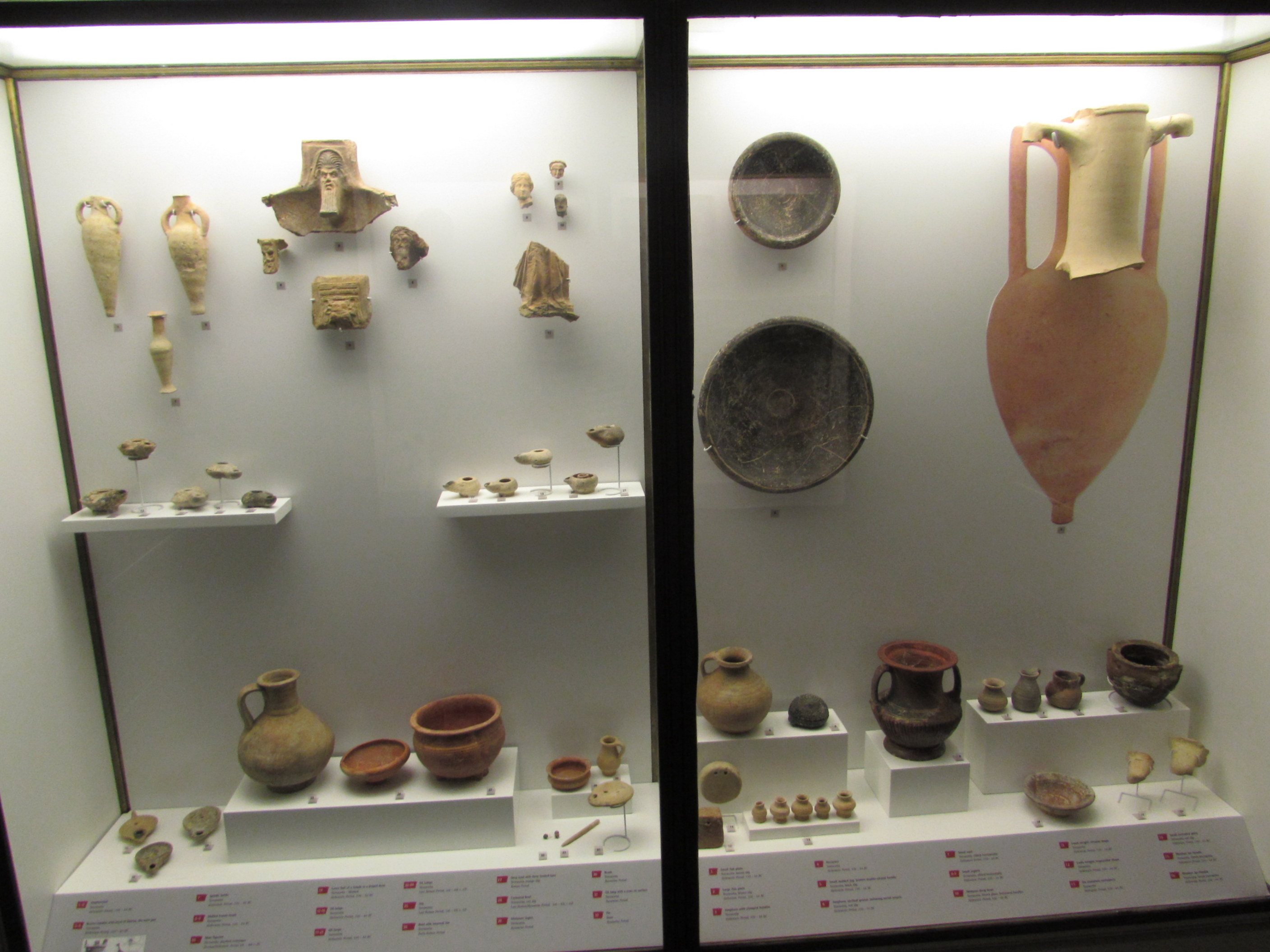
The archaeological museum in the crypt

In 1994, archaeological excavations undertaken within and in the vicinity of the Saint George cathedral before the initiation of restoration works unveiled a number of artifacts and vestiges spanning the Hellenistic, Roman, Byzantine, Medieval and Ottoman eras. The aim of the excavation was to locate the Byzantine Anastasis cathedral in relation to the standing cathedral and ultimately triangulate the location of the ancient Law School of Beirut. The excavations also revealed the sequence of continuous religious use of the site. A committee was formed under the patronage of the Greek Orthodox Archdiocese of Beirut to oversee the excavations and the creation of the Saint George archaeological crypt museum. The founding committee was headed by archaeologist Leila Bader who served as the director of the American University of Beirut Archaeological Museum and included Nabil Azar, Yasmine Macaron Bou Assaf, Katia Neeman Salha and Rita Kalindjian. The creation of the museum was funded by the Greek Orthodox Archdiocese of Beirut with a donation from the Jacques and Naila Saadé foundation. The museum was inaugurated on 3 December 2011.

The museum consists of a crypt running under a part of the cathedral where visitors walk through 12 stops showcasing the different archaeological and historical layers. The museum has a surface area of 250 square metres (2,700 sq ft), it is accessible through a breach in the cathedral's foundation wall and a stairwell built in front of the church's northern side. Towards the end of the circuit, the crypt opens up to a glass partition giving views to the cathedral's altar.

The display includes a number of finds such as oil lamps, smoking pipes, pottery, statuettes and Christian vessels and ornaments. Other vestiges kept in-situ include parts of the older churches' altars and apse, mosaics, stone engravings, tombstones and columns, some of which belong to the old city's Cardo maximus.

The excavated area also includes a necropolis where 25 burials were opened. The tombs were oriented on an east–west axis, with the head facing west. These graves consisted of a single sandstone course overlaid by large stone slabs. A large quantity of iron nails were uncovered in the necropolis suggesting the use of wooden coffins in the funeral customs. Among the uncovered tombs was a one containing the skeleton of a man wearing a bronze tiara, with an iron arrowhead and three bronze amulets placed over his chest.

== Gallery ==
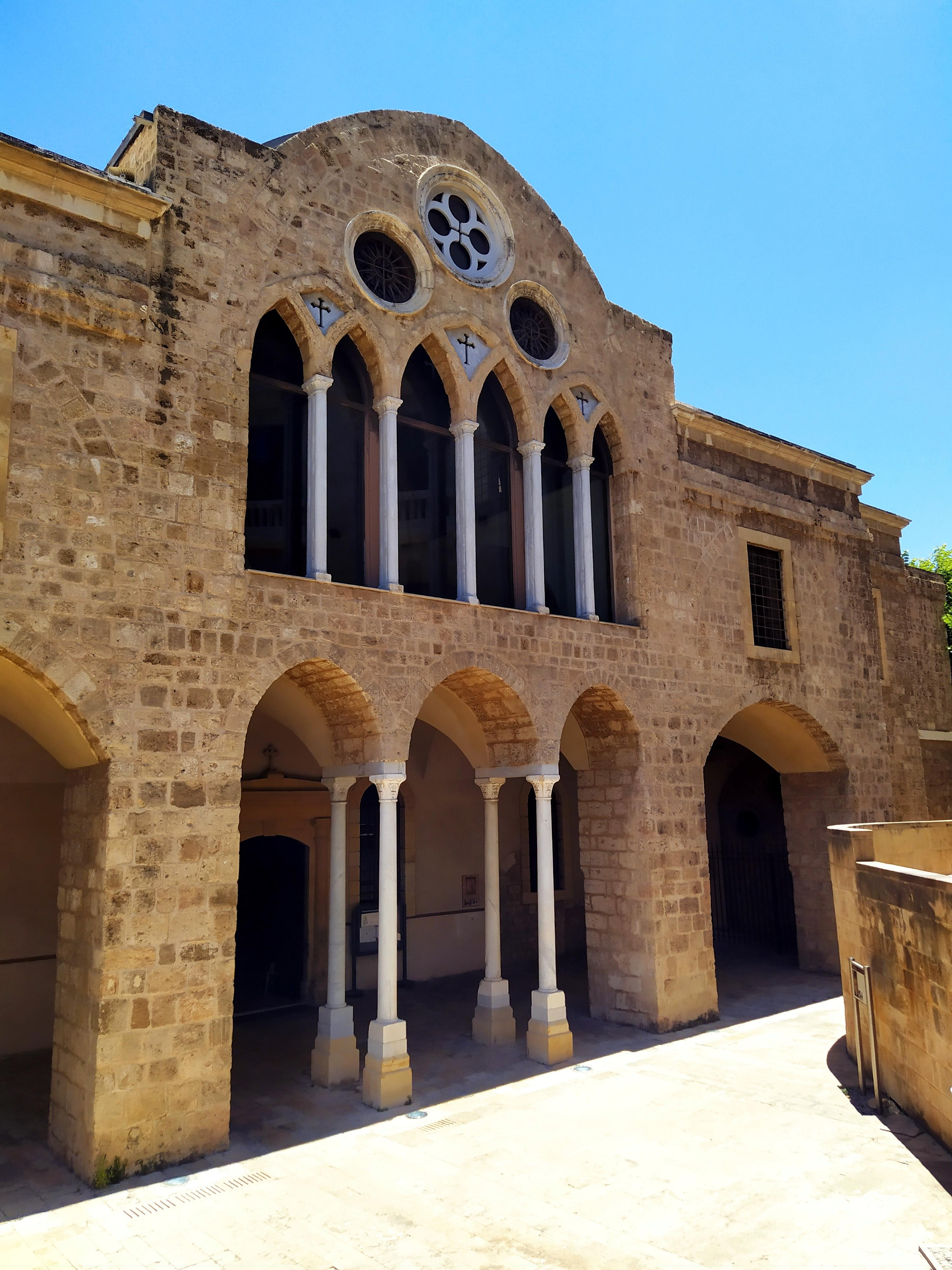
Main facade

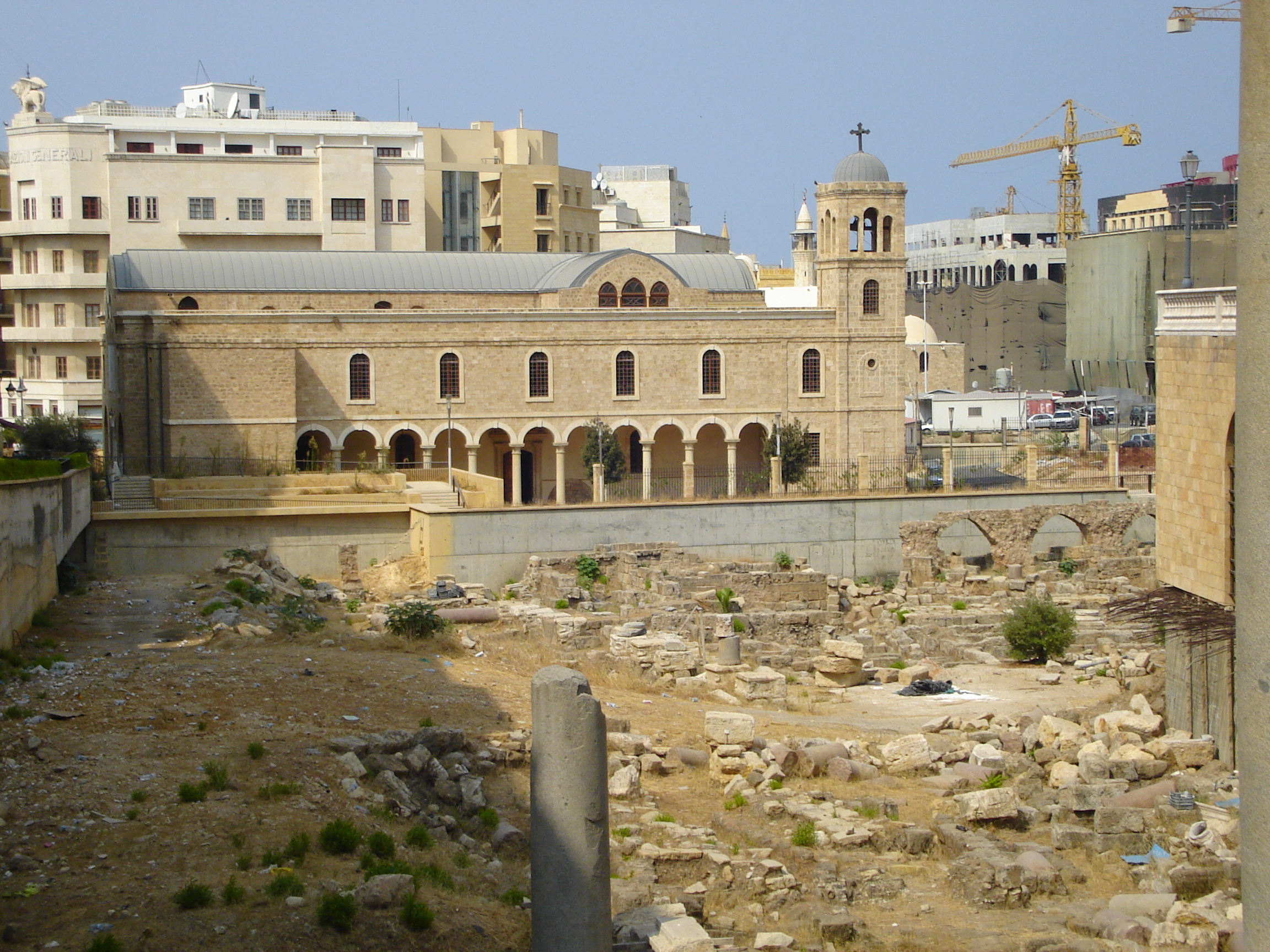
Viewed from the Roman Forum remains

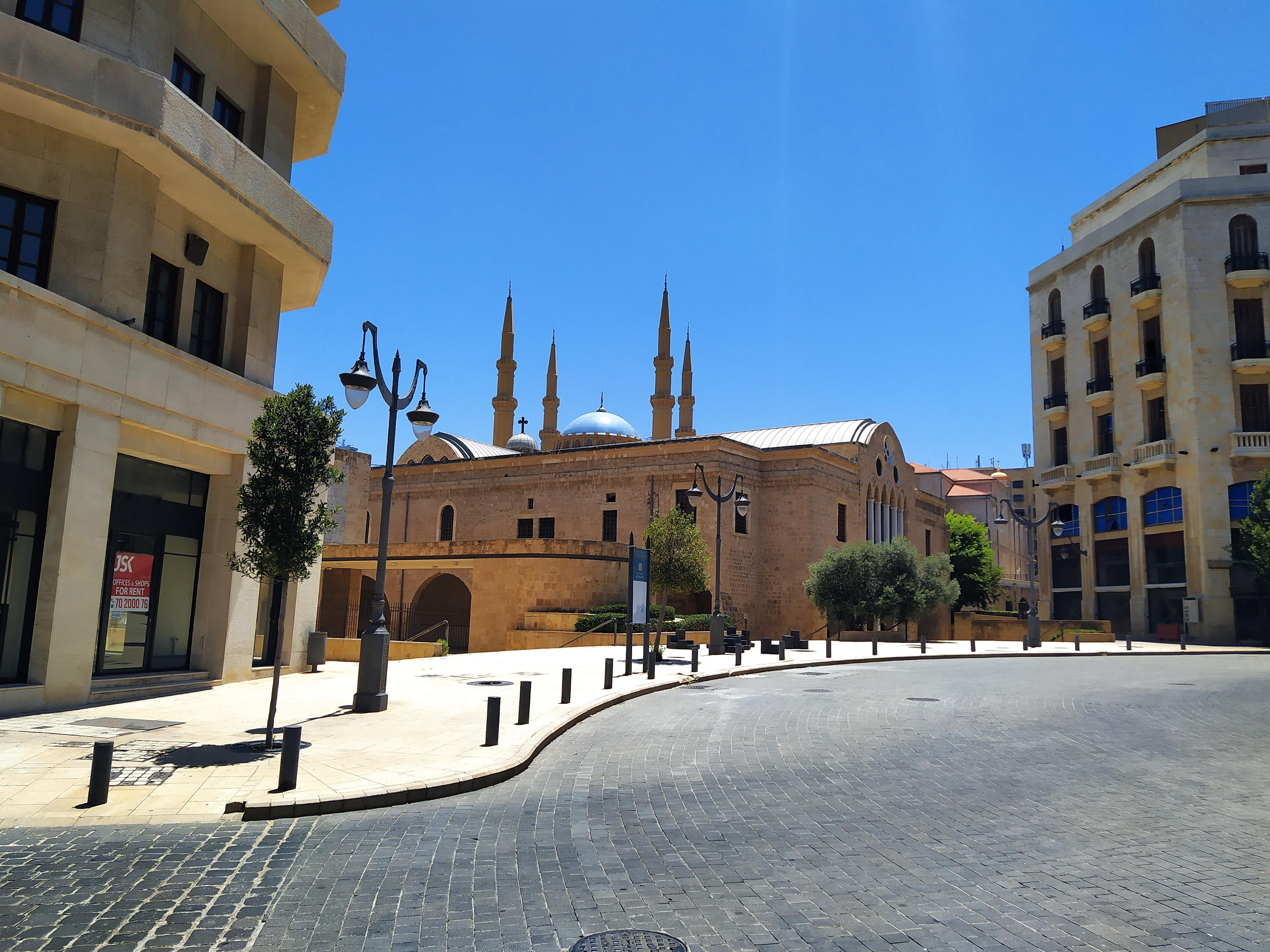
The cathedram from Nejmeh Square

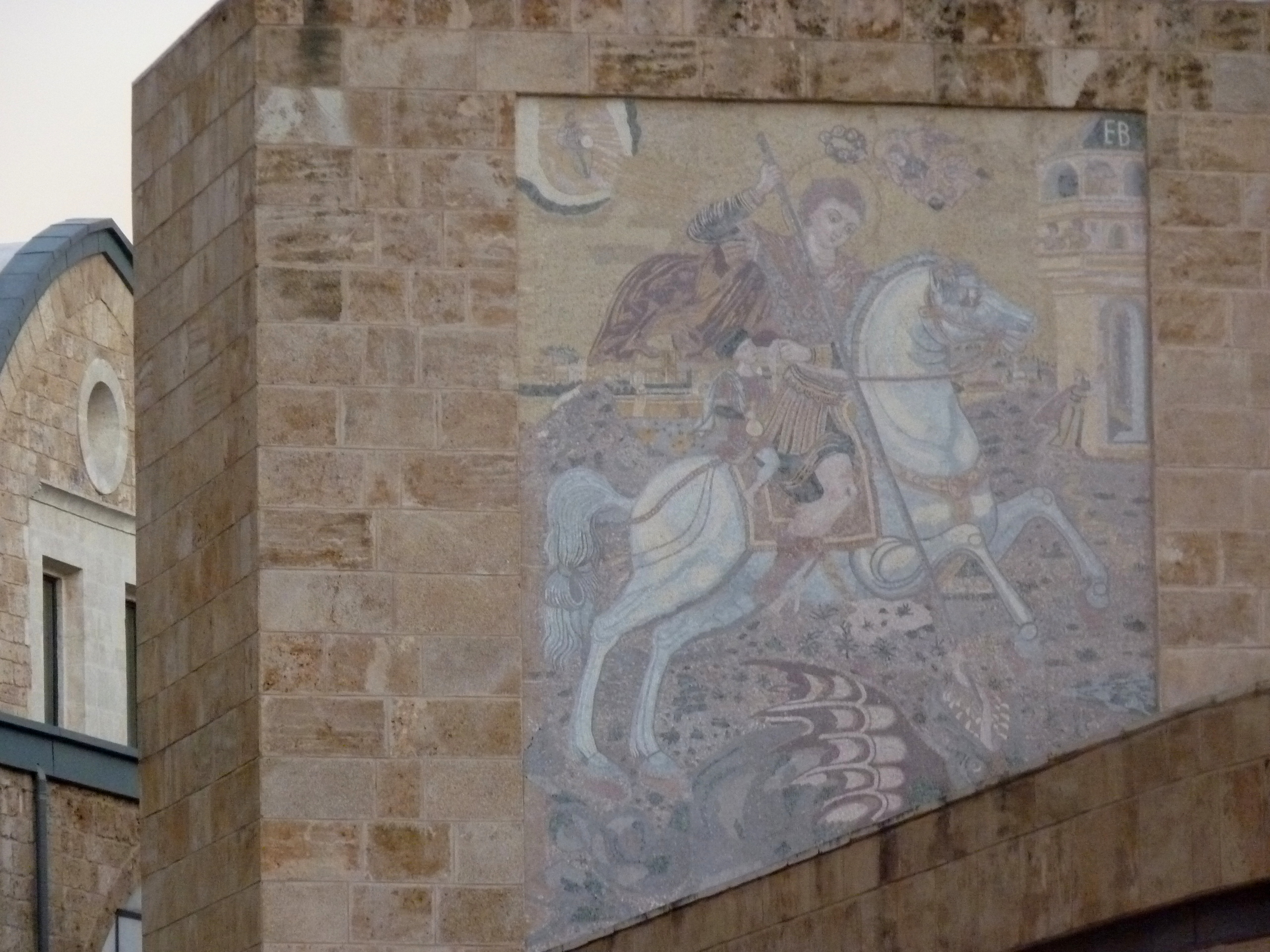
Mosaic by the entrance

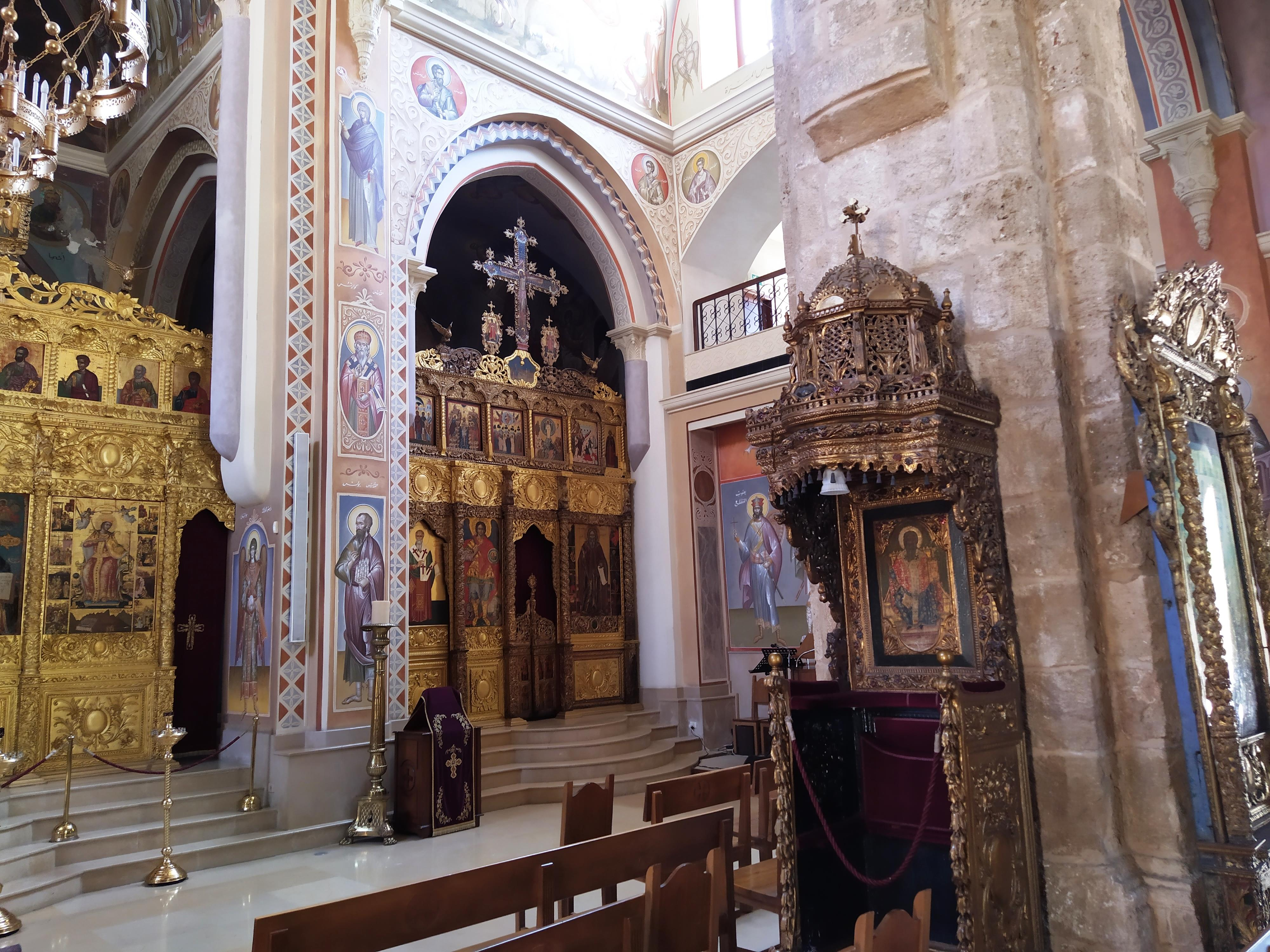
Interior

== See also ==
- Beirut Central District
- Eastern Orthodox Church
- Eastern Orthodox Christianity in Lebanon
- Christianity in Lebanon
- Saint George Maronite Cathedral, Beirut
- Sayyidat al-Nouriyyeh
