= Petit Serail =

Administrative building in Ottoman Beirut, destroyed in 1951

- السراي الصغير (Arabic)
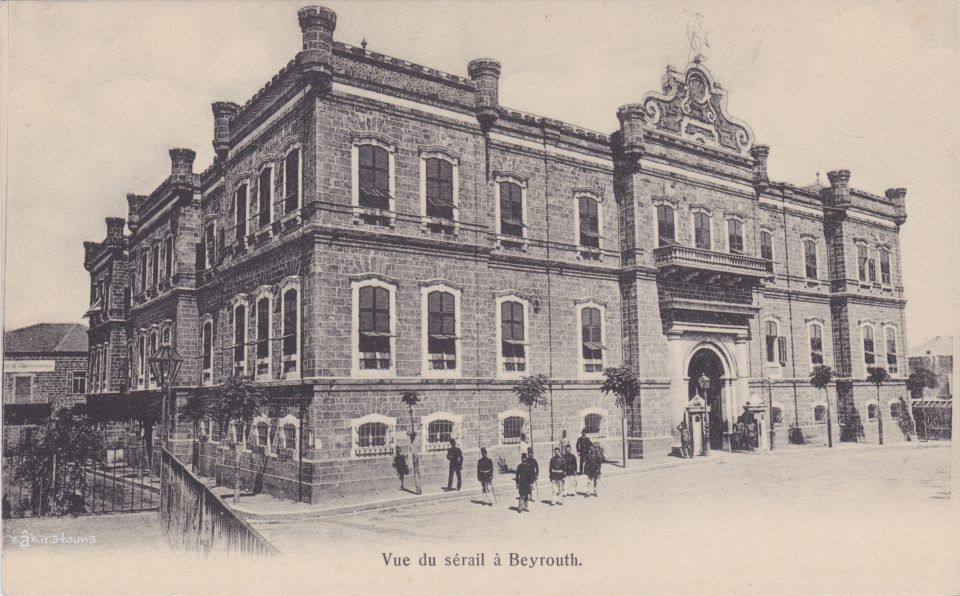
- The Petit Serail

- Location within Beirut Location within Lebanon
- 33.896991°N 35.507331°E
- Location: Beirut, Lebanon

History
- Built: 1881
- Built for: Ottoman administration

Site notes
- Architect(s): Bechara Effendi, Youssef Khayat
- Architectural style: Ottoman new order

The Petit Serail (Arabic: السراي الصغير / ALA-LC: as-sarāy as-ṣaghīr, literally “Little Saray”) was a historic Ottoman administrative building in Beirut that served as the seat of the wali of Syria and later of the Beirut Vilayet. It was located on the northern edge of Martyrs' Square in the heart of the Beirut Central District. The building was the site of significant political and administrative activity; however, plans to enlarge Beirut’s principal civic square ultimately led to its demolition in 1950. The Petit Serail formed part of a broader corpus of Ottoman-era construction projects that contributed to the development of the architecture of Lebanon in Beirut.

== Overview ==
Inaugurated in 1884, the Petit Serail functioned as the seat of Beirut’s governor general from 1888 and later accommodated the Lebanese government and presidency during the French Mandate. Although demolished in 1950, its foundations were rediscovered during archaeological excavations in the mid-1990s and subsequently preserved.

== Background ==
During the second half of the nineteenth century, local authorities in Beirut sought to relocate the seat of governance from the deteriorating Emir Assaf saray, also known as Dar al-Wilaya (House of the Vilayet). This medieval structure had been erected in 1572 by Mohammad Assaf, son of the Turkmen emir Mansour Assaf. On 11 September 1840, Beirut was bombarded by the British fleet during operations to expel the forces of Ibrahim Pasha, resulting in substantial damage to the old saray. The building was restored in 1843 under the governorship of Assaad Mukhles Pasha. In 1882, the administrative council of the Sanjak of Beirut resolved to construct a new seat of government and offered the Emir Assaf Saray for sale. The property was auctioned in April 1882, first to Mohammad Ayyas and subsequently to members of the Sursock and Tueini families. The old saray was demolished and replaced by the Sursock souks, while construction proceeded on the new administrative complex that became known as the “Petit Serail,” so named to distinguish it from the Kışla-i Hümayun (Ottoman barracks), more commonly referred to as the Grand Serail.

== History ==
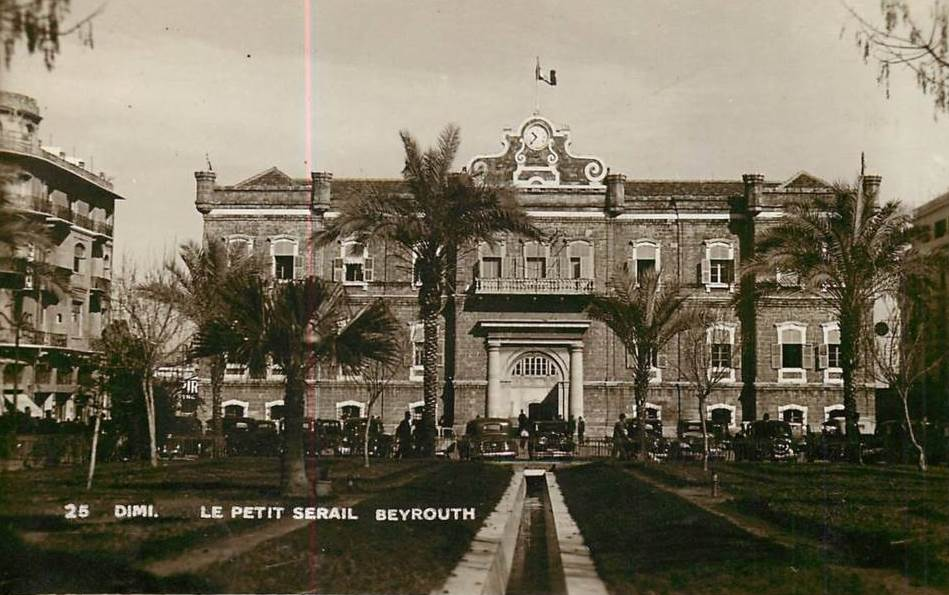
The Petit Serail under French rule

The Petit Serail was conceived as a civic centre in accordance with the Tanzimat reforms and the Beirut Municipality’s urban development plan of 1878. The northern edge of Sahet el-Bourj was selected for its strategic position at the core of the expanding extramural city. Commissioned by Beirut’s mayor Ibrahim Fakhri Bey, construction commenced in 1881 on the site of an earlier saray ordered demolished by the wali Hamdi Pasha. The building was executed by Bechara Effendi Avedissian, chief engineer of the Vilayet of Syria, and Youssef Effendi Khayat, engineer of the city of Beirut. The project encountered financial constraints, as evidenced by correspondence between the wali of Syria, Ahmad Hamdi Pasha, and the Porte. To finance the works and equip the offices, Hamdi Pasha secured a loan from the Ottoman Bank, mortgaged public properties, and imposed additional taxes. In 1883, a public garden was inaugurated in the square facing the Serail. Named the “Hamidie” in honour of Sultan Abdul Hamid II, it was more commonly known as the Menshieh garden. The Petit Serail was formally inaugurated in 1884, three years after construction began.

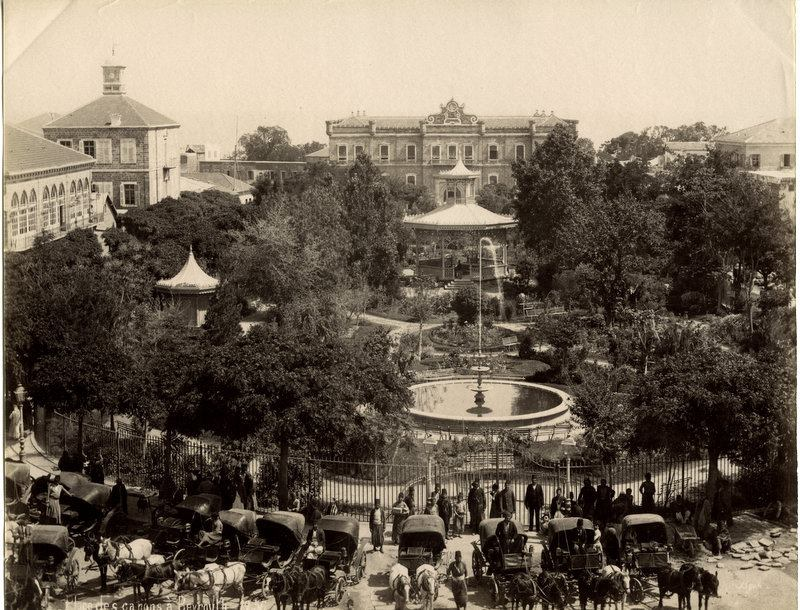
The Petit Serail and the square

Under the French Mandate, the urban planner De La Halle proposed the enlargement of al-Bourj Square and the construction of a new governmental complex. His 1939 plan envisaged the demolition of the Petit Serail to open visual and physical access between the square and the waterfront through a series of landscaped terraces. Although the proposal was formulated during the Mandate period, the demolition was carried out only in 1950, following Lebanon’s independence. The projected clearing of the square was subsequently abandoned, and the Regent Hotel and the Rivoli building were erected on the site in 1953. In the 1990s, Solidere demolished both structures, and archaeological excavations revealed the foundations of the Petit Serail. These remains are slated for preservation within the planned underground Beirut City History Museum.

== Function ==
The Petit Serail was constructed to serve as the seat of the Vilayet of Syria and housed municipal and provincial institutions, including Beirut’s judicial court. In 1888, when Beirut was elevated to the status of provincial capital of the Beirut Vilayet, the building became the official residence of the wali. Under Wali Azmi Bey, the provincial seat was transferred to the Grand Serail, while municipal departments and the telegraph service were relocated to the Petit Serail.

== Architecture ==
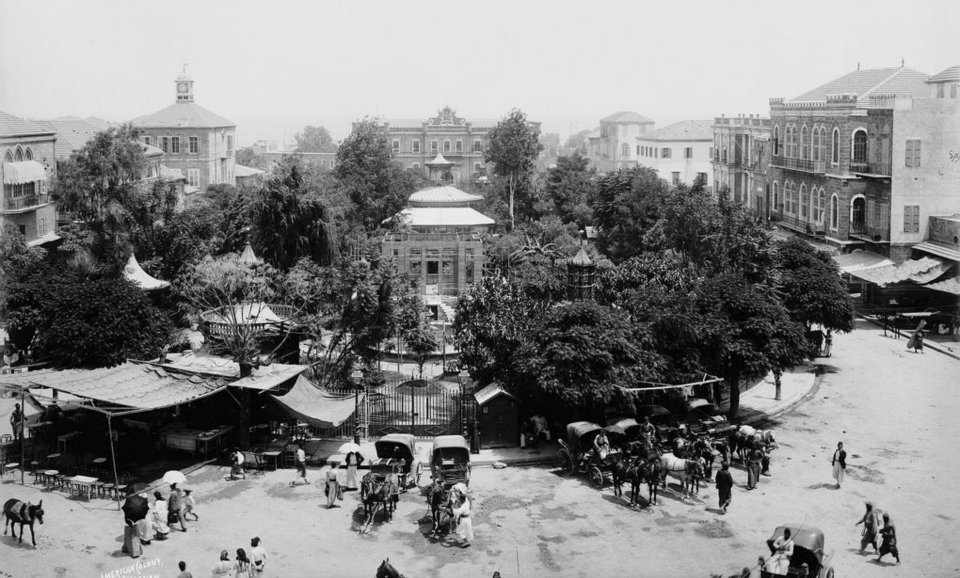
Sahet al-Bourj and the Petit Serail in the background.

The Petit Serail was designed in an eclectic occidentalist idiom that combined baroque elements with more restrained architectural features, a style characteristic of nineteenth-century Ottoman public buildings. The two-storey structure was elevated on a plinth, enhancing its monumentality. Its oblong sandstone façade was articulated with neo-baroque windows and decorative motifs. The principal entrance, framed by an imposing marble portal, opened onto a central courtyard and provided access to the building’s interior levels. A crenelated cornice extended along the roofline, punctuated by bartizans at the corners, evoking the silhouette of medieval European fortifications. The central axis of the main façade was emphasised by a prominent ornamental gable adorned with volutes surrounding a clock. The building covered an area of approximately 3,500 square cubits and comprised nearly 80 rooms.

== Timeline ==
- 1878: Municipal plan for the modernisation of Sahat al-Burj (later Martyrs' Square).
- 1881: Authorisation granted by Ottoman authorities for the construction of the Serail.
- 1888: The Serail became the seat of the wali.
- French Mandate: The seat of authority was transferred to the Grand Serail on Serail Hill; the Petit Serail accommodated the Lebanese president and government.
- 1950: Demolition of the Petit Serail in connection with plans to link Martyrs' Square to the seafront.
- 1950s: Construction of the Rivoli Cinema.
- Mid-1990s: Rediscovery and preservation of the Petit Serail’s foundations.

== See also ==
- Beirut Central District
- Grand Serail
- Manouk Avedissian
- Serail Hill
- Martyrs' Square
- Martyrs' Monument
