= Sayyidat al-Nouriyyeh =

Church in downtown Beirut, Lebanon

Sayyidat al-Nouriyyeh (Arabic: سيدة النورية) is a church in Beirut, Lebanon.

== History ==
An old shrine dedicated to the Virgin Mary was in a room on the ground floor of a building in Souk al-Nouriyyeh, to the east of the Saint George Orthodox Cathedral. A vaulted entrance led to the shrine by way of a tiny intervening room. Sayyidat al-Nouriyyeh (Our Lady of Light) was believed to be a light that guided sailors and fishermen to safety. The shrine was adorned with three icons: one of Christ, one of all the saints, and one of the Virgin Mary, reputed to be miraculous. Sayyidat al-Nouriyyeh was widely visited by both Christian and Muslim inhabitants of Beirut.

During the 1975-1990 Lebanese Civil War the shrine was burnt, looted and later completely destroyed, replaced in 2003 by the existing chapel.
