= Assem Salam =

Lebanese Civil Engineer and Author

- Born: 1924; Beirut, Lebanon
- Died: 5 November 2012
- Occupations: Architect, Engineer, Politician

Assem Salam (1924 – 5 November 2012); (عاصم سلام) was a Lebanese civil engineer, architect and author. He graduated from the University of Cambridge in 1950. Asem used patterns and shapes from the Islamic tradition in his works.

== Education ==
Graduated from the University of Cambridge, England, with a degree in Architecture, in 1950.

== Career ==
- Designed the Saray of Sidon (1965)
- Designed the Khashoggi Mosque in the Horsh Beirut neighborhood (1968)
- Designed the dormitories for Broumana High School (1966)

== Positions and Roles ==
- He held the position of member of the Higher Planning Council within the Ministry of Planning between 1961 and 1977.
- He was a member of the Higher Urban Planning Council (1964–1986), and a member of the Council for Development and Reconstruction (1977–1983).
- He was a member of the Reconstruction Committee of the commercial city center of Beirut (1977–1986).

== Selected writings ==
Shared with others

- Emaar Beirut – The Missed Opportunity (1992)

Single production

- The Beirut Emaar Methodology – Preliminary research into the right paths and suggested alternatives (1995)
- Reconstruction and the Public Interest – In Architecture and the City (1995)

== See also ==
- Mardiros Altounian
- Ammar Khammash
- list of Lebanese architects
