= Manouk Avedissian =

Ottoman engineer

Manouk Avedissian (1841–1925), more commonly known as Bechara Effendi (or Bechara Effendi al-Muhandis, Bechara Afandi, also Bechara Effendi el-Dob "the bear") was an Ottoman administrator and the chief engineer of the Vilayet of Syria and later of the Vilayet of Beirut. Avedissian, who is considered one of the founding fathers of Lebanese architecture and urban planning, is of Armenian descent.

== Works ==
In 1887, Bechara Effendi was dispatched by order from the Porte to assist with the excavations conducted by Osman Hamdi Bey and Yervant Voskan at the necropolis near Sidon, Lebanon which unearthed the Alexander Sarcophagus among other artifacts. He is credited with discovering new burial chambers and with devising transport mechanisms and superintending the transit of the massive troves to a frigate bound for Constantinople's museum.

His works marked the landscape of Beirut with governmental buildings and monuments. Some of his work include the Petit Serail, the Sanayeh school complex, the Ottoman Bank in Beirut. Avedisian worked closely with Youssef Aftimus who married his daughter Rose in 1899.
