= Workshop Kitchen + Bar =

- Interactive map of Workshop Kitchen + Bar

Restaurant information
- Owner: Joseph Mourani
- Chef: Michael Beckman
- Food type: New American
- Location: 800 N. Palm Canyon Dr. Suite G, Palm Springs, California, 92262, United States
- Coordinates: 33°50′03″N 116°32′47″W

Workshop kitchen + bar or simply workshop is a restaurant and bar located in Palm Springs, California. The restaurant got media coverage due its architecture designed by SOMA, a New York City based firm. The restaurant is owned by Michael Beckman and Joseph Mourani.

The Michelin Guide has described the cuisine as Californian, and Fodor's says the menu is American. The restaurant has served octopus carpaccio and duck leg confit.

== See also ==
- List of New American restaurants
