= Pierre el-Khoury =

Lebanese architect

Pierre El Khoury
- Born: 1930; Lebanon
- Died: 2005 (aged 74–75); Beirut, Lebanon
- Education: Beaux-Arts de Paris, Paris, France
- Occupation: Architect
- Buildings: National Museum of Beirut, ESCWA
- Projects: BelHorizon, Our Lady of Lebanon

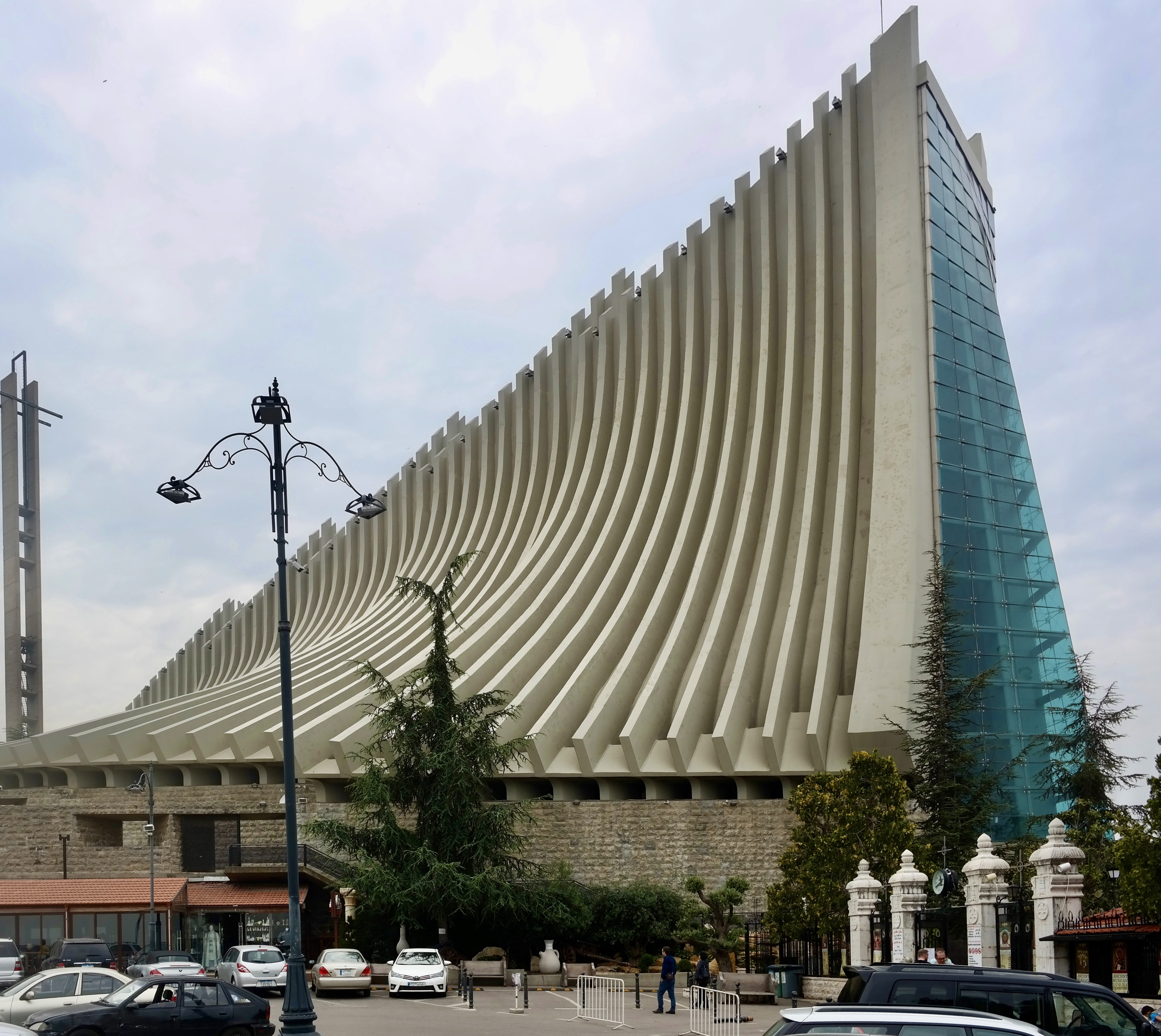
The Maronite basilica in Harissa

Pierre el-Khoury (1930–2005), known as "Sheikh Pierre", was a prolific architect from Lebanon. He studied at École des Beaux-Arts, returned to Lebanon and designed more than 200 projects including Burj Al Ghazal Tower and Moritra residential building

He helped restore several houses in Baadarâne, Aley, and Aramoun and helped renovate a palace in Beit ed-Dine into a hotel with Amin Bizri in 1965. He worked with many younger architects including Kamal Homsi, Jacques Abou Khaled, Semaan Khoury, Pierre Bassil, Joseph Faysal, Antoine Gemayel, Joe Geitani, and Tarek Zeidan.

He died of bone cancer in Beirut.

== Works ==
- el-Khoury residence in Yarze (1959)
- Clarisses Sisters Convent in Yarze (1960)
- Monastery near Jezzine
- Penitentiary complex for the Roumieh Prison
- Basilica" at Our Lady of Harissa overlooking Jounieh Bay (with Noel Abouhamad)
- Lebanese Pavilion at the New York Fair (1963) with Assem Salam and Michel Harmouch
- Byblos Center (1960) with Henri Edde
- Beirut Airport extension with Assaad Raad
- Sabbagh Center with Alvar Aalto and Alfred Roth

== See also ==
- Architecture of Lebanon
