= SOMA (architects) =

Firm of architects

Soma Architects
- Company type: Architectural practice
- Industry: architecture, urbanism, interior design, landscape design, research and development
- Founded: 2004
- Headquarters: Dubai, New York City & Beirut
- Key people: Michel Abboud (Founder and Creative Partner)
- Number of employees: 30
- Website: www.soma.us

SOMA is a New York–based firm of architects founded in 2004, with a portfolio and expertise in refurbishment and sustainability. In 2009, it opened another office in Beirut, Lebanon, where the principal and founder Michel Abboud, was born. SOMA’s work, mainly in New York City, Dubai, Qatar, Erbil, and Lebanon, covers projects across several industries.

SOMA architects designed the controversial Park51 Islamic Cultural Center in Manhattan, New York, dubbed the "Ground Zero mosque", the designs to which they unveiled in October 2010. The firm was awarded first place in the ‘Best Restaurant and Bar Design in the Americas’ category in the international 2013 Restaurant & Bar Design Awards in 2013. ‘Workshop Kitchen + Bar’ is located in Palm Springs, California.

SOMA's portfolio contains several residential projects, such as the 50 Lispenard, luxury residential lofts in the Tribeca neighborhood, and 93 Crosby lofts in the SoHo neighborhood both located in New York. The practice is currently exploring expansion of its activities into the Middle East, having several projects underway abroad, such as the upcoming Shaza Kempinski in Doha, Qatar. A mega project in Erbil, Kurdistan, named Aura, consists of a city centre, and rises high amidst the dry desert that surrounds it.

== Founding director ==
Michel Abboud, the founding director and principal of SOMA, provides overall design direction for all of the firm’s projects. He plays a major role in many aspects of the design and construction industry, including research projects, and professional committees.
