= Nejmeh Square =

- Square
- Place de l'Étoile
- ساحة النجمة
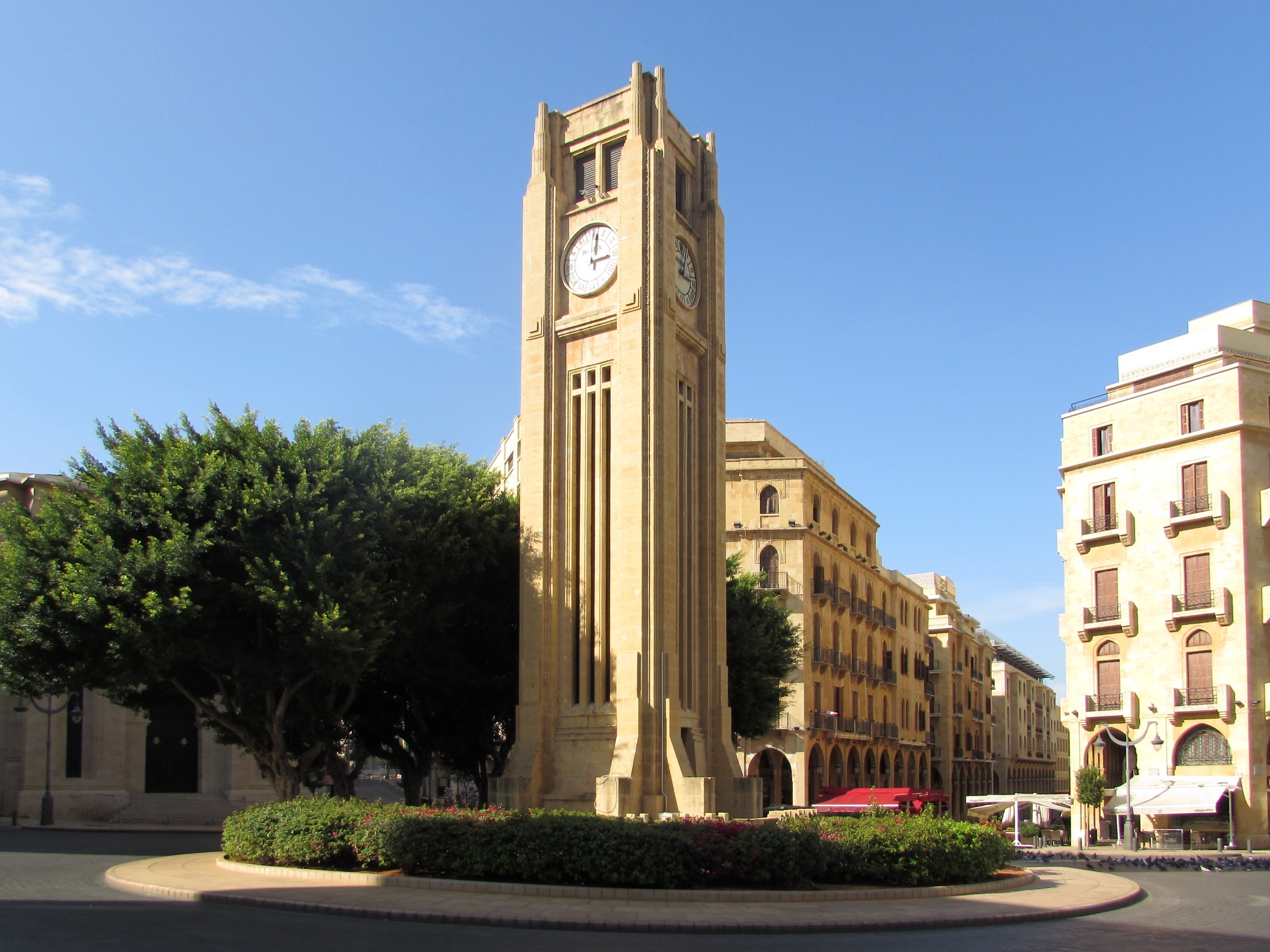
- The Clock Tower center of Nejmeh Square
- Area: 2.245 square kilometres (0.867 sq mi)
- Location: Beirut Municipality, Lebanon
- Interactive map of Nejmeh Square
- Coordinates: 33°53′48.04″N 35°30′16.34″E

Nejmeh Square (Arabic: ساحة النجمة, romanized: Sāḥat al-Najmah) or Place de l'Étoile is the central square in the Downtown area of Beirut, Lebanon. It is home to the Lebanese Parliament and its complementary buildings, two cathedrals, a museum, and several cafes and restaurants. Most notable for its Art Deco architecture, the square has become a recognizable icon of the city of Beirut worldwide.

== History ==
The square was developed in the 1920s when the French decided to destroy the old souks and open streets and transformed it into a modern district.

New Year's celebrations in 2019 were ranked in the top 10 in the world by National Geographic magazine.

During the 17 October Revolution, the square was the site of many protests and riots. Protesters clashed with security forces on 15 December 2019 for the second night in a row near Nejmeh Square. According to the Lebanese Civil Defense, 46 people were treated for injuries and another 14 were hospitalized. A group of counter-protesters, themselves supporters of Amal and Hezbollah, also briefly clashed with protesters until the army intervened.

== Sites ==
=== Saint George Greek Orthodox Cathedral ===
The Greek Orthodox Cathedral of Saint George, completed in 1772, is located directly on Nejmeh Square and is the oldest orthodox church in Beirut. Its location is believed to be directly adjacent to the site of the ancient Roman law school of Beirut. The church underwent several restorations in its history due to natural disasters, erosion, and intentional destruction. During the Lebanese Civil War, the church was burned and destroyed with most of its belongings stolen. The Greek Orthodox Archdiocese of Beirut began its renovation on October 16, 1995. The excavation at the site led to the discovery of the remains of three other churches and part of the Roman colonnades. These artifacts were incorporated into an underground museum directly located below the cathedral.

=== Al-Abed Clock Tower ===
The jewel of the square is the 1930s Al-Abed Clock Tower with its four-faced Rolex clock. The clock tower was a gift from Lebanese-Brazilian émigré Michel Abed. The square is also known for its noticeable population of pigeons.

=== Lebanese Parliament ===
The Parliament building was designed by Mardiros Altounian, who was also the architect of the Al-Abed Clock Tower. The building was completed in 1934 during the French Mandate period. Advised to build in the spirit of Lebanese tradition, the architect visited the Emirs' palaces in the Chouf Mountains. He also drew inspiration from the Oriental styles developed in Paris, Istanbul and Cairo at the turn of the 20th century. The building combines Beaux-Arts architecture with elements taken from local architectural tradition, including twin and triple arch windows. The limestone façade, decorated with recessed panels, arched openings, and tiers of stalactites, clads a reinforced concrete frame that also supports the 20-meter (66 ft) diameter cupola covering the Chamber of Deputies.
