= Greek Orthodox Archdiocese of Beirut =

Christian metropolitan see

Greek Orthodox Archdiocese of Beirut مطرانية الروم الأرثوذكس في بيروت

Location
- Country: Lebanon
- Territory: Beirut, Souk El Gharb
- Ecclesiastical province: Archdiocese of Beirut
- Metropolitan: Beirut, Lebanon

Statistics
- Parishes: 11

Information
- Denomination: Greek Orthodoxy
- Rite: Greek Orthodoxy
- Cathedral: Saint George Greek Orthodox Cathedral
- Patron saint: St. George
- Secular priests: 18

Current leadership
- Metropolitan: Elias Audi; Metropolitan of Beirut

Website
- Official website

The Greek Orthodox Archdiocese of Beirut (Arabic: مطرانية الروم الأرثوذكس في بيروت) is one of the twenty two archdioceses of the Greek Orthodox Church of Antioch. The establishment of the Archdiocese of Beirut is attributed by tradition to the Apostle Quartus, one of the Seventy Apostles. The area within the archdiocese has varied through the centuries as the Eastern Orthodox population changed. At different times the area of Mount Lebanon has been part of the Archdiocese of Beirut.

The diocese includes the area of the Lebanese capital, Beirut, and the town of Souk El Gharb and consists of eleven parishes and two women's monastic communities. The diocese is served by eighteen priests and four deacons.

In addition to its religious structure, the archdiocese supports a social structure that includes the 300-bed general hospital, St. George Hospital, that was founded in 1878, a nursing home for the elderly, and three dispensaries. These social and educational services are provided to the Lebanese population regardless of their religious, racial, or ethnic status.

The choir of Beirut led by Marcél Khourie provide for the daily offices and celebrations of the Mass at the church.

== See also ==
- Eastern Orthodoxy in Lebanon

== Sources ==
- Orthodox Archdiocese of Beirut (Official site)
