= Elias Audi =

Greek Orthodox Metropolitan of Beirut

His Eminence Elias
- Metropolitan of Beirut
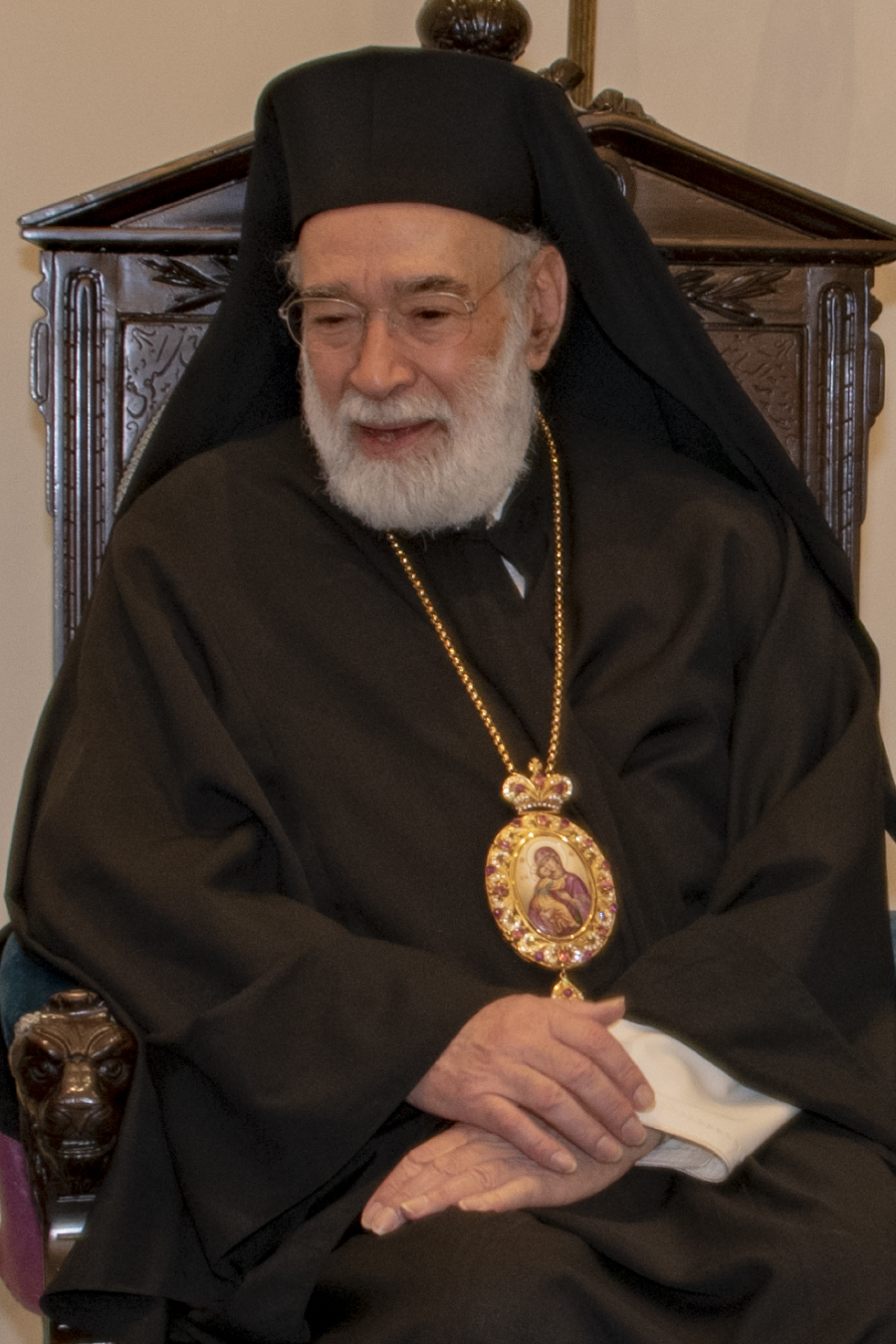
- Metropolitan Audi in 2019
- Archdiocese: Antioch
- See: Beirut
- Elected: February 5, 1980
- Installed: April 9, 1980
- Term ended: Incumbent

Orders
- Ordination: 1969

Personal details
- Born: Elias Audi; 1941 (age 84–85) Anfeh, El-Koura, Lebanon
- Denomination: Greek Orthodox
- Education: University of Balamand; Saint Vladimir's Orthodox Theological Seminary

Metropolitan Elias Audi (Note: Arabic: المتروبوليت إلياس عوده, romanized: almitrubulit 'iilyas eawadah) (born 1941, Enfeh, Koura) is the current Metropolitan bishop of the Greek Orthodox Church of Antioch for the Archdiocese of Beirut in Lebanon since 1980.

== Biography ==
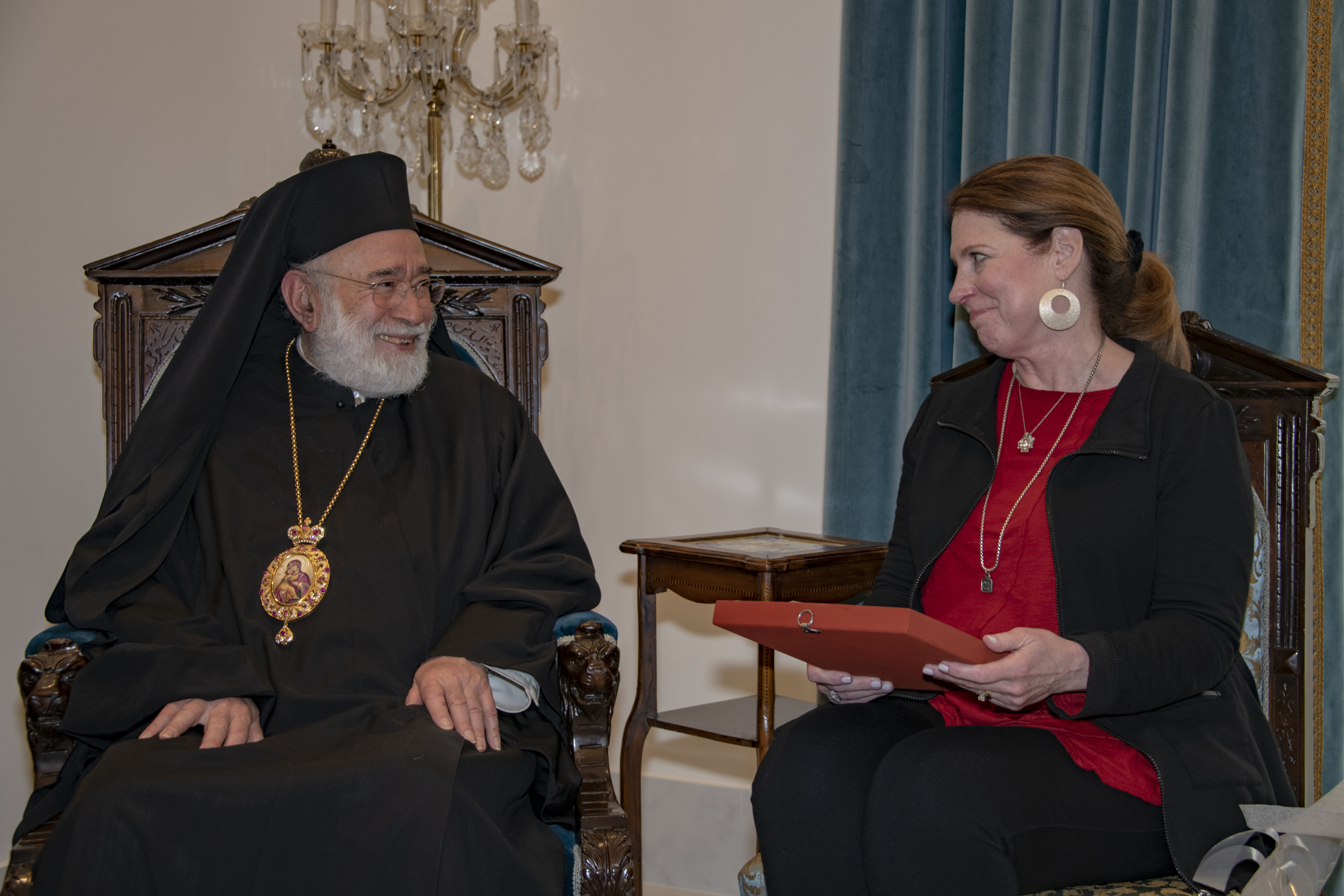
Metropolitan Audi with Susan Pompeo in 2019

Audi was born in 1941, in the predominantly Eastern Orthodox village of Anfeh, El-Koura, north Lebanon. He has a Bachelor of Arts in philosophy from Lebanon and a Bachelor of Arts in theology from Saint Vladimir's Orthodox Theological Seminary, New York, in 1969.

In 1969, he was ordained to the priesthood. In 1979, he was elected Greek Orthodox Archbishop of Beirut and appointed Patriarchal Vicar. He was elected by the Holy Antiochian Council on 5 February 1980. On 9 April 1980, he arrived to the Orthodox Archdiocese of Beirut in Achrafieh to assume his post.

In 2001, he attended a delegation held by the World Council of Churches in expressing solidarity after the September 11 attacks. In May 2002 he launched a new development project for Saint George Hospital University Medical Center in Beirut aimed at opening a trauma center and a children's hospital.

== Notes ==
Eastern Orthodox Church titles
Preceded by ?	Metropolitan of Beirut; 1980–present	Succeeded by Incumbent
