= Mariagroup =

Multinational architecture and design firm

MariaGroup
- Company type: Design studio
- Industry: Architecture, Interior design
- Founded: 1999
- Founders: Michèle Maria Chaya, Georges Maria
- Headquarters: Beirut, Lebanon
- Services: Architectural design, Interior design
- Website: www.mariagroup.com

MariaGroup is an architecture and design studio led by brother and sister duo Michèle Maria Chaya and Georges Maria. MariaGroup is known for its work in the fields of architecture, interior design, and furniture design.

== History ==
MariaGroup was established in 1999 in Beirut, Lebanon, by Michel Maria, Yolla Maria, Michèle Maria, and Georges Maria. The group is currently led by brother and sister duo Georges and Michèle. Michèle attained her Bachelor's degree in Architecture from the American University of Beirut in 1999, where she was honored with the Azar Award and Areen Award for Excellence in Architecture. On the other hand, Georges Maria completed his Master's degree in Architecture from the Academie Libanaise des Beaux Arts in 2003.

MariaGroup opened their inaugural office in Downtown Beirut. However, in 2006, they relocated to Rue du Liban in Achrafieh. In 2022, MariaGroup established a new office in Dubai, and in 2023 another office in London.

== Notable projects ==
MariaGroup has been involved in public and commercial projects. Some examples include:

=== ACS Faculty Building ===
Following their competition win, MariaGroup was commissioned to design the new faculty building at the American Community School, considering both its current context and future master plan.

=== Wadi Qortuba compound ===
MariaGroup is one of the architectural firms involved in the design of the Wadi Qortuba in Riyadh. The compound, developed by Solidere International, is a contemporary low-rise residential complex for expatriates. MariaGroup, along with other architects, contributed to the creation of a harmonious and diverse range of residential accommodation options. The design prioritized optimization of living units, creation of protected pedestrian routes, and sustainability through passive and active strategies. The project received recognition at the Cityscape Global Awards 2018 in the Residential Low to Medium-Rise category.

=== Mayha restaurant ===
Mayha Restaurant introduced the first exclusive "Omakase" dining experience in Beirut. Mayha was shortlisted for the restaurant and bar design awards. Mayha Restaurant made its debut in Beirut. The restaurant gained recognition by being shortlisted for the restaurant and bar design awards. On August 4, 2020, Mayha and a large section of Beirut was damaged from the Port explosion, leading to the closure of the restaurant.

After a span of two years, a new Mayha Restaurant opened its doors in London's Marylebone area, designed by MariaGroup. Currently listed on the Michelin guide, the restaurant offers an Omakase experience on the ground floor, while the lower ground floor houses a Japanese bar.

=== Meat The Fish London ===
Situated in the heart of Cadogan Garden in central London, the Meat the Fish project encompasses the Ground Floor and Lower Ground Floor of a four-story building. This marks the debut of Meat the Fish in Europe, following the original concept developed in Beirut. The restaurant serves a MediterrAsian cuisine, adapting dishes seasonally.

=== Centrale Restaurant Redesign ===
In 2014, MariaGroup received a commission to undertake the interior and outdoor space redesign of Centrale Restaurant in Beirut. The restaurant was initially conceived by architect Bernard Khoury in 2001.

=== House of Today Biennale ===
In 2014, MariaGroup participated in the House of Today Biennale, theme "Naked, beyond the social mask". Their contribution to the event with a custom designed table titled "Showdown". The installation featured a table displayed atop a large mirror, reflecting an unexpected underside, creating an intriguing visual effect.

=== Skirt Steakhouse Interior Design ===
In 2017, the firm was credited with the internationally published interior design of Skirt steakhouse, located in the Beirut Central District.

== Recognition ==
MariaGroup has gained recognition as one of the top 35 architects in Beirut.

== See also ==
- Architecture
- Interior design
