= Choir of Beirut =

Orthodox choir

- Origin: Beirut, Lebanon
- Genres: Christian gospel
- Occupations: Musician, composer
- Years active: 1992-present
- Labels: Quartos
- Members: Marcél Khourie
- Website: www.choirofbeirut.cf

The Choir of the Orthodox Church of Beirut was founded in 1992 by مارسيل خوري (Marcél Khourie).

The Choir comprises 3 boy and 2 girls choristers, aged between nine and 13 years, and 14 male undergraduates, reading for degrees in a variety of subjects. There are also two organ scholars.

The Choir's first Album 'Anacheed Al Kanissa Al Orthodoxia' which recorded in 1995 was released officially on major digital distributors in 2017.

== Discography ==
The following recordings were mainly released by Quartos

- Anachheed Al Kanissa Al Orthodoxia (2017)
- Orthodox Sacred Chant Byzantine Music (2017)
