= Michel Abboud =

Lebanese-born American architect

- Born: December 21, 1977; Beirut, Lebanon
- Education: Columbia University, GSAPP, New York
- Occupations: Architect, artist
- Notable work: Park51, 45 Park Place, 50 Lispenard, One at Palm, Langham Hotel, Unilux, Wave, Amchit Bay, Workshop,

Michel Abboud (born December 21, 1977) is an architect and artist based in New York. He is the founding principal of SOMA Architects, an architectural firm established in 2004 in New York City. Abboud has won the AIA Gold Medal and the James Beard award in 2015, and is a two-time winner of the Architizer A+ award.

In 2010, Abboud was awarded the Park51 Islamic Cultural Center project, which was heavily attacked by right-wing commentators who dubbed it the "Ground Zero Mosque". One journalist called him 'the most controversial architect the US has known'. The project was ultimately shelved in favor of 45 Park Place, a 665-foot condominium tower also designed by Abboud.

== Projects ==
=== 45 Park Place ===
Located in Tribeca, New York City, the 667-foot-tall (203 m) tower’s design is characterized by an "inside-out" process which changes the neighborhood's traditional loft into a vertical modern glass structure, and re-uses the full-floor units, including lofted 16-foot (4.9 m) ceilings, and an in-unit elevator. It has full-height glass windows which provide unobstructed, 360-degree views of the city.

=== CALYPSO ===
CALYPSO is situated entirely in the sea along the coast of Jounieh Bay in North Lebanon. With only a lateral connection to land, the residential structure is able to withstand continuous wave impacts with heights of up to 18 feet (5.5 m) without incurring breakage. The structure's unique glass envelope is the first ever to be designed as wave-proof. The design received a World Architecture Design Award in 2019.

=== Unilux ===
Hailed as a “marvel of both contemporary design and ingenious problem solving", the Beirut-based showroom project was commissioned by Unilux Group. Given the challenge of working with a 7,000-square-foot (650 m^{2}) space that was mostly underground. Abboud used the showroom's basement space to showcase lighting fixtures housed in individual niche-like wall displays from floor to ceiling. On the upper floor, Abboud used digital modeling software and a parametric design script to create an array of 1000 cubes, positioning them to create the impression of a rippling dynamic floor, walls and ceiling. The continuous, non-linear surfaces allow the ground floor space to appear larger than its originally shallow confines, while the interaction of light on the reflective cubes metaphorically reinforces the showroom's function as a provider of light.

=== WAVE ===
Due to its location on the corner of Beirut's Ashrafieh Mar Mitr quarter, the WAVE residential site faced a series of challenges due to sun exposure, solar overheating and privacy concerns. To mitigate these problems, Abboud and his team created a type of “second skin” for the structure, which acts as a screening mechanism by utilizing a horizontal louvered system. The structure's interactive parametric design allows the depth of the louvers to be controlled by an interior program based on the level of shading and privacy required. The louver becomes thinner with the need for less privacy or more sunlight, or deeper when more privacy or shading is desired. The effect of these dynamic, parametrically generated mechanisms gives the building exterior the appearance of having organic waves. The design for WAVE, also nicknamed “The W Residences” won Abboud an Architizer A+ award in 2017.

=== One at Palm Jumeirah ===
Abboud broke records in the Middle East for his design of the most expensive structure ever to be built in Dubai.

== Other selected projects ==
| Building/Project | Location | Date |
|---|---|---|
| Amchit Bay Resort | Lebanon | 2013 |
| The Carlton Hotel | Beirut, Lebanon | 2008 |
| Wave | Beirut, Lebanon | 2010 |
| Nikki Beach Resort | Dammour, Lebanon | 2012 |
| Bobo | Beirut, Lebanon | 2011 |
| The Gate | Beirut, Lebanon | 2011 |
| Castor | Beirut, Lebanon | 2011 |
| Batrun Annex I & II | Batroun, Lebanon | 2005 |
| Workshop Kitchen + Bar | Los Angeles, CA, US | 2019 |
| Tartinery | New York, NY, US | 2009 |
| Yazuzu | Washington, DC, US | 2006 |
| Naya | New York, NY, US | 2007 |
| Aura | Erbil, Kurdistan | 2011 |
| 50 Lispenard | New York, NY, US | 2012 |
| 93 Crosby Lofts | New York, NY, US | 2006 |
| Gemini | Dubai, UAE | |
| King Road Mall | Jeddah, Saudi Arabia | 2007 |
| One at DIFC | Dubai, UAE | 2016 |
| Dubai Creek Harbor | Dubai, UAE | 2018 |
| 7 Times Square | New York, NY, US | |
| Shaza Hotel Doha | Doha, Qatar | 2013 |
| Langham Place Dubai | Dubai, UAE | 2013 |
| Mayasem | Jeddah, Saudi Arabia | 2018 |
| Marassi | Marassi, Egypt | 2018 |
| Beverly Hills private residence | Beverly Hills, California | 2019 |
| Veli Athiri private resort | Qatar | 2018 |

== Awards and recognition ==
| Organization | Award or Recognition | Project | Date |
|---|---|---|---|
| Architizer | A+ Award | WAVE | 2017 |
| Architizer | A+ Award | Unilux | 2016 |
| James Beard Foundation | Restaurant Design Award | Workshop Kitchen + Bar | 2015 |
| Middle East Architect | Shortlist - Principal of the Year Award | | 2015 |
| Dwell Magazine | Top 10 Best-Designed Restaurants in America | Workshop Kitchen + Bar | 2015 |
| Bisnow | Top 10 Cutting-Edge Architects | | 2015 |
| International Property Awards | Best Mixed Use Architecture in Arabia | Aura | 2012 |
| International Property Awards | Best Mixed Use Architecture in Iraq | Aura | 2012 |
| International Property Awards | Highly Commended Architecture Multiple Residence | Nikki Beach | 2012 |
| Restaurant and Bar Design Awards | Category Winner | Workshop Kitchen + Bar | 2014 |
| IAIR Awards | Best Company for Leadership, Architectural Design | | 2014 |
| REAL Estate Awards | Finest Specialized Project | Amchit Bay | 2014 |
| World Interior News Awards | Shortlist - Best Design Award | Unilux | 2015 |
| World Interior News Awards | Shortlist - Best Design Award | Workshop Kitchen + Bar | 2013 |
| APR | World Architecture & Design Award | CALYPSO | 2019 |
