= Mardiros Altounian =

Armenian-Lebanese architect (1889–1958)

- Մարտիրոս Ալթունեան
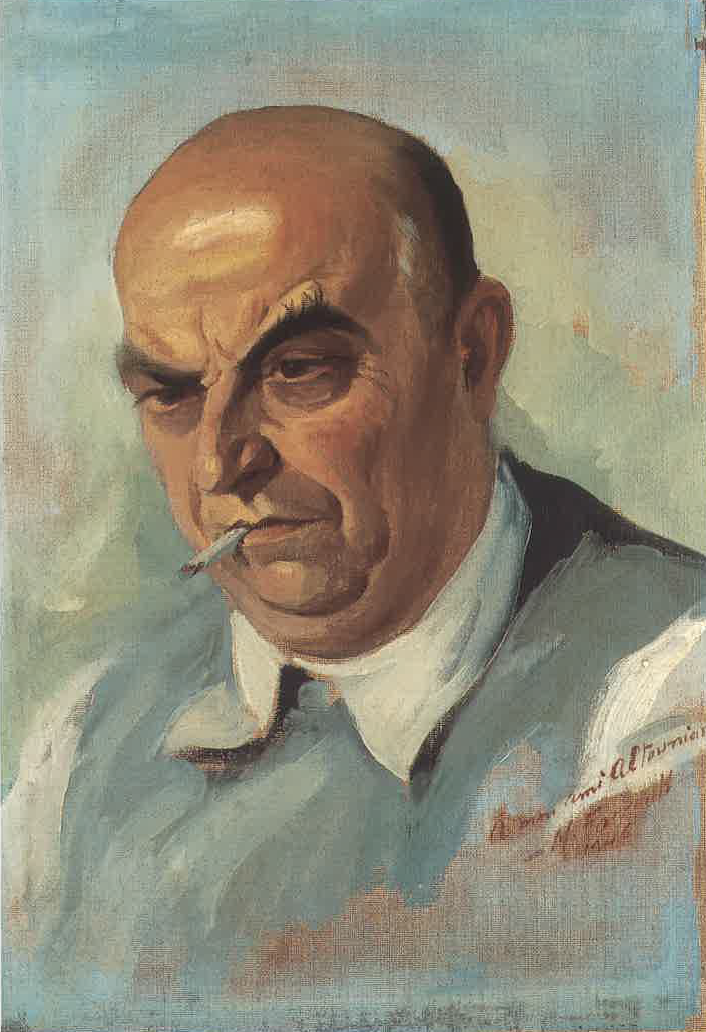
- Portrait of Mardiros Altounian (oil on canvas, 1946) by Moustafa Farroukh, Sursock Museum, Beirut
- Born: September 21, 1889; Bursa, Ottoman Empire
- Died: December 20, 1958 (aged 69); Beirut, Lebanon
- Education: École nationale supérieure des Beaux-Arts, Paris (1918)
- Occupation: Architect
- Buildings: Lebanese Parliament Building; Al-Abed Clock Tower; Armenian Sanatorium of Azounieh; Melkonian Benefactors' Mausoleum

Mardiros Altounian (Armenian: Մարտիրոս Ալթունեան; 21 September 1889 – 19 December 1958) was an Armenian-Lebanese architect active during the French Mandate period and early independence of Lebanon. Born in Bursa in the late Ottoman Empire, he trained at the École nationale supérieure des Beaux-Arts in Paris and became an architect active in Beirut during the interwar period. He is best known for designing the Lebanese Parliament Building (completed 1934) at Nejmeh Square, the Al-Abed Clock Tower, the Armenian Sanatorium of Azounieh, and the Melkonian Benefactors' Mausoleum in Nicosia, Cyprus.

== Early life and education ==
Mardiros Altounian was born on 21 September 1889 in Bursa, a major city in western Anatolia then part of the Ottoman Empire, into the Armenian community of the region. He subsequently pursued architectural studies in Bulgaria, then in France, graduating from the École nationale supérieure des Beaux-Arts in Paris in 1918. Altounian's formation in Paris also exposed him to Oriental architectural styles then fashionable in European design schools, drawing on sources from Istanbul, Cairo, and the Levant.

== Career in Lebanon ==
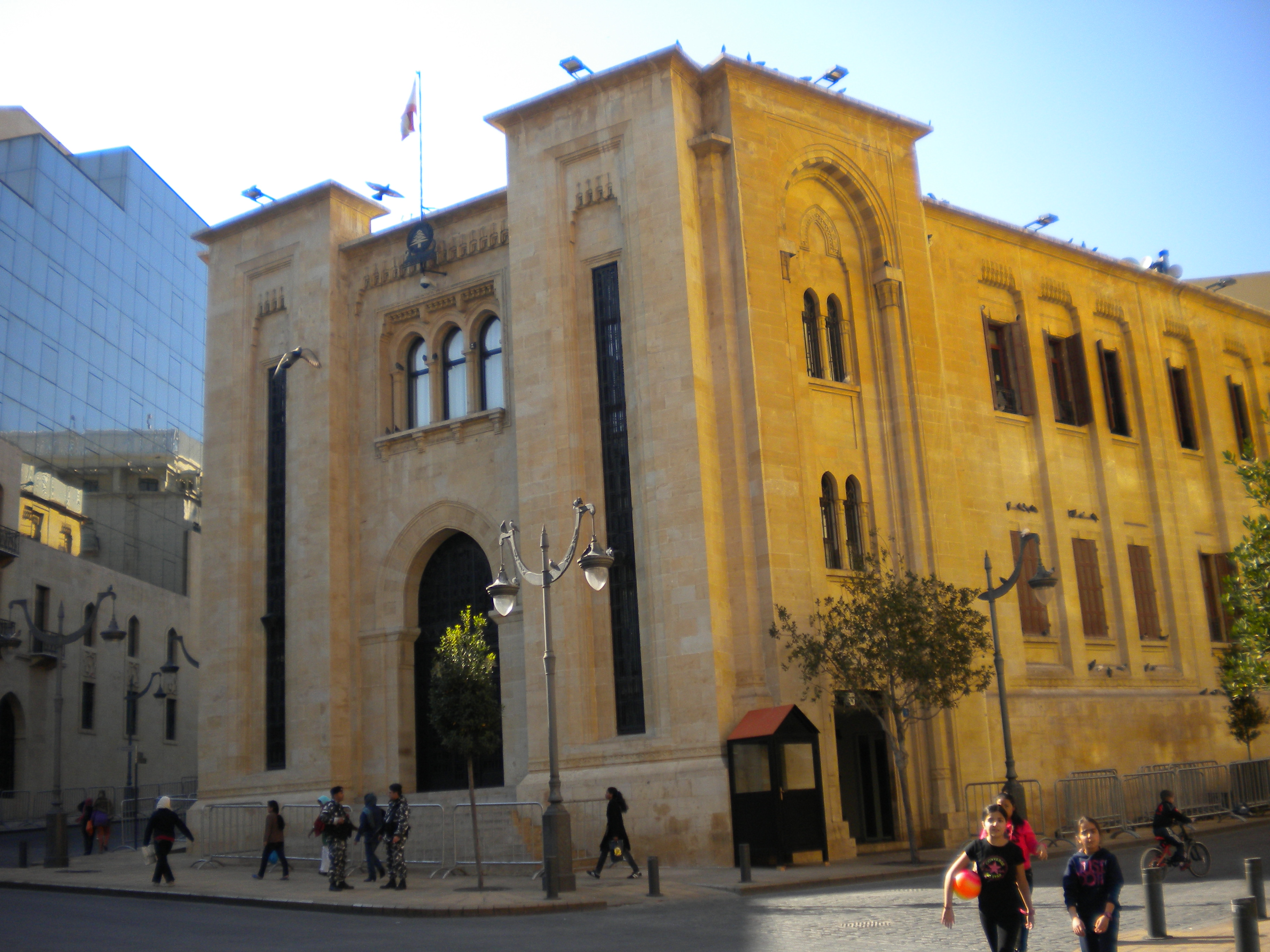
Lebanese Parliament

Following his graduation and marriage in 1919, he relocated to Beirut to join his family, who had already settled there. At that time, Beirut had become the capital of the newly established Greater Lebanon under the French Mandate (1920–1943), and Altounian was appointed as an architect within the Ministry of Public Works. The French authorities undertook a program of urban modernization in Beirut's city center during the 1920s and 1930s, transforming the area around what would become Place de l'Étoile (Nejmeh Square) into a Haussmann-inspired star-shaped plaza, a plan drafted by Camille Duraffourd and executed between 1926 and 1933. Altounian became one of the central architects commissioned to design buildings around the square,

Altounian designed the Lebanese Parliament Building on Nejmeh Square in central Beirut. Commissioned during the French Mandate in 1933 and completed in 1934, the building serves as the seat of the Parliament of Lebanon.

Advised by the authorities to design the building in the spirit of Lebanese tradition, Altounian undertook research visits to the Emirs' palaces in the Chouf Mountains, drawing on local vernacular forms while synthesizing them with the Beaux-Arts vocabulary of his Parisian training. He also drew on Oriental styles then being interpreted by architects working in Paris, Istanbul, and Cairo. The building integrates Beaux-Arts compositional principles with distinctly Levantine decorative elements, including twin and triple arch windows, and a limestone façade adorned with recessed panels, arched openings, and tiered muqarnas (stalactite vaulting). The interior features a reinforced concrete frame supporting a cupola of twenty meters in diameter covering the chamber of deputies. Before the Lebanese Civil War, the building also housed the National Library; the library's collection of approximately 20,000 volumes, including ancient manuscripts, was partly destroyed during the conflict.

Also located on Nejmeh Square, the Al-Abed Clock Tower was designed by Altounian and completed in 1934. The tower was a gift to the city of Beirut from Michel Abed, a Lebanese-Brazilian émigré businessman, and its four-faced clock became an iconic element of the square's streetscape.

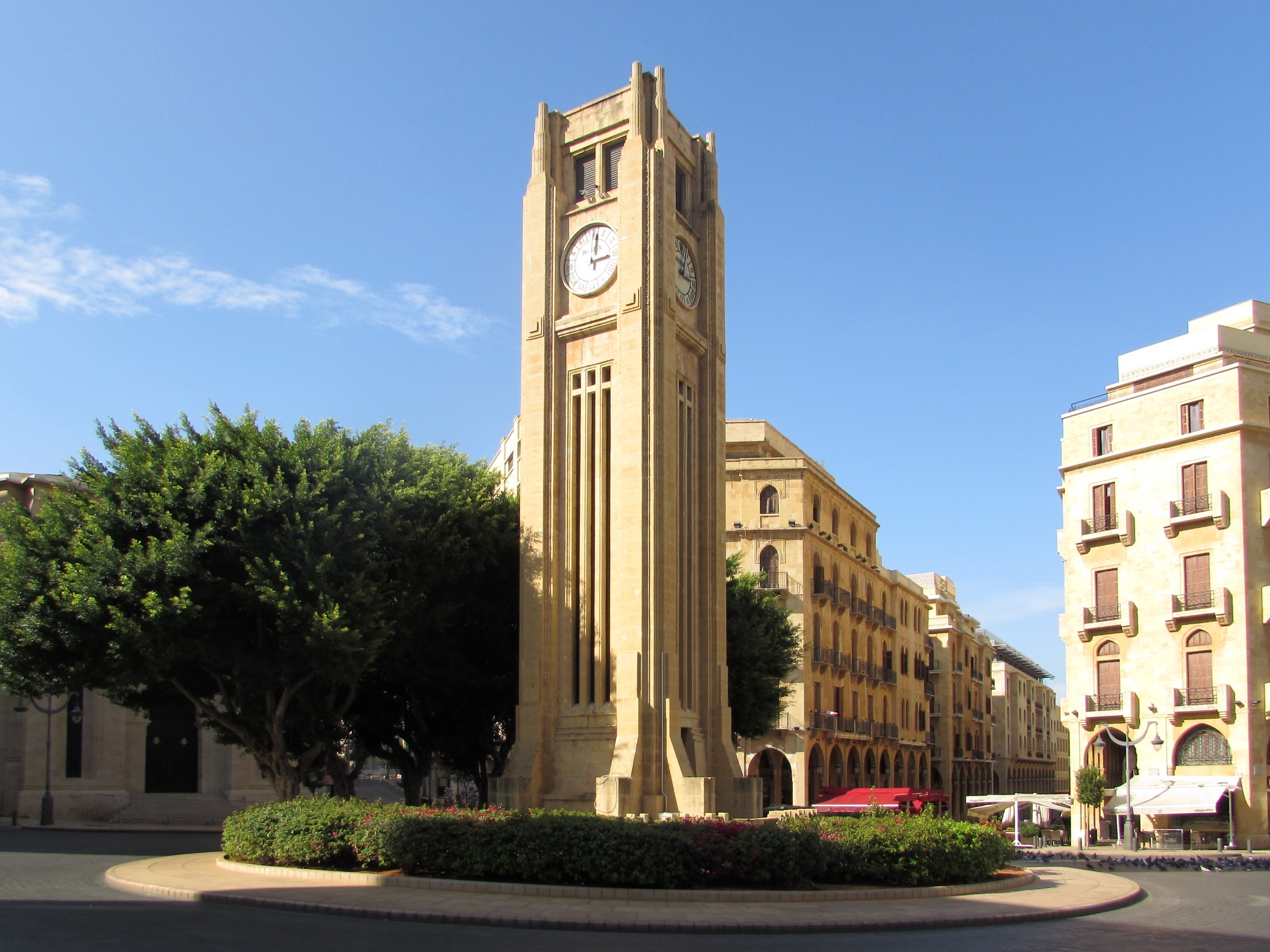
A gift from an emigré Miguel Abed, the clock tower in Nejmeh Square

Altounian's portfolio extended across a diverse range of civic, religious, and residential commissions. In 1937, he designed the Armenian Sanatorium of Azounieh in the Chouf region, a healthcare facility serving the Armenian community in Lebanon. That same period saw the completion of the Abu Bakr Al-Siddiq Mosque at the Port of Beirut and the Al-Daaouk Palace in Hamra. In 1942, he designed Asmahan Palace in Aley, and in 1947 the Church of the Paulist Fathers in Harissa. Other works he completed for the Armenian community in Lebanon included the Cathedral of Saint Gregory the Illuminator in Antelias (1939–1940). In 1946, he designed the Evacuation Stele (Lāwḥat al-Jalāʾ) at Nahr el-Kalb, north of Beirut, commemorating the withdrawal of all foreign troops from Lebanese territory on 31 December 1946, during the presidency of Bechara El-Khoury.

== Work abroad ==
Toward the end of his career, Altounian designed the Melkonian Benefactors' Mausoleum at the Melkonian Educational Institute in Nicosia, Cyprus, in collaboration with the French-Armenian sculptor Léon Mouradoff. The mausoleum replaced an earlier wooden octagonal trellis monument erected by students in 1935. Its foundation stone was laid on 24 April 1954 by Bishop Ghevont Chebeyian, and the completed mausoleum was inaugurated on 15 January 1956. The white marble structure contains the remains of the brothers Krikor Melkonian (1843–1920) and Garabed Melkonian (1849–1934), tobacco traders from Egypt who were the principal benefactors of the institute. The mausoleum features marble engravings and bronze portrait busts of both brothers, and stands between the institute's two main historical buildings.

== Legacy ==
Altounian died on 19 December 1958 in Beirut. His portrait was painted in 1946 by the Lebanese modernist painter Moustafa Farroukh and is held in the collection of the Sursock Museum in Beirut. Several of Altounian's principal works are concentrated around Nejmeh Square in central Beirut, including the Lebanese Parliament Building and Al-Abed Clock Tower.

== Selected works ==
Year	Building	Location	Notes
1931–1934	Lebanese Parliament Building	Nejmeh Square, Beirut, Lebanon	Seat of the Parliament of Lebanon; Beaux-Arts with Levantine detailing; 20 m diameter cupola
1932	Abu Bakr Al-Siddiq Mosque	Beirut, Lebanon	Also known as Al-Dabbagha Mosque
1934	Miguel Al-Abed Clock Tower	Nejmeh Square, Beirut, Lebanon	Gift of Michel Abed; four-faced clock
1937	Armenian Sanatorium of Azounieh	Azounieh, Chouf district, Lebanon	Healthcare facility for the Armenian community
1939–1940	Cathedral of Saint Gregory the Illuminator	Antelias, Lebanon	Commission for the Armenian community in Lebanon
1942	Villa Asmahan	Aley, Lebanon	Commissioned by Abro Abroyan
1947–1962	Melkite Greek Catholic Basilica of Saint Paul	Harissa-Daraoun, Lebanon	Byzantine style-inspired basilica
1947?	Al-Daaouk Palace	Hamra, Beirut, Lebanon	
1954–1956	Melkonian Benefactors' Mausoleum	Melkonian Educational Institute, Nicosia, Cyprus	With sculptor Léon Mouradoff; white marble; bronze busts of Krikor and Garabed Melkonian

== Gallery ==
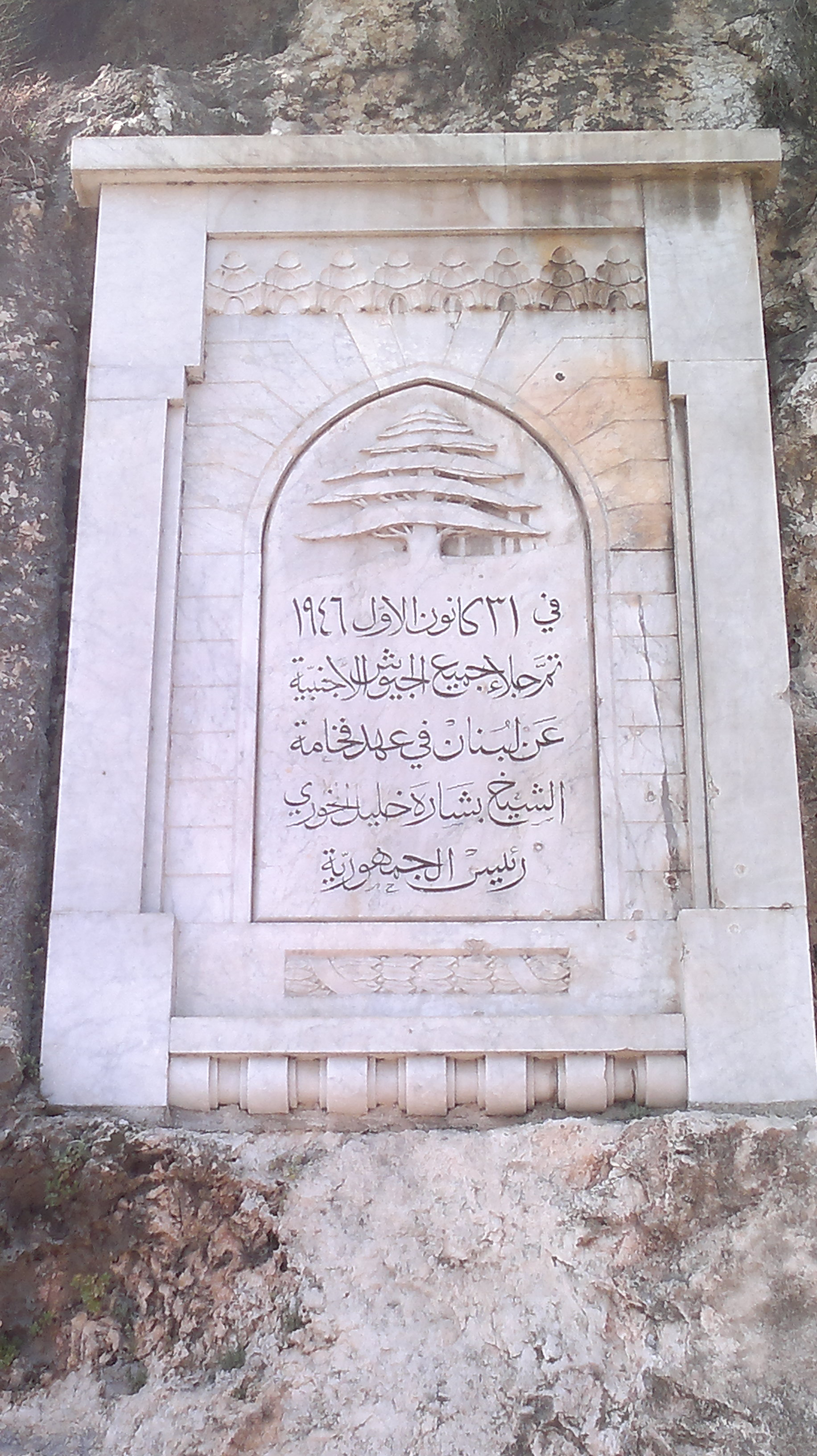
Lawhat al-Jalaa commemorative stela

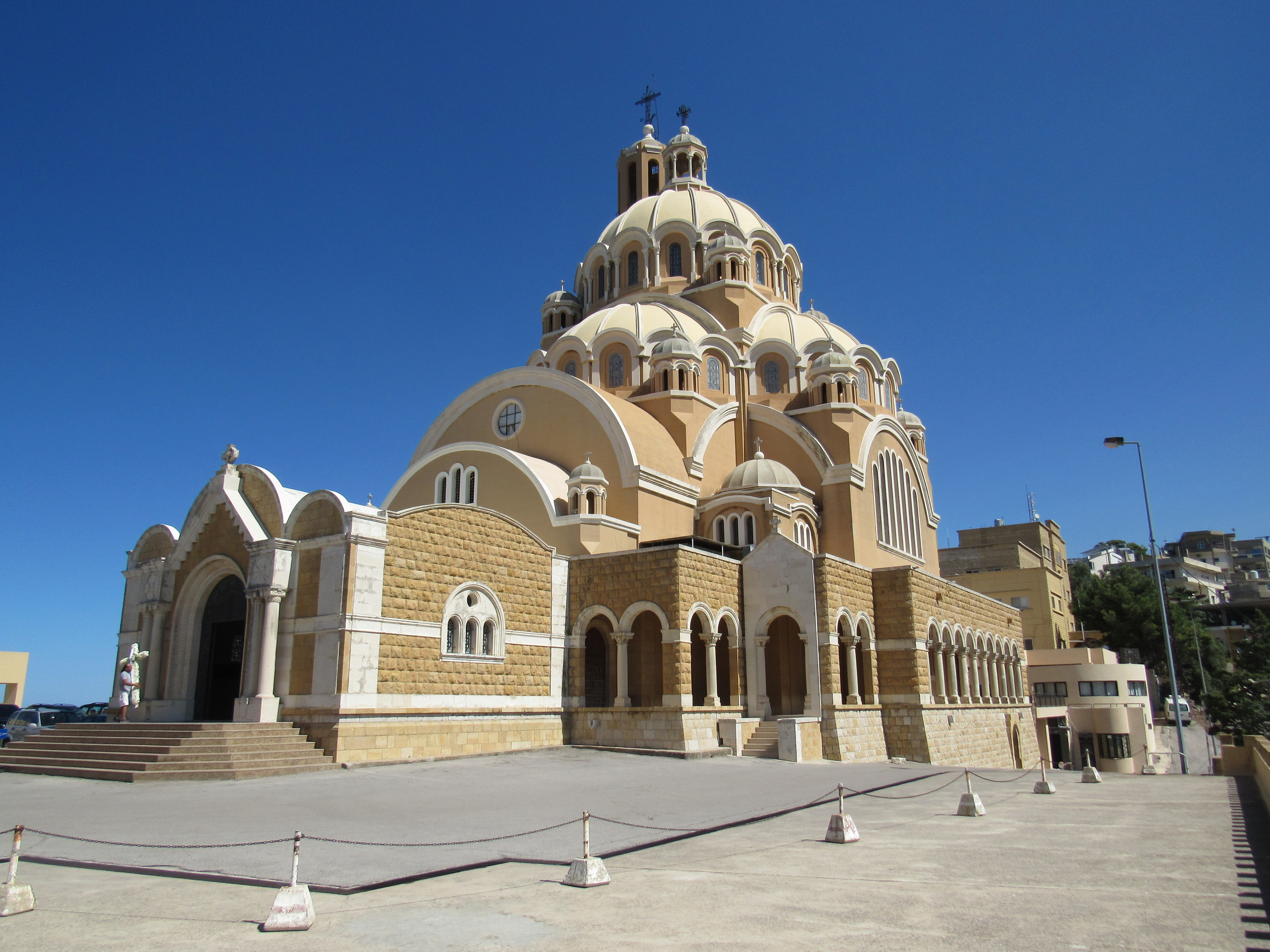
Saint Paul Basilica in Harissa, Lebanon

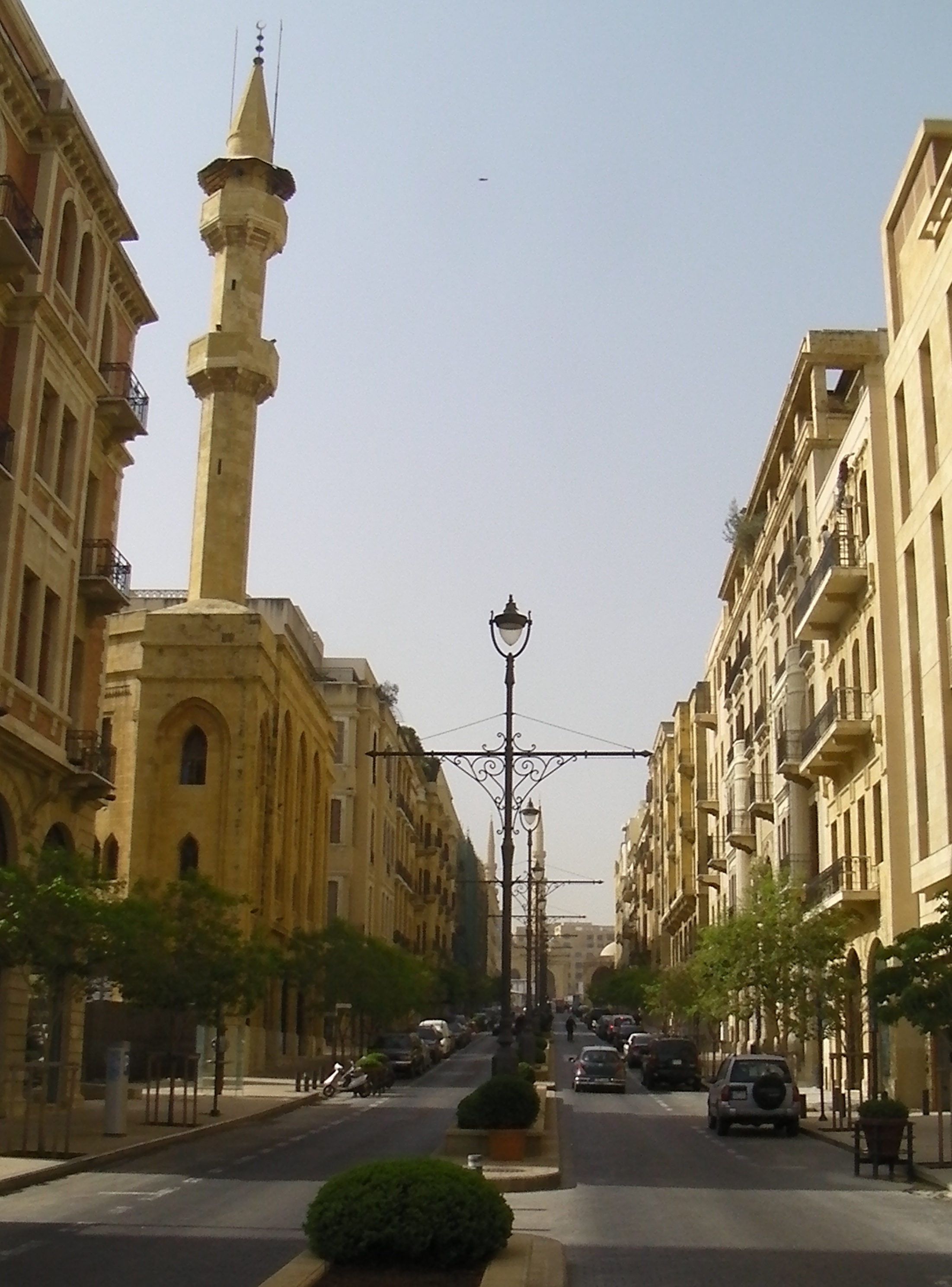
Foch street and the Abu Bakr al-Siddiq mosque, Beirut

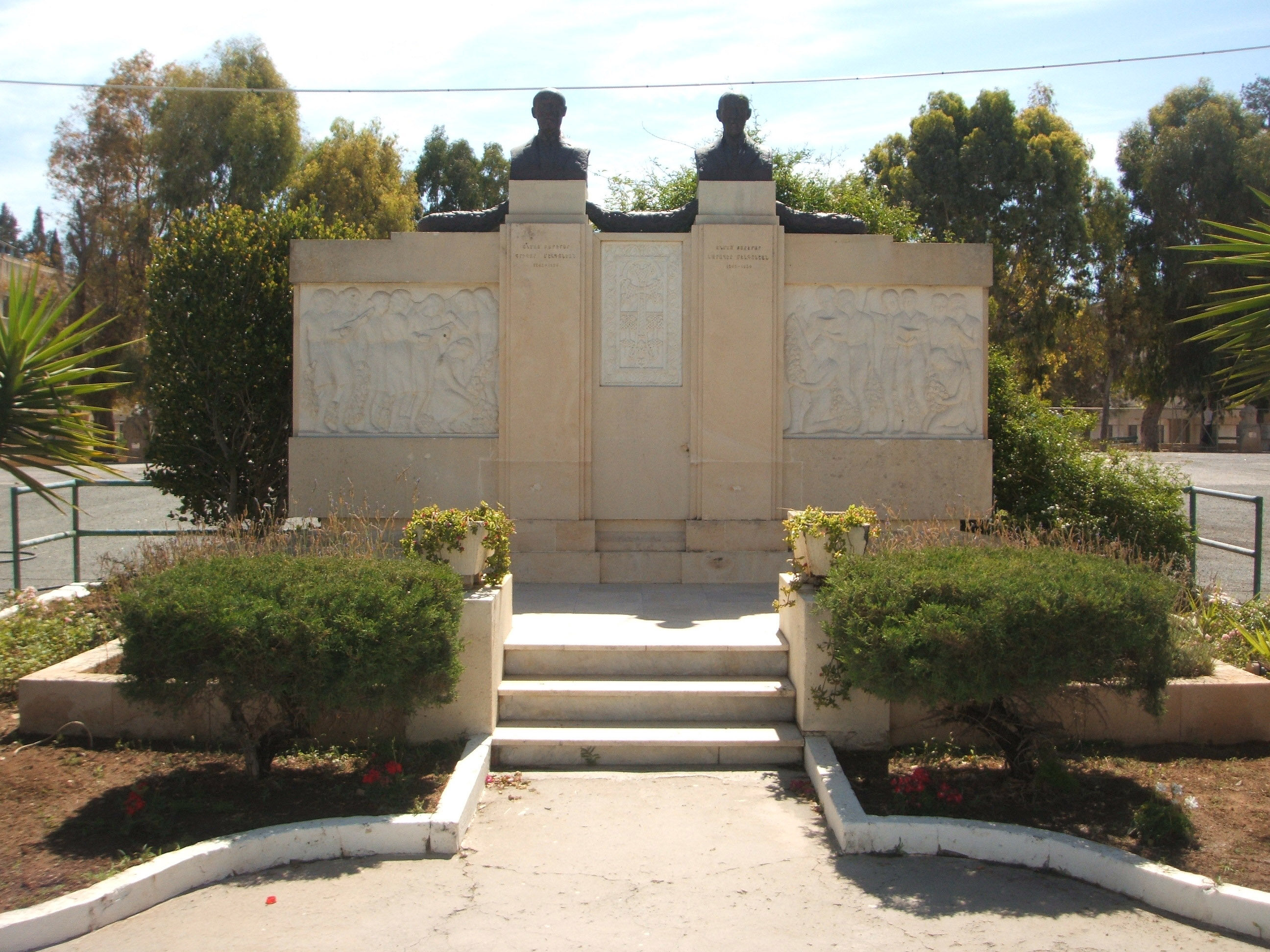
Melkonian brothers mausoleum in Nicosia

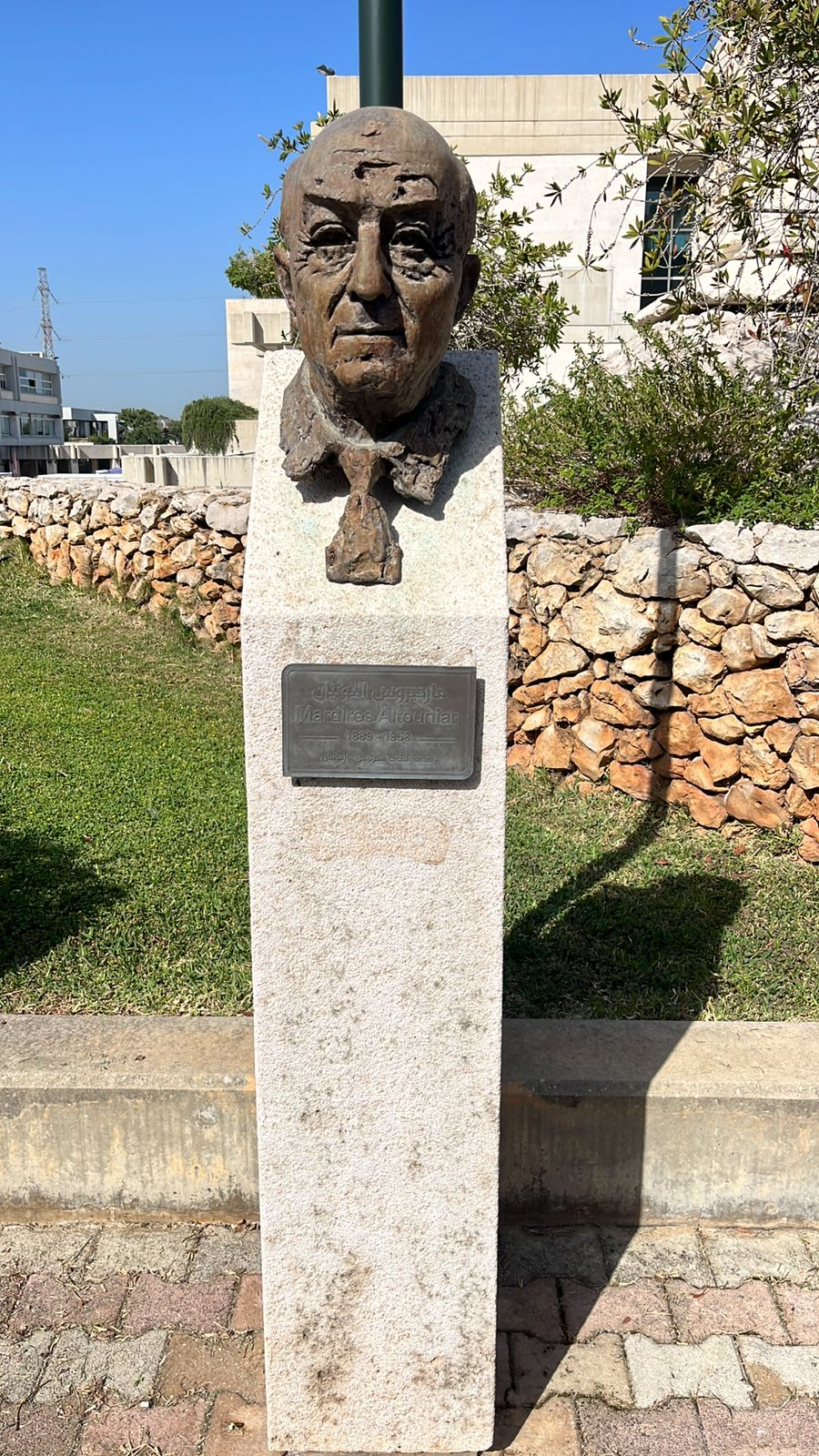
Bust of Altounian at the Notre Dame University–Louaize, Lebanon

== Sources ==
- "Altounian, Mardiros". Armenian Soviet Encyclopedia (in Armenian). Vol. 1. Yerevan: Armenian Academy of Sciences. 1980.
- Archnet. "Place de l'Étoile, Beirut". ArchNet.
- Dumont, Paul (2013). "Salonica and Beirut: The Reshaping of Two Ottoman Cities of the Eastern Mediterranean" (PDF). In Ginio, E.; Kaser, K. (eds.). Ottoman Legacies in the Contemporary Mediterranean. The Balkans and the Middle East Compared. pp. 189–207.
- Fakhoury, Abed al Latif (2019). "تاريخ الهندسة المعمارية في بيروت منذ شيخ البنّائين (معمار باشي) إلى مهندز العصر الحديث" [The history of architecture in Beirut from Sheikh al-Bana'in (Ma'mar Pasha) to modern-day engineer]. مرايا التراث [Mirrors of Heritage] (in Arabic). 8: 82–104.
- Farroukh, Moustafa (1946), Portrait of Architect Mardiros Altounian (Oil on canvas), Beirut: Sursock Museum
- Hadjilyra, Alexander-Michael (2009). The Armenians of Cyprus. Larnaca: Kalaydjian Foundation.
- El-Jurdi, Sami (2015). "Villa Asmahan – Aley – Then & Now – Green Titles". www.greentitles.com.
- Khalaf, Samir (2006-03-01). Heart of Beirut: Reclaiming the Bourj. Saqi. ISBN 978-0-86356-590-8.
- Middleton, Robin; Watkin, David (1980). Neoclassical and 19th Century Architecture. London: Faber & Faber.
- Migliorino, Nicola (2008). (Re)constructing Armenia in Lebanon and Syria: ethno-cultural diversity and the state in the aftermath of a refugee crisis. Studies in forced migration. New York: Berghahn Books. ISBN 978-0-85745-057-9.
- L'Orient le Jour staff (1999-02-02). "Un homme évoque l'oeuvre de son père Mardiros Altouian, l'architecte du Parlement , in memoriam.... (photos)" [A man recalls the work of his father Mardiros Altouian, the architect of the Parliament, in memoriam... (photos)]. L'Orient-Le Jour (in French).
- Pinon, Pierre (2009). "Les fondements de l'orientalisme architectural en France. Les cours d'histoire de l'architecture de Jean Nicolas Huyot à l'École des beaux-arts (1823–1840)". In Oulebsir, Nabila; Volait, Mercedes (eds.). L'Orientalisme architectural entre imaginaires et savoirs. Paris: Publications de l'Institut national d'histoire de l'art. doi:10.4000/books.inha.3348.
- Trad, André (2001). "The Legacy of Modern Architecture in Beirut". Archived from the original on 2013-08-07.
- Petit Futé Beyrouth. Paris: Petit Futé. 2024.

== See also ==
- Youssef Aftimus
- list of Lebanese architects
