= Beirut Heritage Trail =

The Beirut Heritage Trail is a project undertaken by Solidere with the support of the Ministry of Culture and the Municipality of Beirut. Marked out by bronze medallions grouted into the sidewalk, the trail links archeological sites, historic public spaces and heritage buildings over a 2.5 km walking circuit in the historic core of Beirut.

== History ==
The Beirut Heritage Trail was launched in the Spring of 2016.

Marked out by bronze medallions grouted into the sidewalk, the trail links archeological sites, historic public spaces and heritage buildings over a 2.5 km walking circuit in the historic core, revealing many layers of Beirut's history and development. Large district panels and smaller monument panels are made from glazed lava-stone tiles mounted on stainless steel stands. With texts prepared in three languages (Arabic, French and English) these panels are illustrated with historic maps, photographs and drawings. The circuit will start at the Beirut Souks, which retain the 2,500-year-old ancient street grid and Ottoman access gates, and incorporate several archeological remains including the Phoenico-Persian Quarter, the City Wall and Moat, the restored Mamluk Zawiyat Ibn Arraq and Al-Majidiyyeh Mosque. Many Byzantine mosaics were salvaged during archeological excavations there. One has been reconstructed and laid in the modern souks close to its original alignment within the colonnade of the Roman street that once led through Bab Idriss Square, gateway to the Hippodrome in Wadi Abou Jamil. Leaving Beirut Souks, the trail leads south past Emir Munzer Mosque and onto the Roman Baths Garden and public space, through Riad Al Solh Square to the Grand Theatre, Lebanon and the southern end of the colonnaded Maarad Street (Rue Maarad). Between this street and Saint George Maronite Cathedral, there is an overlook to the Roman Cardo Maximus. The trail then leads to Nejmeh Square, the French Mandate Etoile, Parliament building as well as the Saint George Greek Orthodox Cathedral and St Elie Greek Catholic Cathedral. Behind these lies the Nouriya chapel (Sayyidat al-Nouriyyeh) at a focal overlook to the planned Hadiqat As-Samah (Garden of Forgiveness). The trail continues to the restored Al-Omari Grand Mosque. It passes by the Municipality of Beirut building of 1925 and the 16th century Emir Assaf Mosque to Martyrs’ Square, the Canaanite Tell and site of the Beirut City History Museum.

By way of Castle Square, historic Foch Street and Harbor Square, site of Beirut's ancient port, the trail traverses the Foch-Allenby District to regain Beirut Souks on Trablos Street, at the site museum of the Phoenico-Persian Quarter.

== See also ==
- Municipality of Beirut
- Beirut Souks
- Bab Idriss Square
- Foch-Allenby District
- Riad Al Solh Square
