= Avenue Foch (disambiguation) =

Avenue Foch is an avenue in the 16th arrondissement of Paris, France, named after World War I Marshal Ferdinand Foch.

Avenue Foch may also refer to:

- Avenue Foch station, a station in Paris's express suburban rail system
- Yan'an Road, a road in Shanghai, China, formerly called Avenue Foch

== See also ==
- Marshal Ferdinand Foch Street in Bydgoszcz
- Foch Street, Beirut, Lebanon
