= Phoenico-Persian Quarter =

Phoenico-Persian Quarter is located in Beirut, Lebanon.

== Overview ==
A Phoenician quarter dating to the Persian period overlooked the city near the harbor. It is situated in today’s Foch-Allenby District.

== Construction ==
A Phoenician quarter dating to the Persian period overlooked the bustling city near the harbor. Housing blocks of 48 × 14 meters created an orthogonal street plan similar to those of other Phoenician and Greek cities. This ancient rectangular plan survived for centuries and is still present in the alignment of Souk al-Tawileh. Human clay figurines retrieved from the houses further emphasize the Phoenician character of the city. A standing stone in the courtyard of one of the houses is a reminder of the worship of ‘sacred stones,’ while Greek pottery recovered from the site is proof of links between Biruta and the Greek cities of the Aegean.

== History ==
A Phoenician quarter dating to the Persian period overlooked the bustling city near the harbor, situated in what is now the Foch-Allenby district. This quarter developed amidst a particular historical context. Phoenician towns were experiencing a renaissance in those times, since Persian kings relied on Phoenician ships to establish commercial links with the Eastern Mediterranean cities and beyond. In times of war against the Greeks, they were also called upon to build ships for the Persian fleet, and ferry their troops to the battlefields. Housing blocks of 48 × 14 meters created an orthogonal street plan similar to those of other Phoenician and Greek cities. This ancient rectangular plan survived for centuries and is still present in the alignment of Souk al-Tawileh. Human clay figurines retrieved from the houses further emphasize the Phoenician character of the city. A standing stone in the courtyard of one of the houses is a reminder of the worship of "sacred stones", while Greek pottery recovered from the site is proof of links between Biruta and the Greek cities of the Aegean.

== See also ==
- Phoenicia
- Persian Empire
- Foch-Allenby District
- Beirut Souks
- Souk al-Tawileh
