= Fadia Ahmad =

Lebanese photographer and filmmaker

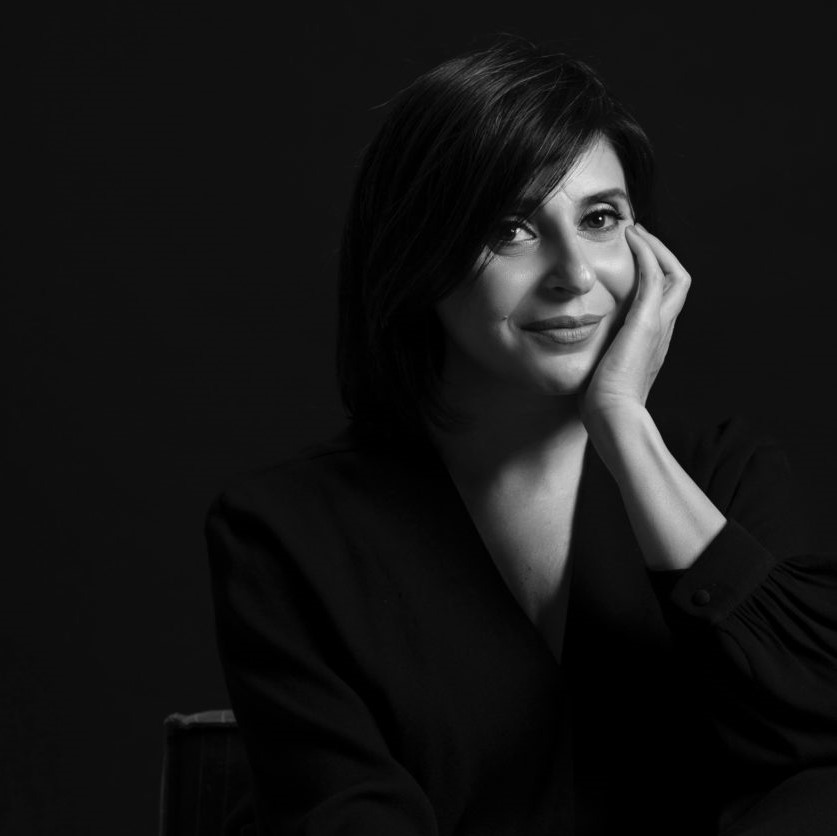
- Fadia Ahmad
- Born: 1975 (age 50–51); Alicante, Spain
- Education: L'Institut d'études scéniques, audiovisuelles et cinématographiques (IESAV)
- Notable work: Beirut, the Aftermath
- Website: https://www.fadiaahmad.com

Fadia Ahmad (born 1975) is a Spanish-Lebanese photographer, artist, and filmmaker.

Her practice focuses largely on creating narratives through her photography. She has created several series of portraits and landscapes, particularly in Africa, the Middle East and Asia. Engaged in humanitarian issues, she released two series of photographs and films about refugees in Lebanon entitled It Could Be You.

== Background ==
Ahmad was born in Alicante, Spain to Lebanese parents who fled the Lebanese Civil War in the 1970s. In 1991, she returned to Lebanon and attended university at the L'Institut d'études scéniques, audiovisuelles et cinématographiques (IESAV) in Beirut. In addition to studying filmmaking and cinematography, she took courses in photography.

== Selected projects ==
Ahmad's most recent project is Beyrouth/Beirut (2019), an homage to the urban environment, complex demographics, and nostalgic architecture of Lebanon's capital. To complete this photo series, Ahmad walked a daily itinerary of 10,452 steps across the capital city from the neighborhood of Mar Mikhael to the Sporting Club, a social fixture located in the neighborhood of Raouché. The number of steps mirrors the square footage of the Lebanese national territory, indicating Beirut as a microcosm representing the entire country. This project exemplifies Ahmad's interest in and connection to, her homeland, particularly in the patchwork composition of Beirut, and, more broadly, her desire to address ongoing changes in the fabric of the city over the last decade. The project is divided into sections including urban geography, the train station or the lost time, architectural contrasts of past and present, the communities, street life, the fishermen and the seaside promenade and the Corniche.

Beyrouth/Beirut was originally intended as a traveling exhibition. Its first destination was Beit Beirut in 2019, a historic house museum built in 1924 located on the historic Green Line (Lebanon) which separated East and West Beirut during the Lebanese Civil War. The exhibition was later staged at the Jordan National Gallery of Fine Arts in Amman.

In August 2021, Ahmad was a judge on Season 2 of the World Art Collector Incubator, a series dedicated to Lebanese artists launched on YouTube. The mission statement of the program aims to highlight and promote both established and promising artists.

In February 2023, the Lebanese American University screened Ahmad's documentary Beirut, the Aftermath and held a 10-day exhibit showcasing her work, entitled 50 Shades of Blue.

In March 2023, Ahmad's artwork from the Permanent Collection of the Jordan National Gallery was showcased in a group exhibition at the Jordan National Gallery of Fine Arts. Her work was also exhibited at the Her Voice, Her Power" Art Exhibition held at Beit Beirut and organized by the UNDP, USAID, and the European Union on occasion of International Women's Day.

== Beirut, the Aftermath ==
In an interview with ArabNews, Ahmad revealed that she had a strong feeling of anxiety and decided to leave Beirut three days before the 2020 Beirut explosion. She was in Alicante when the explosion occurred and decided to return to Lebanon and film the aftermath as a duty to her country, creating the documentary Beirut, the Aftermath. She stated that the film's purpose is to keep a record of the tragedy and show the world the impact of the explosion on the Lebanese people. The film examines the blast's impact on the local population and historical architecture, and features interviews with an individual who bore witness to the incident. Of the documentary, Ahmad said:

"The news showed the blast and its aftermath, but not the psychological impact it had on Beirut's residents; it was important for me to bring forth how huge the psychological impact of that blast was. People have so much to say, but they never had a chance to say it. The audience will notice the documentary will seem to end at different instances. This symbolizes our never-ending story. There is no defined beginning, no defined end. We are a people perpetually on the cusp of death. Every time we think it's the end, we continue."

Beirut, the Aftermath, Ahmad's first feature documentary film was launched in 2021. The film was featured in many film festivals and she won a number of awards including 2nd place in the Short Films category at the Lebanese Film Festival in Canada and four awards at the Five Continents International Film Festival 2021 in Venezuela.

=== Awards and festivals ===
- The Lebanese Canadian Film Festival in Canada 2021 - Official Selection and 2nd Place Award Winner Feature Film Documentary
- The Lebanese Canadian Film Festival screening "Beirut the Aftermath" at Cinema Guzzo, Cote Vertu, Montreal, Canada
- Rabat International Author Film Festival - Official Selection
- Argenteuil International Film Festival 2021 - July Edition Winner
- Five Continents International Film Festival 2021 - Official Selection and four awards: Best Documentary Half-Length Film, Best Female Director Feature Film, Special Mention Production Feature Film, and Best Poster.
- 'Dessine-moi un cèdre': Hymne Au Liban' Exhibition, November 25 to 27, Galerie Modus, Paris.
- Judge of Season 2 of World Art Collector Incubator, 2021
- SR Socially Relevant Film Festival in New York - Official Selection.
- SR Socially Relevant Film Festival Talk - Meet the Filmmakers.
- SR Socially Relevant Film Festival Talk - Meet the WOMEN Filmmakers.
- From Peoria to Lebanon Exhibition, November 30, 2021, to January 9, 2022, Peoria Riverfront Museum.
- "When life hangs by a thread", Closing Exhibition, March 1 to 31, 2022, Expo 2020 Dubai.
- Film Screening, Duke University, Griffith Theater, March 29, 2022.
- Femme International Film Festival, October 2022, Beverly Hills, Los Angeles.
- Arab Women Artists Now Festival 2023, March 2, 2023, Rich Mix, London.
