= Beirut Castle =

Former Crusader castle in Beirut, Lebanon

Coordinates: 33°53′58″N 35°30′25″E

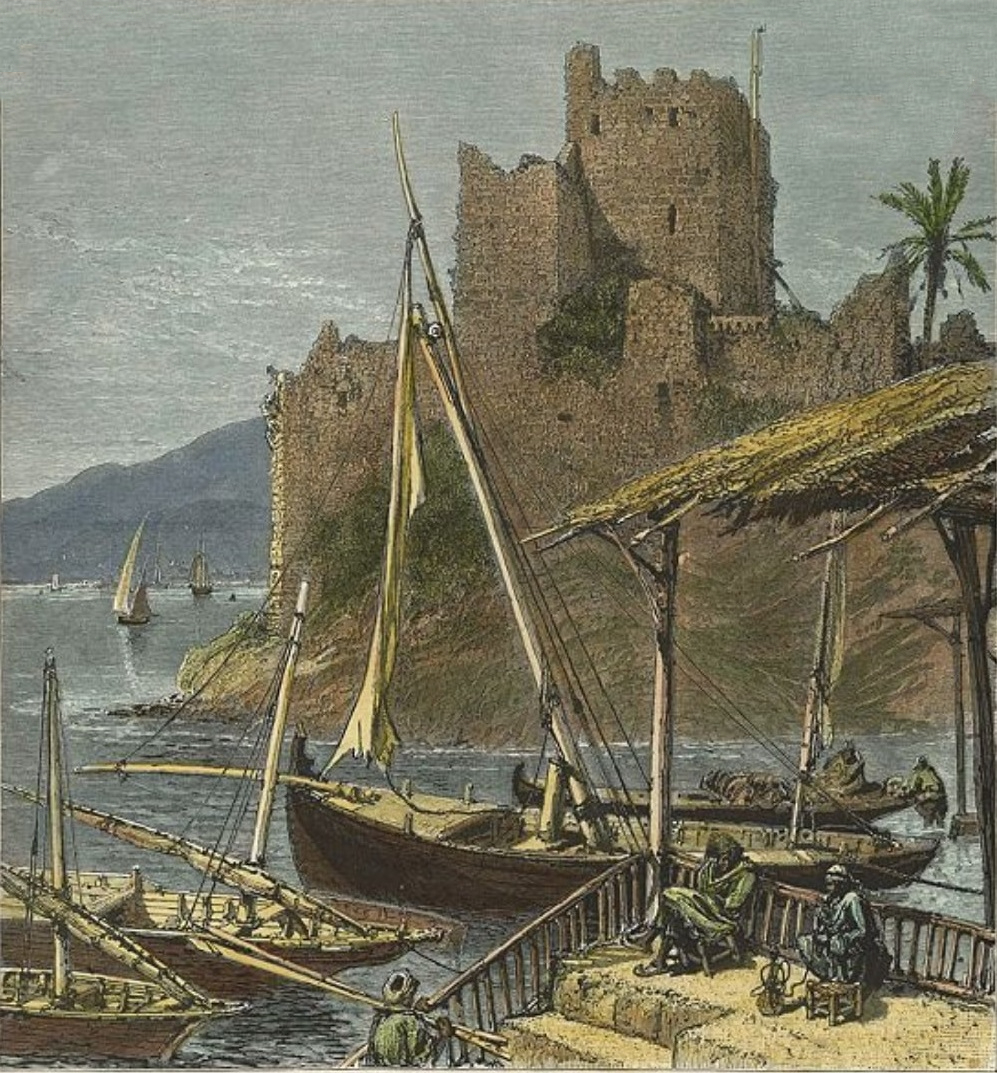
Beirut Castle in the 1870s

Beirut Castle was a major Crusader castle located in downtown Beirut, Lebanon. It was mostly built during the Crusades and demolished during works of extension of the Port of Beirut in the late 19th century.

== History ==
Beirut's city walls were mentioned by William of Tyre at the time of its first conquest by the Crusaders in 1110. A first city castle appears to have been built in 1183–1185, following Saladin's unsuccessful siege attempt in 1183 and probably under the leadership of Raymond III of Tripoli. By the time Saladin came back and successfully took over Beirut in 1187, the city castle was well documented by chroniclers. In 1197 the city was retaken by the Crusaders, and in 1198 it came under the rule of John of Ibelin. The castle was described in 1212 by Wilbrand of Oldenburg, following its refurbishment by John.

When Mamluk troops captured the city from the Crusaders in 1291, they partly demolished the fortifications, but the Mamluk Sultan Barquq built a new tower on the site in the late 14th century. In the 1770s, Jazzar Pasha destroyed part of the castle but then rebuilt the tower again. In 1840 during the Egyptian–Ottoman War, the castle was bombed and damaged by a British fleet. As evidenced by maps of that period, the old castle by then was known as "land castle" and the tower on an islet known as "sea castle."

In 1887, following decades of rapid economic expansion driven by trade liberalization and silk exports, the Municipality of Beirut obtained authorization from the Ottoman Empire to enlarge and modernize the Port of Beirut. All castle structures and the promontories on which they were built were entirely flattened between 1889 and 1895 to construct a road and railway that served the new port facilities, now Avenue Charles Helou. The area that had laid at the foot of the castle promontory became a market for bulk trade in grains, sugar, rice, coffee and tea, known as Souk Mal-al-Qabban.

Excavations conducted in 1995 in the context of development of Beirut Central District uncovered remains of the Beirut (Land) Castle’s basement.

== Description ==
The castle was built upon a promontory on the sea, to the north of the ancient Tell of Beirut and west of the present-day intersection of Charles Helou Avenue and Al-Shuhada Street. A separate fortification known as Burj al-Musallah was built on an islet that was located roughly on the intersection of Helou Avenue and Foch Street. In the Crusader period, a 6-meter-wide moat separated the southwestern tower from the lower city, thus protecting the castle from attacks.

== Gallery ==
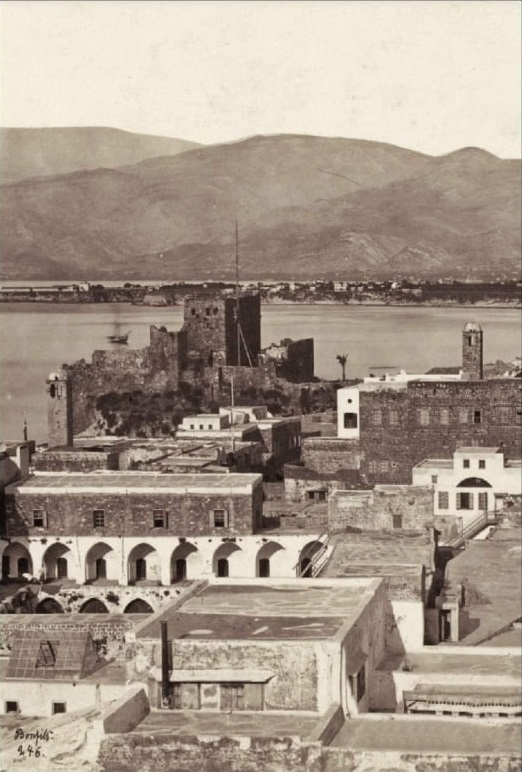
Sea Castle of Beirut in the 19th century

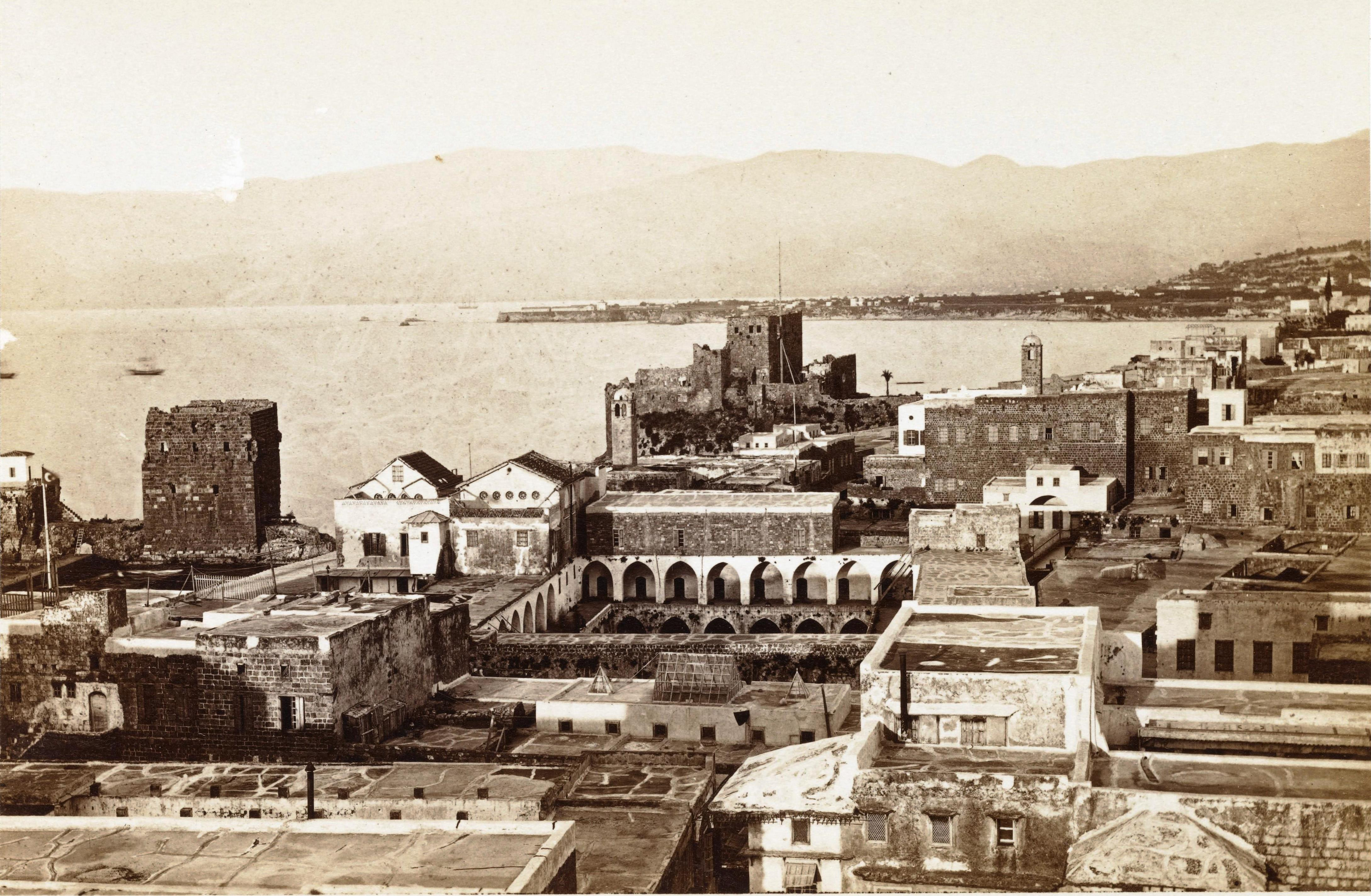
Photograph of Beirut Castle in December 1869 (center), with the tower of Burj-al-Musallah islet on the left

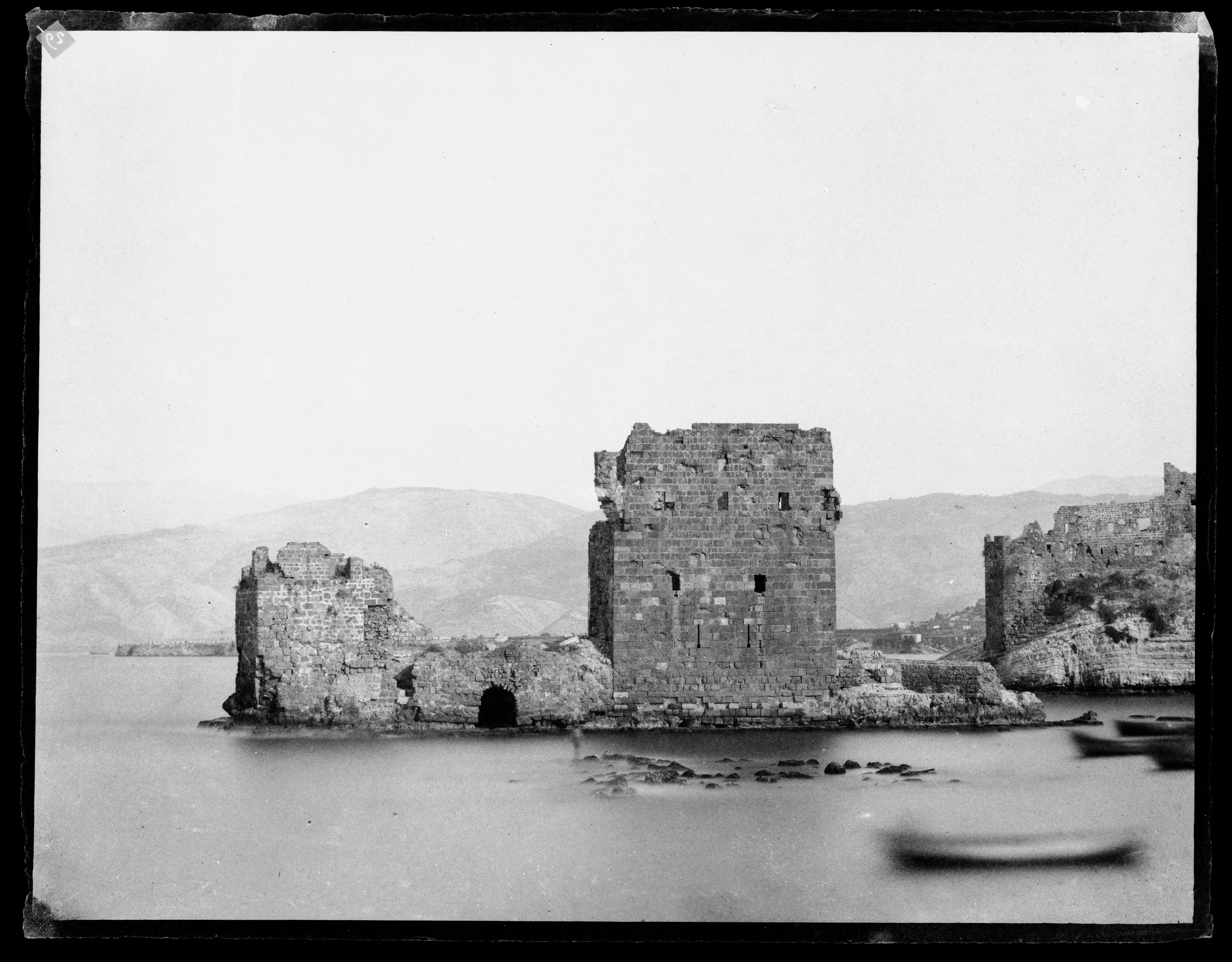
Louis Vignes' 1860 photograph of the castle ruins

== See also ==
- Castle Square, Beirut
- Byblos Castle
- Sidon Sea Castle
- List of Crusader castles
