= Beit Beirut =

Museum in Beirut, Lebanon

Beit Beirut بيت بيروت
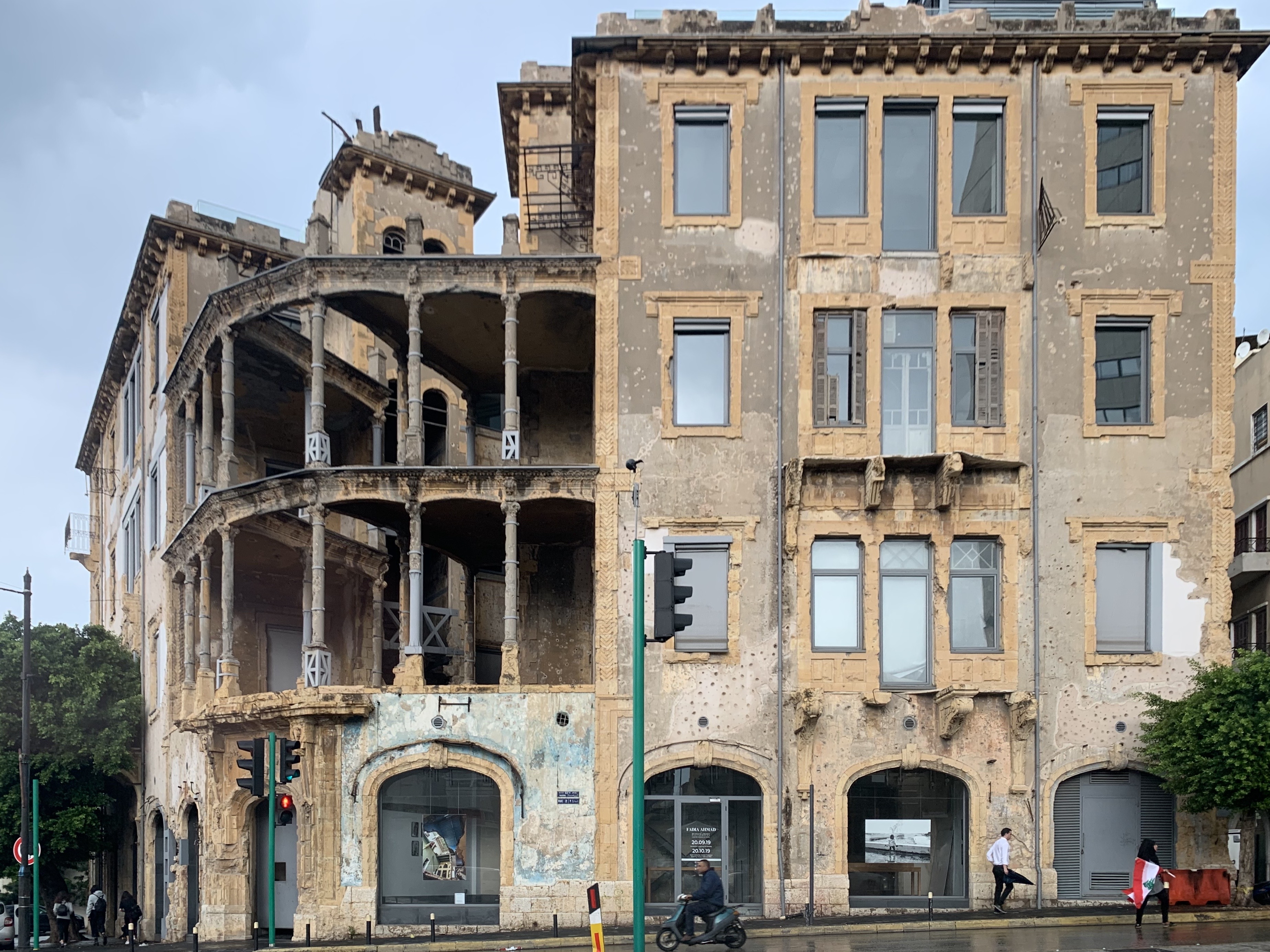
- Beit Beirut in 2019

- Location within Beirut Location within Lebanon
- Location: Beirut, Lebanon
- Coordinates: 33.886961°N 35.508395°E
- Website: beitbeirut.org

Beit Beirut (Arabic: بيت بيروت; literally "the house of Beirut") is a museum and urban cultural center dedicated to portraying the history of Beirut, with a particular focus on the Lebanese Civil War. Housed in the restored Barakat building, also known as the "Yellow House," this historic landmark was designed by Youssef Aftimus.

== History ==
The Barakat house was commissioned by Nicholas Barakat and his wife Victoria. Lebanese architect Youssef Aftimus, who designed Beirut's city hall, created and built the house in 1924. Architect Fouad Kozah added two more stories in 1932, giving the building its current form. Middle-class families inhabited the building's eight spacious apartments until the outbreak of the Lebanese civil war. Christian militiamen occupied the building afterward. The Barakat building served as a vantage point for snipers overlooking a combat zone. Its airy architecture and location on the demarcation line controlling the Sodeco crossroad made it strategically important.

The civil war devastated the Barakat building and neglect took its toll on the structure, which became the scene of repetitive acts of vandalism; it was sentenced for demolition in 1997 when the owners decided to sell the property. It was saved by Lebanese heritage activists, particularly architect Mona Hallak who first investigated the house in 1994 during one of her visits with the "Association pour la Protection des Sites et Anciennes Demeures au Liban" (APSAD), an independent organisation for the protection of historic monuments and buildings. Activists had articles about the structure published in the press almost on a daily basis, wrote petitions, and organized rallies in front of the building. Protestations finally led to the suspension of the decision to destroy the building. In 2003 the municipality of Beirut issued a decree of expropriation for public interest. The decree stated that the Barakat building will be restored to accommodate a memory museum and a cultural center (which will later be known as "Beit Beirut") with objects tracing the 7000-year history of the city. The decree also provisions the construction of a modern annex to the building on the empty lot around it, which will house offices of the municipality's urban planning department as well as an underground parking lot. The French government provided technical assistance to the Beirut municipality, but the cultural specialists who were supposed to visit and counsel on the museum's development were delayed because of the 2006 and 2007 Lebanon conflicts and political instability. The Beit Beirut project was delayed until the return of relative political stability in 2008. The project saw the collaboration between the municipality of Beirut, the City of Paris and the French embassy in Lebanon.

In 2009, Lebanese architect Youssef Haider was commissioned by the Beirut municipality to lead the building's restoration works. Even though Haidar had experience in rehabilitation as he had previously worked on the restoration of traditional buildings in downtown Beirut and Tripoli, his selection was contested since he was chosen without having recourse to an open competition. Haidar was assisted by a committee of architects formed by the Municipality of Paris; this committee has worked to develop the rehabilitation project of the museum and is formed by members from a variety of disciplines. (Note: The scientific committee is composed of May Hallak, architect Habib Debs (the former president of APSAD), Robert Saliba (who documented the architectural history of Beirut); in addition to representatives of the faculties of architecture in Lebanese universities, historians Serge Yazigi and Carla Edde , Sophie Broome who worked on the memory of the city in Paris, Lynn Maalouf, Frank Mérimée , the former director of the French Institute of the Near-East ifpo.) Beit Beirut was slated to open in 2013 but didn't open until April 28, 2016; planning and restoration costs amounted to 18 million US dollars. Beit Beirut temporarily re-opened to the public in August 2017, despite lacking staff, services and direction. The troubled opening of the museum was marred by unsettled questions about the contents of the exhibition and its narrative.

== Description ==
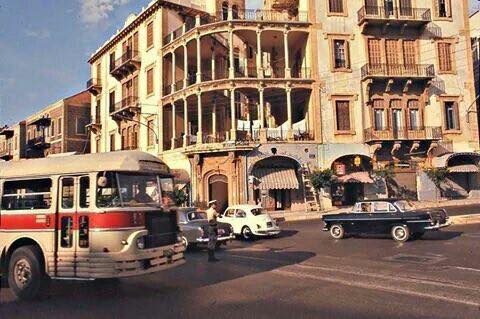
Barakat building in the 1960s

The Barakat building is built in the Ottoman revivalist style with ochre colored Deir el Qamar limestone which gave the building its name. The building consists of two four-story high-end residential blocks in addition to a roof terrace. The two blocks' facades are joined together by an open colonnade adorned with wrought iron work. The blocks are separated by a central atrium connecting to the main entrance to the landscaped garden in the backyard and to the buildings' staircases. The Barakat building stands on Damascus road, where a tramway station once stood.

== Significance and function ==
2016 VOA report about the Yellow House

During the reconstruction phase that followed the Lebanese civil war, many historically significant buildings were demolished. Activists were able to save a number of individual structures. The Barakat building with its bullet-peppered colonnade and façade became a dominant symbol of the civil war in Beirut. Historians and sociologists have observed that a Lebanese tendency to disremember the civil war and its episodes that don't figure in the Lebanese history curriculum. The last chapter in the Lebanese history textbooks address the withdrawal of French colonial forces from Lebanon in 1946. Lebanese intellectuals and architects lobbying to save the Barakat building argued that the creation of a collective memory and a unified account of the civil war would help the Lebanese to move forward and mend the societal divisions. In 2007, then Beirut's mayor Abdel Menem al-Aris affirmed that the prospected memory museum will showcase the city’s history and most notably the civil war. Although part the exterior is slated for renovation, the ground and first floors of the Barakat building's ruined façade will be kept in its decrepit state, to serve as a reminder of the city's wartime history. Bullet holes and sniper barricades are to be kept in their original places as well as the belongings of Fouad Chemali, a local dentist who occupied an apartment in the building's first floor since 1943. (Note: In the 1990s Mona Hallak had recovered the dentist's instruments, the love letters he exchanged with his Italian wife and his clothes that were left in the apartment after his death in 1973. The dentist's belongings were the subject of a cultural exposition in 2001.) The Beit Beirut second floor is to function as a permanent exhibition which recounts the history of Beirut from the nineteenth century onward. The upper floors house a multifunctional hall for temporary cultural, artistic and musical events.

== Other names ==
Initially known as Nicolas Barakat building, the structure was dubbed the Yellow House due to the yellow ochre color of the sandstone. The name of the building changed with the alteration of its function; it was called the building of death during the civil war. The cultural center hosted in the building was first called "Museum of memory" and "Beit al Madina" (the house of the city) before settling for "Beit Beirut" (the house of Beirut).
