= Rue Verdun =

Upscale commercial and residential street in Beirut, Lebanon

Coordinates: 33.8861°N 35.4836°E

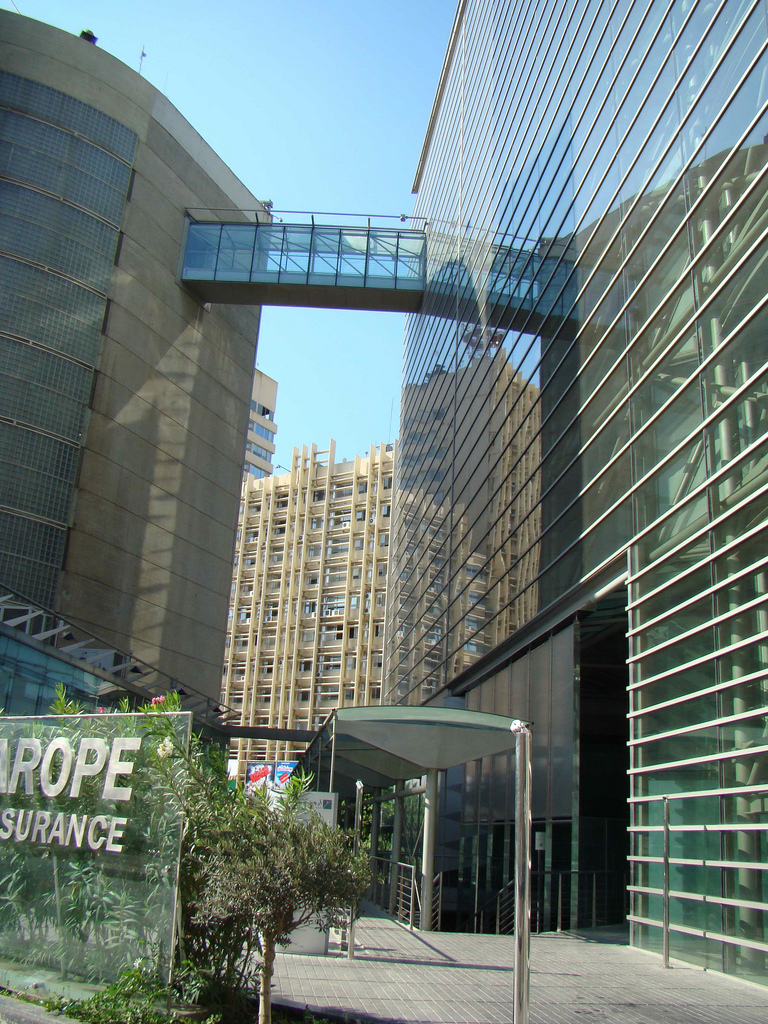
BLOM Bank Headquarters on Verdun

Rue Verdun, or Verdun Street (Arabic: شارع فردان, romanized: Shāriʿ Fardān), is an upscale commercial and residential street in Beirut, Lebanon. The street was named in honor of the Battle of Verdun during World War I. It is officially named Rachid Karami Street (شارع رشيد كرامي, Shāriʿ Rashīd Karāmī), after Lebanon's late Prime Minister who was assassinated during the Lebanese Civil War.

== Landmarks ==
- Lycée Franco-Libanais Verdun – a Francophone school.
- The Druze Center – the seat of the High Sheikh of the Druze sect in Lebanon.
- The Rashid Karami Memorial Statue – the street is named after him.

== Tourism ==
Verdun hosts a number of hotels, including:

- Four Points by Sheraton, located at the entrance of Rue Verdun.
- Radisson Blu Hotel Verdun, situated near the Dunes Center.
- Bristol Hotel, at the intersection of Verdun and Hamra.
- Staybridge Suites, a hotel chain near the intersection of Verdun and Iben Rouchoud.

Verdun is home to some major fashion boutiques, retail chains and the large ABC shopping center. The street also has restaurants, cafes and coffee shops. There is little nightlife, with few or no clubs and bars in the area.

== Gallery ==
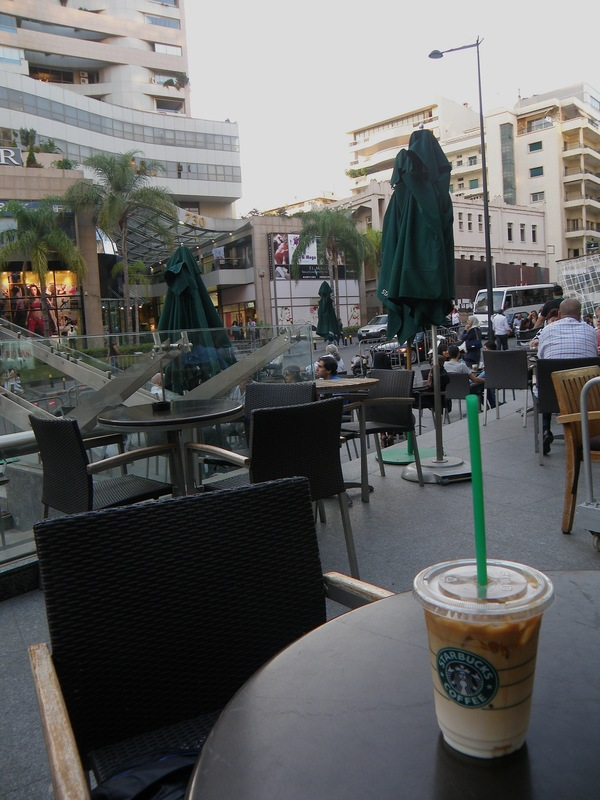
Sidewalk Cafes along Verdun Street

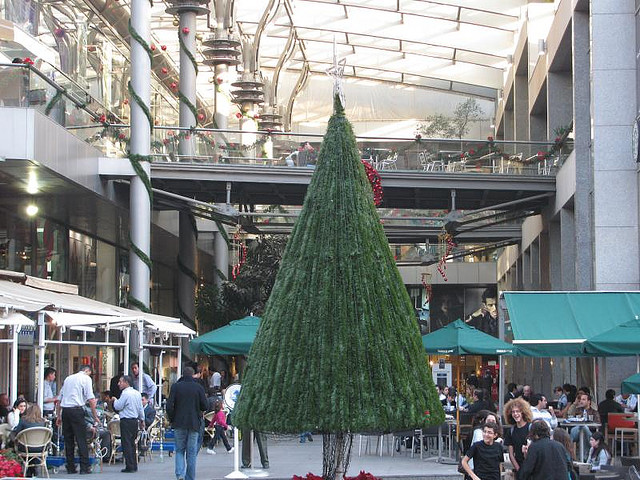
Christmas decorations on Verdun Street

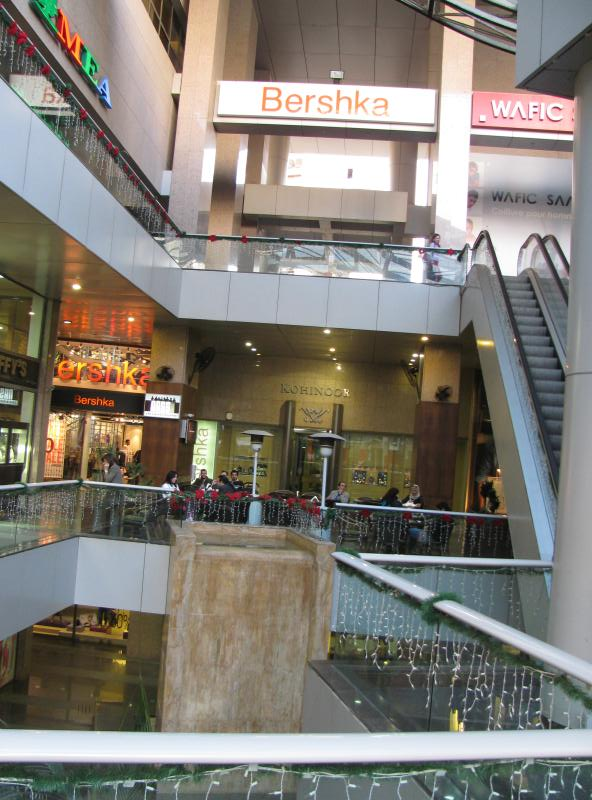
The interior of a Verdun shopping center

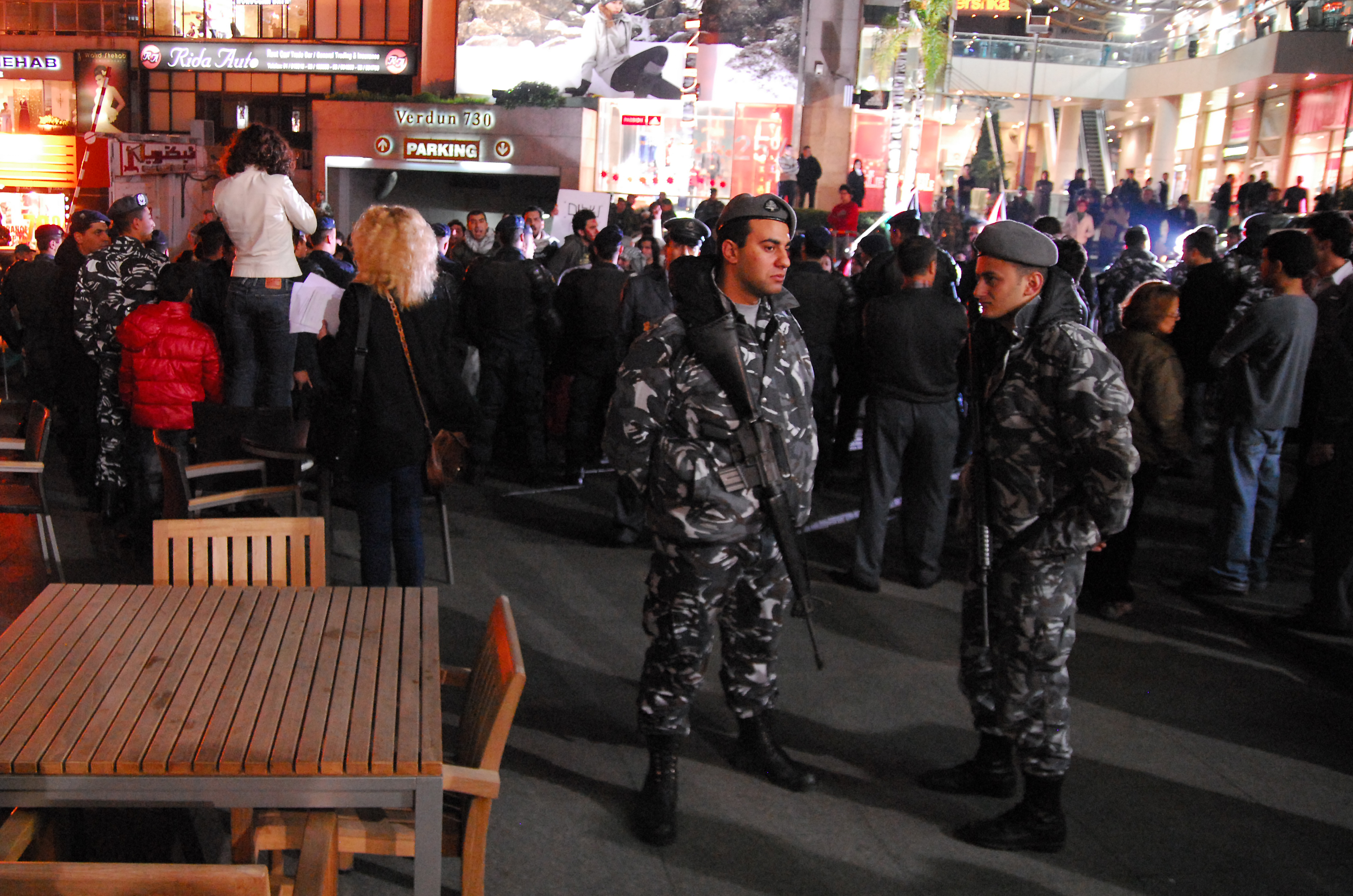
Security guards on a shopping center entrance

== See also ==
- Beirut Central District
