= Trablos Street =

Street in Lebanon

Trablos Street is located in Beirut, Lebanon.

== Overview ==
In the 19th century, Trablos street was used as a carriage station for travelers to and from Tripoli. Until 1975, the street maintained its role as an important commercial thoroughfare.

== Construction ==
In the 19th century, Trablos Street was used as a carriage station for travelers to and from Tripoli (Trablos in Arabic). The station later moved to Sahat al Bourj. In the first half of the 20th century, newspaper offices began operating on Trablos Street. The opening of the Ajami restaurant in 1920 further transformed this street. Trablos Street maintained its role as an important commercial thoroughfare until 1975.

== History ==
In the 19th century, Trablos Street was used as a carriage station for travelers to and from Tripoli (Trablos in Arabic). With the coming of the automobile, the station moved to Sahat al-Burj (later Martyrs’ Square). In the first half of the 20th century, newspaper offices began operating on Trablos Street: French daily L’Orient settled there in 1924. Soon after, Arabic newspaper An-Nahar established itself in a building on the corner of Souk Ayass and Trablos Street. That same corner became well known as home to Al-Ajami restaurant. Opened in 1920 as a small tea house, it soon became a popular destination with politicians, journalists, artists, tourists, and families crowding in at all hours of the day and night to savor special Lebanese dishes and desserts. In the early 1970s, the Ministry of Tourism and the Municipality of Beirut gave the corner the name of ‘Al-Ajami Square’ in honor of the famous restaurant. Although it never became the established press center of Beirut, Trablos Street maintained its role as an important commercial thoroughfare until 1975.

== Timeline ==
19th century: Street used as a carriage station for travelers to and from Tripoli.

1920: Opening of Al-Ajami restaurant.

1924: French daily l'Orient followed by Arabic newspaper An-Nahar settled on Trablos Street.

1970: The street corner named Al-Ajami Square in honour of the restaurant.

1975: Trablos Street maintained its role as an important commercial thoroughfare.

== See also ==
- Sahat al-Burj
- Martyrs' Square
- L'Orient
- An-Nahar
- Al-Ajami Restaurant
- Beirut Souks
- Al-Majidiyyeh Mosque
