= Youssef Aftimus =

Ottoman civil engineer and architect from Mount Lebanon

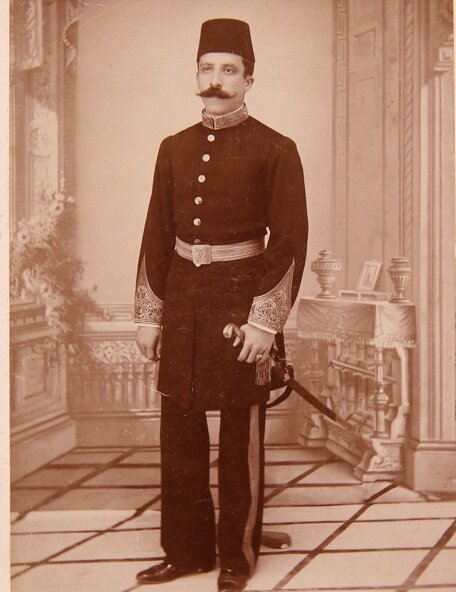
- Born: November 25, 1866; Deir el Qamar, Chouf, Ottoman Empire
- Died: September 10, 1952
- Occupation: Architect
- Spouse: Rose Bechara
- Buildings: Beirut City Hall and Hamidiyyeh Clock Tower

Youssef Aftimus (Arabic: يوسف أفتيموس; 25 November 1866 – 10 September 1952) was a Lebanese civil engineer and architect who specialized in Moorish Revival architecture. Aftimus was the leading Lebanese architect and urban planner during the first half of the twentieth century, he is the author of many of Beirut's well known landmarks such as the Beirut Municipality Building, the Grand Serail's Hamidiyyeh clock tower, the Hamidiyyeh Fountain and the Barakat Building. Aftimus was also an urban planner, and politician and philanthropist.

== Early life ==
Youssef Aftimus was born on November 25, 1866, to a Greek Catholic family in the historic town of Deir el Qamar. He attended school at Collège des Frères Maristes in his hometown as of 1875. In 1879 he transferred to the Syrian Protestant College to complete his studies, and graduated with a Bachelor of Arts degree. Aftimus taught Arabic at his alma mater for two years and co-authored an Arabic grammar textbook, In 1885 he moved to New York City to study civil engineering at the Union College; graduating in 1891. His first job was with the Pennsylvania Railroad Company, where he worked on the Hudson Canal and the Pennsylvania Railways. He was later recruited by the Thomson-Houston Electric Company, and then by General Electric.

In 1893 Aftimus worked for a pioneer in Moorish revival architecture and was chosen to design the "Persian Palace", "Turkish Village" and "Cairo Street" pavilions for the 1893 World's Columbian Exposition in Chicago. Cairo Street was a particularly popular attraction in the fair. Aftimus went on to work on the Egyptian pavilion at the Antwerp International Exposition of 1894 and the following year he went to Berlin on an extensive research trip on construction engineering before returning to Beirut in late 1896. In 1898 Youssef was recruited by the Municipality of Beirut as municipal engineer and he directed the construction of the Grand Serail Clock tower. During his work in Beirut he met Manouk Avedissian, better known as Bechara Effendi al-Muhandes, his future father-in-law. He married Rose Avedissian on May 1, 1899.

== Career ==
=== Career in Lebanon ===
Between 1898 and 1903, Youssef Aftimus became an engineer of the Municipality of Beirut, he designed the Hamidiyyeh Fountain in 1900 which was dedicated by the Beirut Municipality to Sultan Abdelhamid II. The fountain, originally on Riad el-Solh/as-Sour square was later moved and is still presently in the Sanayeh park. In 1911, Aftimus founded a consultant office in partnership with Emile Kacho who was also an engineer. Aftimus won the design competition for Beirut's City Hall in 1923, the municipal building still stands at Weygand and Foch crossroad. Aftimus served as the minister of public works in the 1926-1927 government led by Auguste Basha Adib.

In addition to his engineering works, Aftimos published an architectural treaties on Arabic architecture entitled "العرب في فن البناء"; he was also elected a member of the Damascus-based Arab Academy and president of the Syrian Protestant College alumni association. Aftimus helped found and headed a non-profit charity organization aiming to eliminate tuberculosis.

==== Other works ====
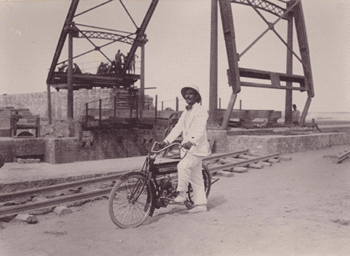
Youssef Aftimus - Upper Egypt - 1903

- 1920 Damour: Old Damour river bridge (bombarded in 1941)
- 1923 Beirut City Hall
- 1924 Nabatiyeh: drinking water supply
- 1924 Nicolas Barakat building
- 1925 Buildings in the Hotel-Dieu de France hospital
- 1927 Construction of Aftimus House (Kantari)
- 1929 Conference on Arab Architecture. (Death of his son Fouad Aftimus).
- 1929 Issa building (Trad Hospital), housing the US consulate.
- 1929 Grand Theatre des Milles et Une Nuits in Beirut
- 1932 Zouheir building (Haïgazian University)
- 1933 Beirut Municipality building, Sage Hall, Beirut University College (BUC).

==== Unrealized projects ====
- 1935 unbuilt project for a Greek Catholic cathedral.

=== Works abroad ===
- 1903 irrigation projects in Upper-Egypt for the Egyptian government
- 1910 Iran: works in the north of the country

== Impact ==
The end of the 19th century saw an Ottoman cultural revivalist movement aiming at defining an architectural Ottoman style which was sparked by the publishing in 1873 of Usul-i Mimari-i Osmani (Principles of Ottoman Architecture), commissioned by Ibrahim Edhem Pasha. Ottoman architectural revivalism was very eclectic and drew upon many styles including Ottoman Baroque (see Ottoman architecture), modern Islamic architecture, vernacular Beaux-Arts, Neoclassicism. Aftimus' participation in the Chicago world fair was his break as an Ottoman revivalist architect. Although he had little knowledge of Istanbul's architectural culture, his expatriate work for the Ottoman government familiarized him with particular trends in the Ottoman capital. Aftimus introduced this Ottoman revivalist style from Istanbul and from the Chicago World's Columbian Exposition to Beirut by the end of the 19th century; his architectural influence would later dominate Beirut's public constructions in the last two decades of Ottoman rule over Lebanon.

== The "Yellow House" ==
The Barakat mansion also known as the "Yellow House" was designed by Aftimus and was slated for demolition in 1997 since it was heavily damaged during the Lebanese Civil War. The mansion is located in Achrafieh's Sodeco area, intersecting the civil war demarcation line. It was saved by Lebanese activists (particularly the architect Mona Hallak) who had articles about the mansion published in the press almost on a daily basis, wrote petitions, and organized rallies in front of the building. In 2000, Atelier de Recherche ALBA produced a large-scale installation based on narratives from this building and its neighborhood. Protests finally led to the suspension of the decision to destroy the building in 2003 and the municipality of Beirut decided to acquire it in order to install a city memory museum with artifacts tracing the 7,000-year history of the city. The municipality obtained support from the government of France to advance the restoration. The museum, known as Beit Beirut (the House of Beirut), was inaugurated in 2017 on the eve of the anniversary commemorating the Lebanese Civil War.

== Gallery ==
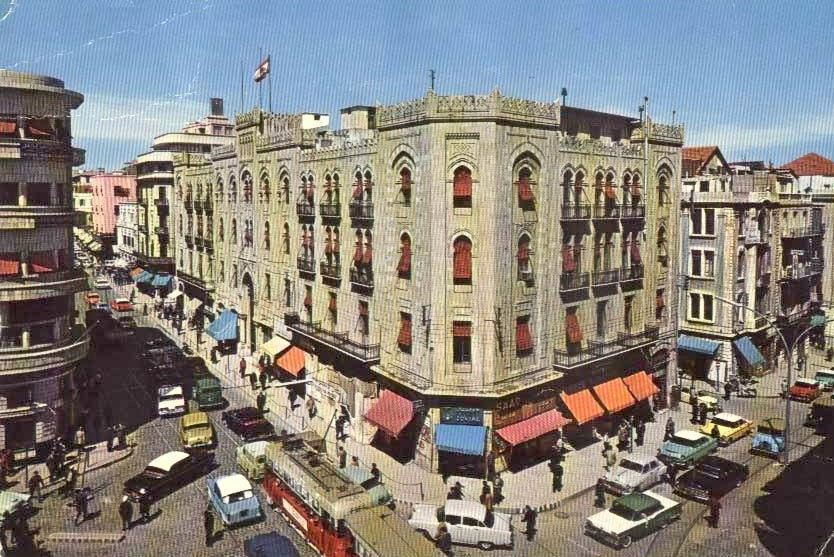
Beirut city hall in 1960

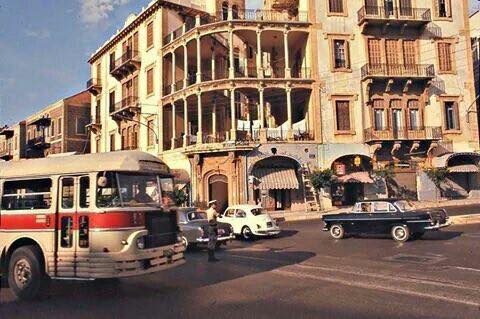
Nicolas Barakat in the 1960s, now Beit Beirut

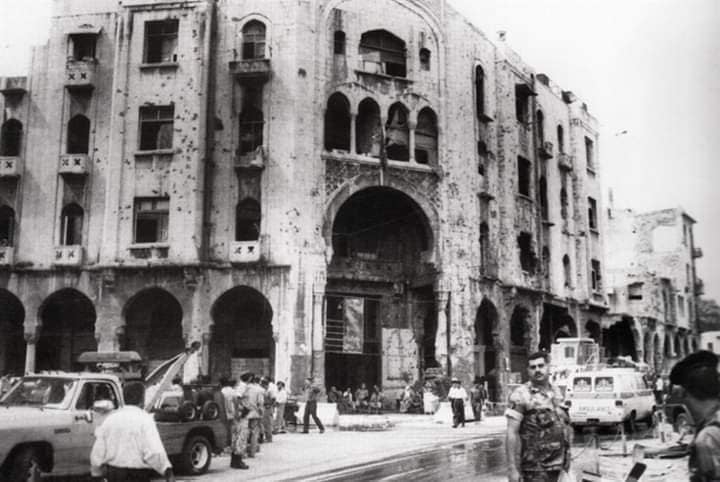
Grand Théâtre des Mille et Une Nuits in the 1980s

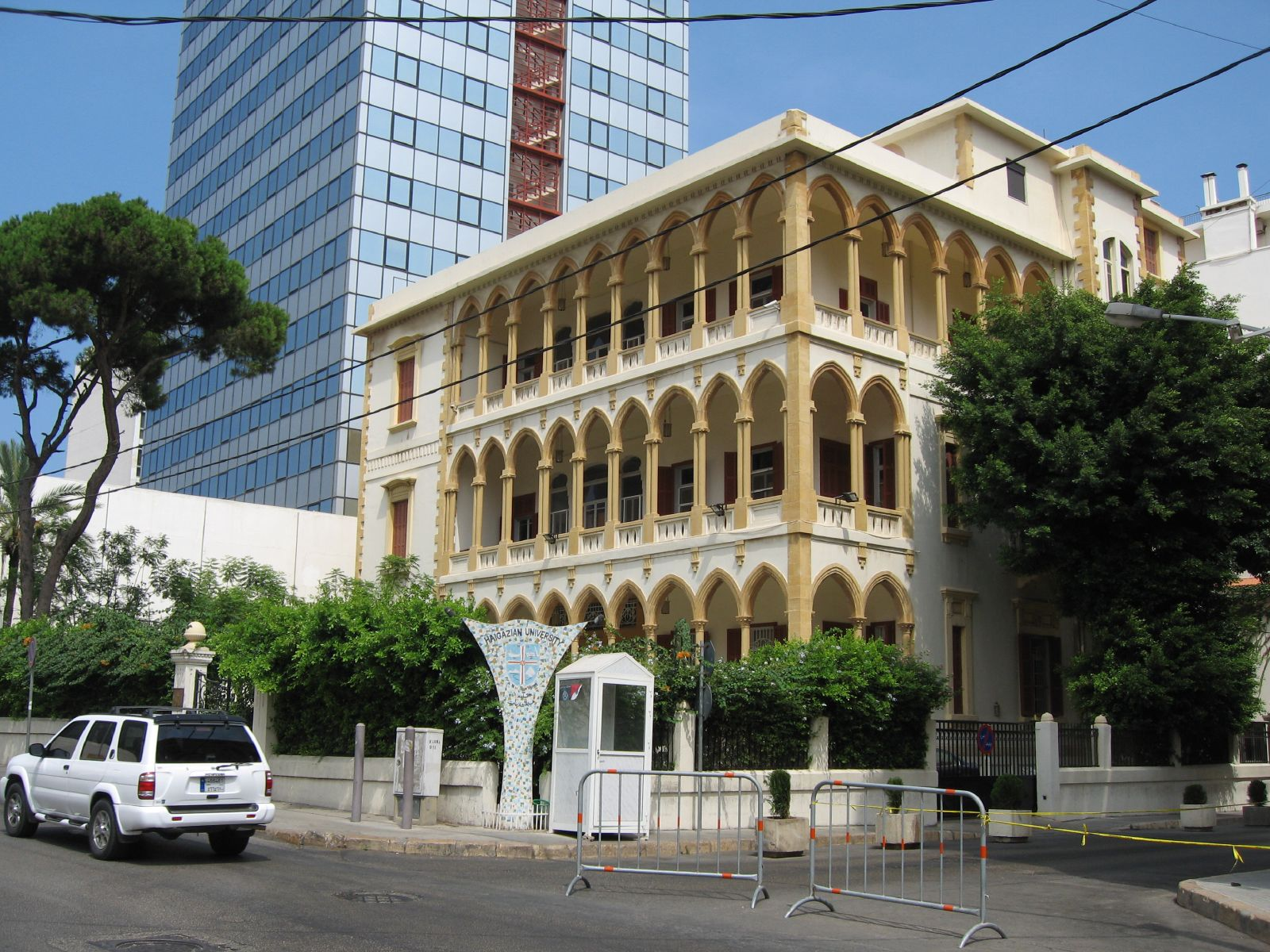
Haigazian University

== See also ==
- Mardiros Altounian – Armenian-Lebanese architect (1889–1958)
- List of Lebanese architects
