= Lycée Franco-Libanais Verdun =

Lycée Verdun

Location
- Rue Verdun; Beirut; Lebanon
- Coordinates: 33.8848°N 35.4827°E

Information
- Type: Private school
- Established: 1951
- Founder: AEFE
- Administrator: Benoît Ghewy
- Principal: Philippe Bidet
- Grades: 1 - 12
- Yearbook: Yearly
- Affiliations: AEFE, MLF
- Languages: French, Arabic, English, Spanish
- Website: lycee-verdun.edu.lb

The Lycée Franco-Libanais Verdun (Arabic: اللیسیه الفرنسیة اللبنانیة - فردان), commonly known as the Lycée Verdun, is a French lycée located in the Rue Verdun in Beirut, Lebanon. It was founded in 1951 by the Agence pour l'enseignement français à l'étranger, a French governmental organization which operates French lycées around the world.

The school follows both the official French curriculum of study which prepares the students to take the French general baccalauréat, and the Lebanese curriculum which prepares students for the Lebanese baccalauréat. 1999 marked the first year in which Terminale (12th grade) students graduated from the school.
