= Restoration of Beirut =

The Master Plan, completed and approved in 1994, set up the guidelines for the conservation and restoration of some 291 buildings identified as buildings to be preserved and restored.

== Construction ==
In 1993, 291 buildings were identified as buildings to be preserved and restored. Mainly concentrated in the Etoile and Foch-Allenby districts, Saifi Village and Wadi Abu Jamil, the retained buildings were to be restored following the Master Plan guidelines. The Master Plan was completed and approved in 1994 by a decree emanating from the Council of Ministers. Retained buildings were divided into three categories: governmental and religious, buildings of heritage and architectural value (to be restored without external alteration) and ‘other category’ buildings (only limited alterations and additions were permitted). While buildings of heritage value had to be restored without external alteration, only limited alterations and additions were permitted for the ‘other category’ buildings.

== History ==
In 1993, 291 buildings were identified as buildings to be preserved and restored out of nearly 900 buildings left standing after the war. Many of the surviving heritage buildings were in a hazardous and dilapidated state mainly due to small arms fire and subsequent deterioration. The main concentrations of retained buildings were in the Etoile and Foch-Allenby districts of Beirut’s historic core, Saifi Village and Wadi Abu Jamil. The Master Plan, completed and approved by a decree emanating from the Council of Ministers in 1994, outlined the restoration of the retained buildings. Buildings identified for preservation were divided into three categories: governmental and religious, buildings of heritage and architectural value and ‘other category’ buildings. These were mainly modern structures in salvageable state. Buildings of heritage value had to be restored without external alteration, while limited alterations and additions were permitted for ‘other category’ buildings.

== Timeline ==
1993: Identification of 291 buildings as buildings to be preserved and restored.

1994: Completion and approval of the Master Plan by a decree emanating from the Council of Ministers, which outlined the restoration of the retained buildings.

== See also ==
- Saifi Village
- Wadi Abu Jamil
- Solidere
- Beirut Central District
- Etoile Square
- Lebanese Civil War
