= Al-Majidiyyeh Mosque =

Mosque in Beirut, Lebanon

- Arabic: جامع المجيدية
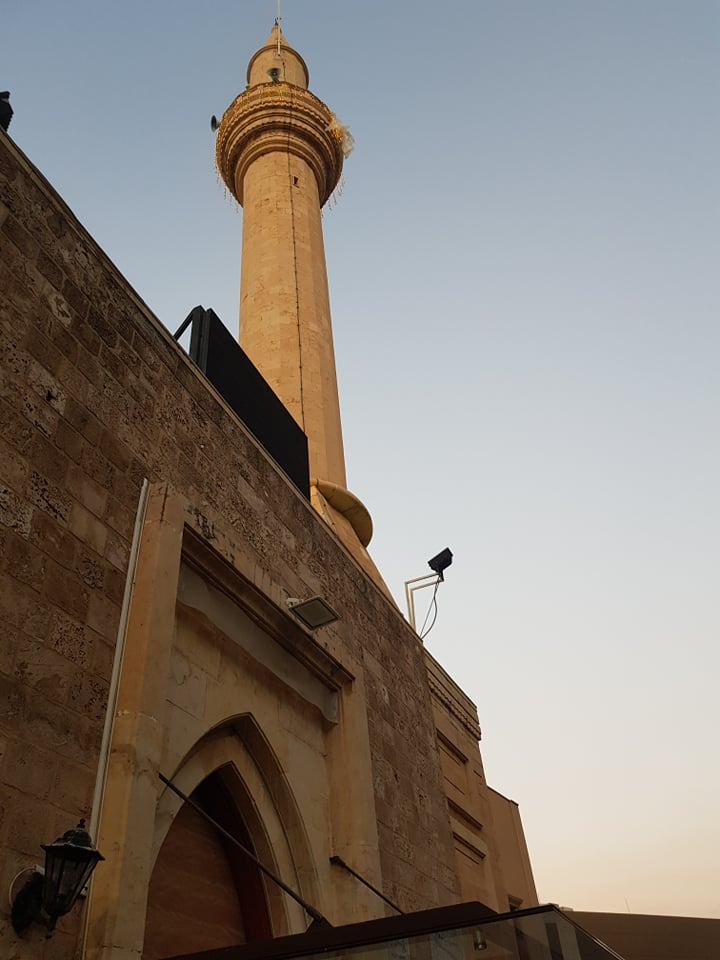
- The minaret of the mosque in 2010

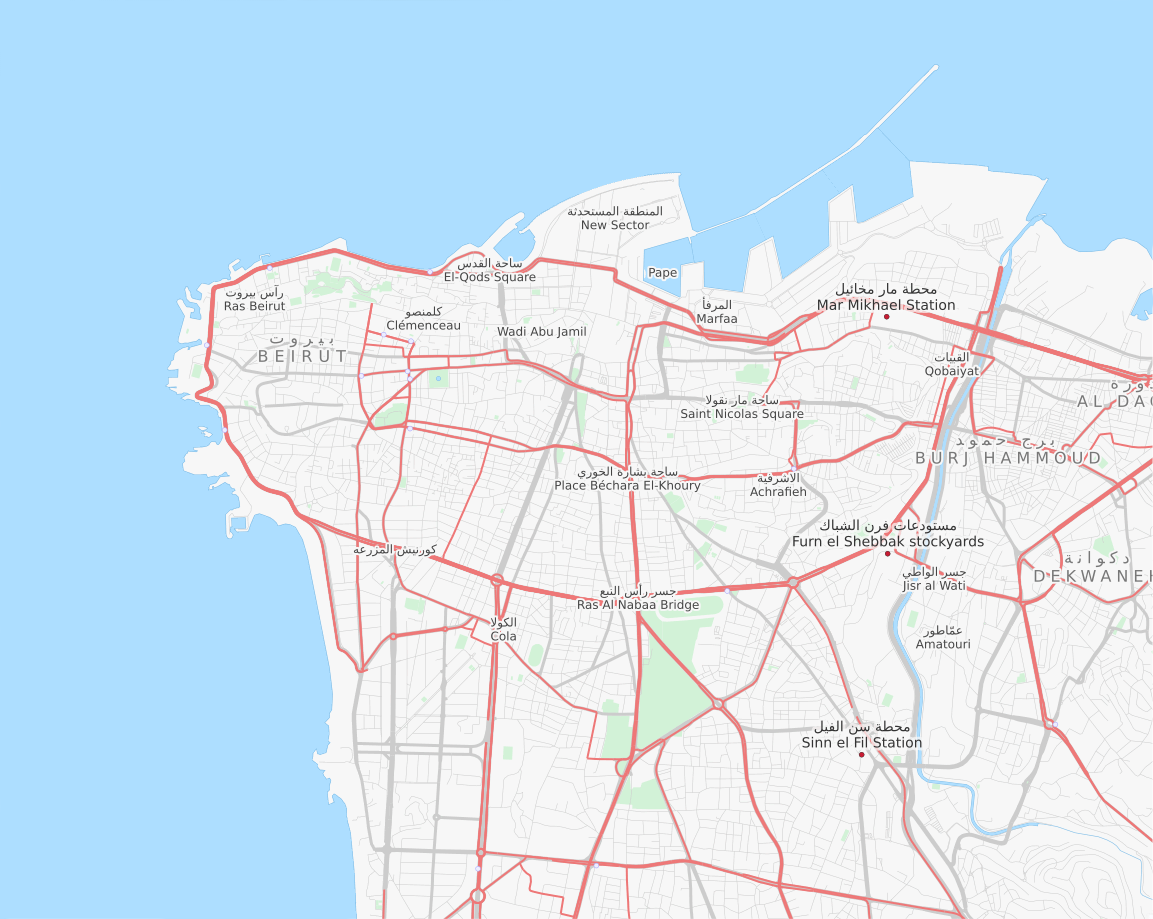
- Location within Beirut

Religion
- Affiliation: Islam
- Ecclesiastical or organizational status: Profane use (from 12th century); Mosque (since 1844)
- Status: Active

Location
- Location: Beirut
- Country: Lebanon
- Interactive map of Al-Majidiyyeh Mosque
- Coordinates: 33°54′3.1″N 35°30′15.9″E

Architecture
- Type: Mosque architecture
- Style: Ottoman
- Completed: 12th century (as a fort); 1844 (as a mosque)
- Minaret: One

The Al-Majidiyyeh Mosque (Arabic: جامع المجيدية) is a mosque, located in Beirut, Lebanon. Originally a fort, the building was converted into a mosque in the mid-19th century and named after Sultan Abdul Majid. Damaged during the Lebanese Civil War, the mosque was restored in 2004.

== History ==
Originally a fort overlooking the harbor, the fort formed an integral part of the city ramparts. Deserted, it then served as an Ottoman army munitions magazine and as a warehouse used by wood merchants.

In 1841, a group of Beirut citizens collected funds to restore the building, adding a new structure on its western side. In 1844, the building was converted it into a mosque, and named it ‘Al-Majidiyyeh,’ in honor of Sultan Abdul Majid. The mosque was enlarged in 1906 when pointed arches - fashionable in Beirut at the end of the 19th century – were added to its façade.

In 1974, the monument was entirely renovated. Its location between Khan Antoun Bey and Souk Al-Tawileh made it very vulnerable and the mosque was severely damaged during the early years of the Civil War (1975–1990). Post-war restoration started in 2000 and was completed in 2004. It included the reinstatement of an entrance from Khan Antoun Bey Square and the addition of a new, taller minaret.

== See also ==
- Islam in Lebanon
- List of mosques in Lebanon
- Trablos Street
- Beirut Souks
- Souk al-Tawileh
