= Harbor Square, Beirut =

Square in Beirut, Lebanon

Harbor Square is a square in Beirut, Lebanon.

== Overview ==
Beirut Port originated as a natural harbor. The harbor then developed in Ottoman times, and was enlarged during the French Mandate and Independence era.

== Construction ==
Beirut Port originated as a natural harbor, protected by the Ras Beirut promontory. From about 2500 B.C., inhabitants of the Tell worked the bedrock to create the first harbor facilities, allowing small boats to be pulled ashore, while larger ships anchored in relative safety. Over the years, the harbor slowly developed until the 1830s, when Ibrahim Pasha initiated the first harbor project by creating an enclosed basin for lighters. Although the inauguration of Khan Antoun Bey in 1853 led to some modernization of Beirut Port, the rapid expansion of maritime trade following the construction of the Suez Canal (1859-1871) called for a more ambitious response. In 1887, after years of negotiations and with the backing of French investors, permission was granted for the enlargement and modernization of the harbor. In 1888, the ‘Compagnie impériale ottomane du Port, des Quais et des Entrepôts de Beyrouth’ was founded in Paris. The resulting Ottoman Wall was a significant engineering feat in its day. Under the French Mandate, a new jetty extended the Ottoman Wall another 800 meters into the sea, thus creating the largest harbor in the Eastern Mediterranean. Throughout the 20th century, Beirut kept its monopoly over maritime transit trade, while two more basins were added to the harbor complex.

== History ==
Beirut Port originated as a natural harbor, protected by the Ras Beirut promontory. This setting provided sailing ships with easy access and shelter from southwesterly winds. From about 2500 B.C., inhabitants of the Tell worked the bedrock to create the first harbor facilities, allowing small boats to be pulled ashore, while larger ships anchored in relative safety. In the Canaanite and Phoenician periods, two harbors were formed from rocky inlets near the ancient Tell. A well-protected harbor to the northeast and a sheltered natural basin southwest of the castle's cliff offered safe anchorage in almost any wind conditions. Both still existed in Hellenistic times. Roman engineers enlarged the western basin with concrete seawalls, and the harbor extended halfway into the modern Foch-Allenby District. Later, in the 17th century, larger vessels were not able to enter the basin. They had to have their cargoes shipped ashore in lighters or small barges. In the 1830s, Ibrahim Pasha initiated the first harbor project by creating an enclosed basin for lighters, next to the harbor's southern quay. Although the inauguration of Khan Antoun Bey in 1853 led to some modernization of Beirut Port, the rapid expansion of maritime trade following the construction of the Suez Canal (1859-1871) called for a more ambitious response. In 1879, the Beirut Municipality sought a special decree from the Ottoman authorities in Istanbul to enlarge and modernize the harbor. In 1887, after years of negotiations and with the backing of French investors, permission was granted. In 1888, the ‘Compagnie impériale ottomane du Port, des Quais et des Entrepôts de Beyrouth’ was founded in Paris. The resulting Ottoman Wall that enclosed the First Basin and the previous harbors was a significant engineering feat in its day.

== Timeline ==
About 2500 BC: Creation of the first harbor facilities.

1830s: Initiation of the first harbor project by Ibrahim Pasha.

1853: Inauguration of Khan Antoun Bey which led to some modernization of Beirut Port.

1859-1871: Expansion of maritime trade following the construction of the Suez Canal called for a more ambitious project of modernization within the port.

1879: The Beirut Municipality sought a special decree from the Ottoman authorities in Istanbul to enlarge and modernize the harbor.

1887: Permission was granted for the enlargement and modernization of the harbor.

1888: Foundation of the ‘Compagnie impériale ottomane du Port, des Quais et des Entrepôts de Beyrouth’ in Paris.

== See also ==
- Beirut Port
- Ras Beirut Promontory
- Ancient Tell
- Canaanite
- Phoenician
- Roman Berytus
- Foch-Allenby District
- Khan Antoun Bey
- Suez Canal
- Ottoman
- Compagnie impériale ottomane du Port, des Quais et des Entrepôts de Beyrouth
- French Mandate
