= ABC (Lebanon) =

Shopping mall operator in Lebanon

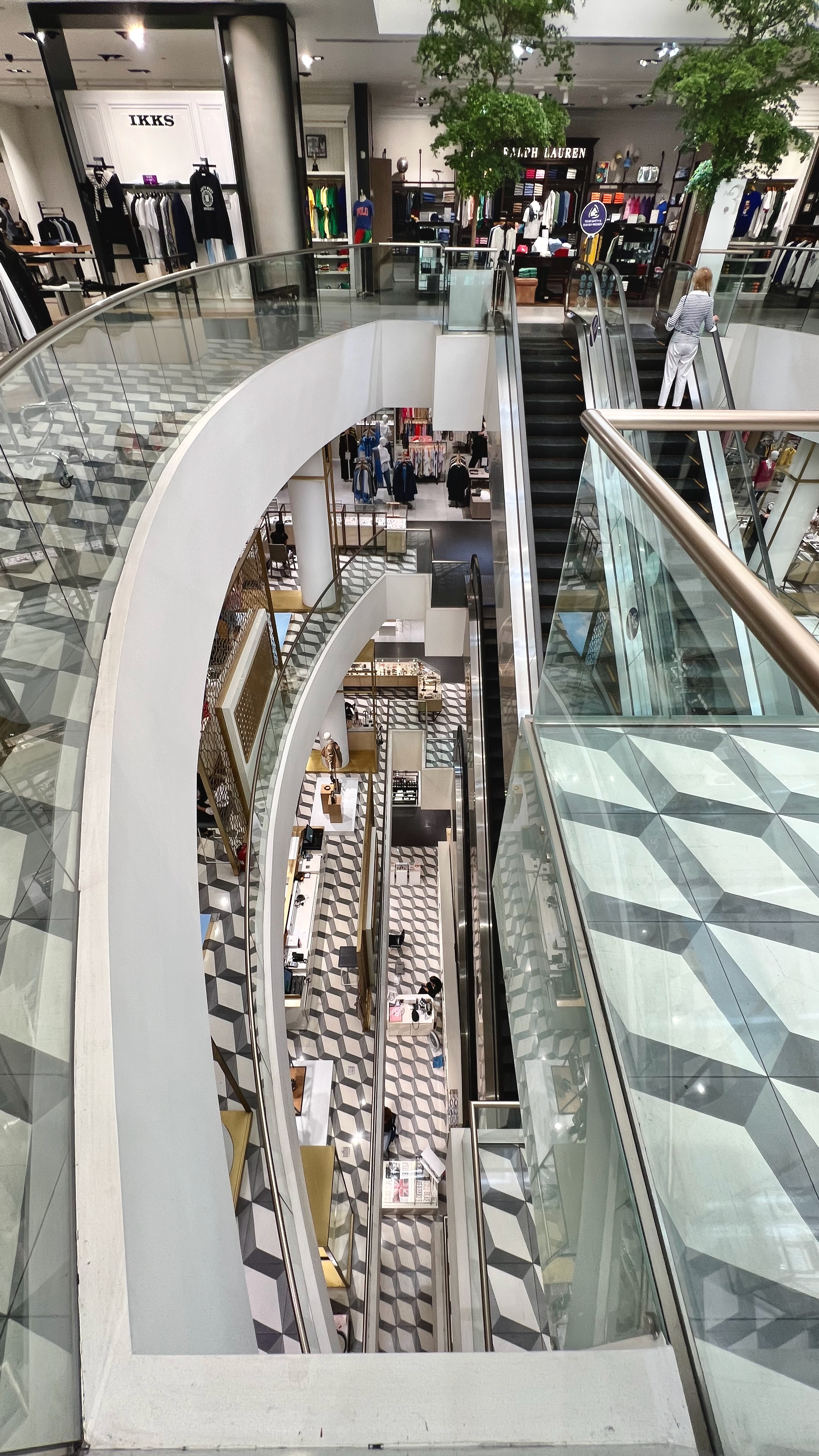
ABC department store Achrafieh 2022

ABC (legal name: ABC s.a.l. alias ABC Group, LinkedIn: ABC Lebanon), is a company operating ABC-branded shopping malls and department stores, as well as individual boutiques of fashion brands, in Lebanon with a total gross leasable area of 115,000 m^{2} (1,240,000 sq ft).

The business dates back to 1936 with the opening of ABC at Bab Idriss Square, central Beirut, 580 m^{2} (6,200 sq ft) in size, followed by ABC Bab Borj at 350 m^{2} (3,800 sq ft) in 1940, and ABC Hamra 415 m^{2} (4,470 sq ft) in 1948.

Robert Fadel served as Chairman & CEO from 2009 to 2017, and remains a member of the board of directors. The Harvard Business School case “From Beirut with Love” summarized his experience as head of ABC, his family business.

== Innovations ==
ABC claims many innovations in Lebanese and Middle Eastern retail, such as fixed prices (when bargaining was the tradition), employing women in its sales force, advertising, opening the Middle East's first "international standard" open-air mall, banning smoking, implementing waste management, opening the largest private photovoltaic plant in Lebanon and introducing magnetic gift cards.

== Locations ==
Name	Opened	Closed	Shopping center		ABC Dept. Store		Mall stores	Movie theater (screens)	Parking spaces	Cafés and restaurants	Notes
Name	Opened	Closed	Gross leasable area	Built-up area	Gross leasable area	Built-up area	Mall stores	Movie theater (screens)	Parking spaces	Cafés and restaurants	Notes
ABC Verdun	2017	open	50,000	155,500	6,463	10,600	200+	11	1,700	16	
ABC Achrafieh	2003	open	40,000	126,500	7,800	13,500	105	7	1,200	21	
ABC Dbayeh	1979	open	25,280	44,250	24,157	44,275	285	8		12 (mall), 13 (dept. store)	
ABC Furn El Chebbak	1994	closed									
ABC Kaslik	1978	closed									
ABC Zahlé	1973	now outlet			415						
ABC Hamra	1948	now outlet			415						
ABC Bab Borj	1940	closed			350						
ABC Bab Idriss	1936	closed			580						
ABC Tripoli (outlet)		closed									

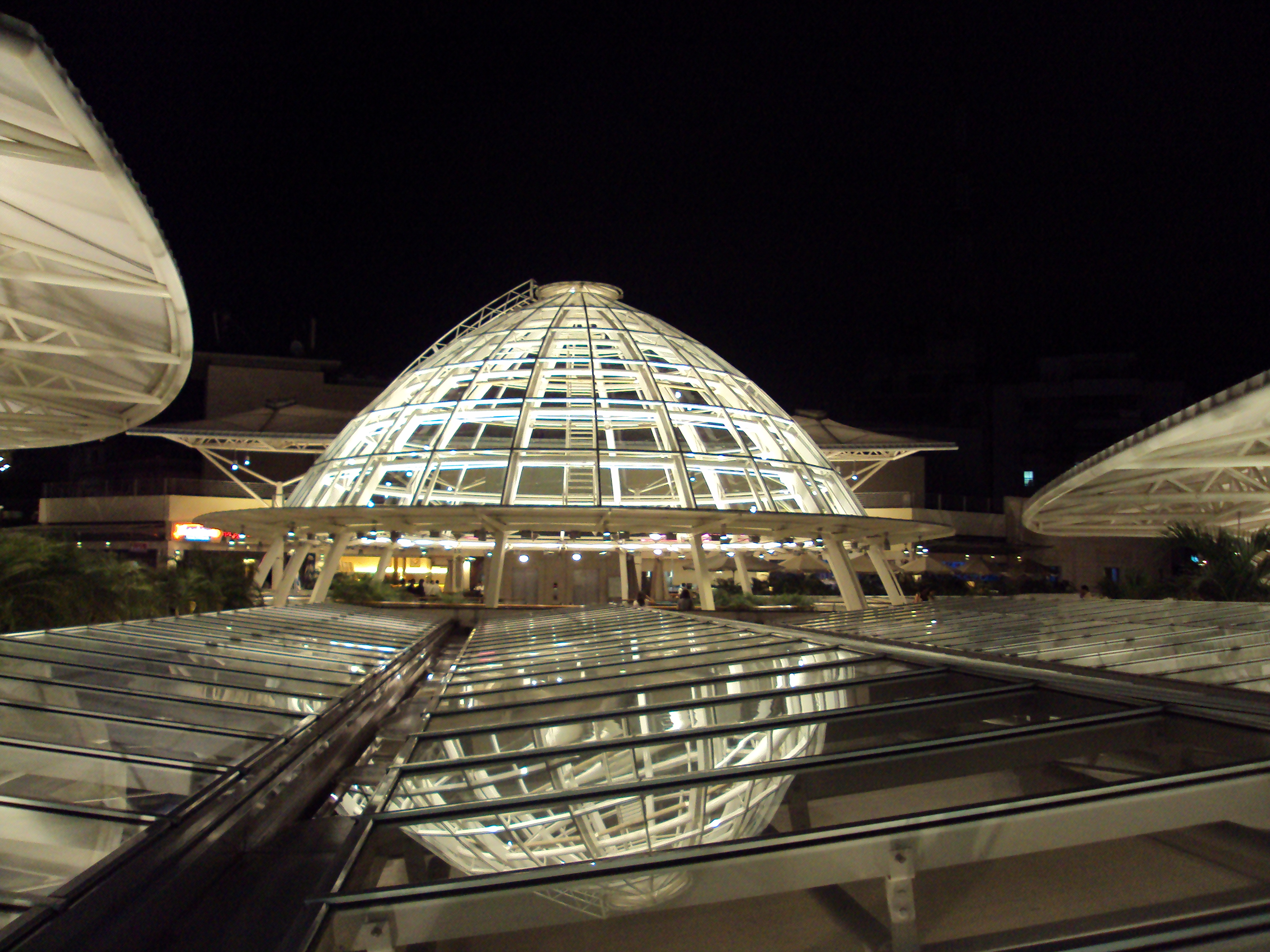
Top floor ABC Achrafieh mall

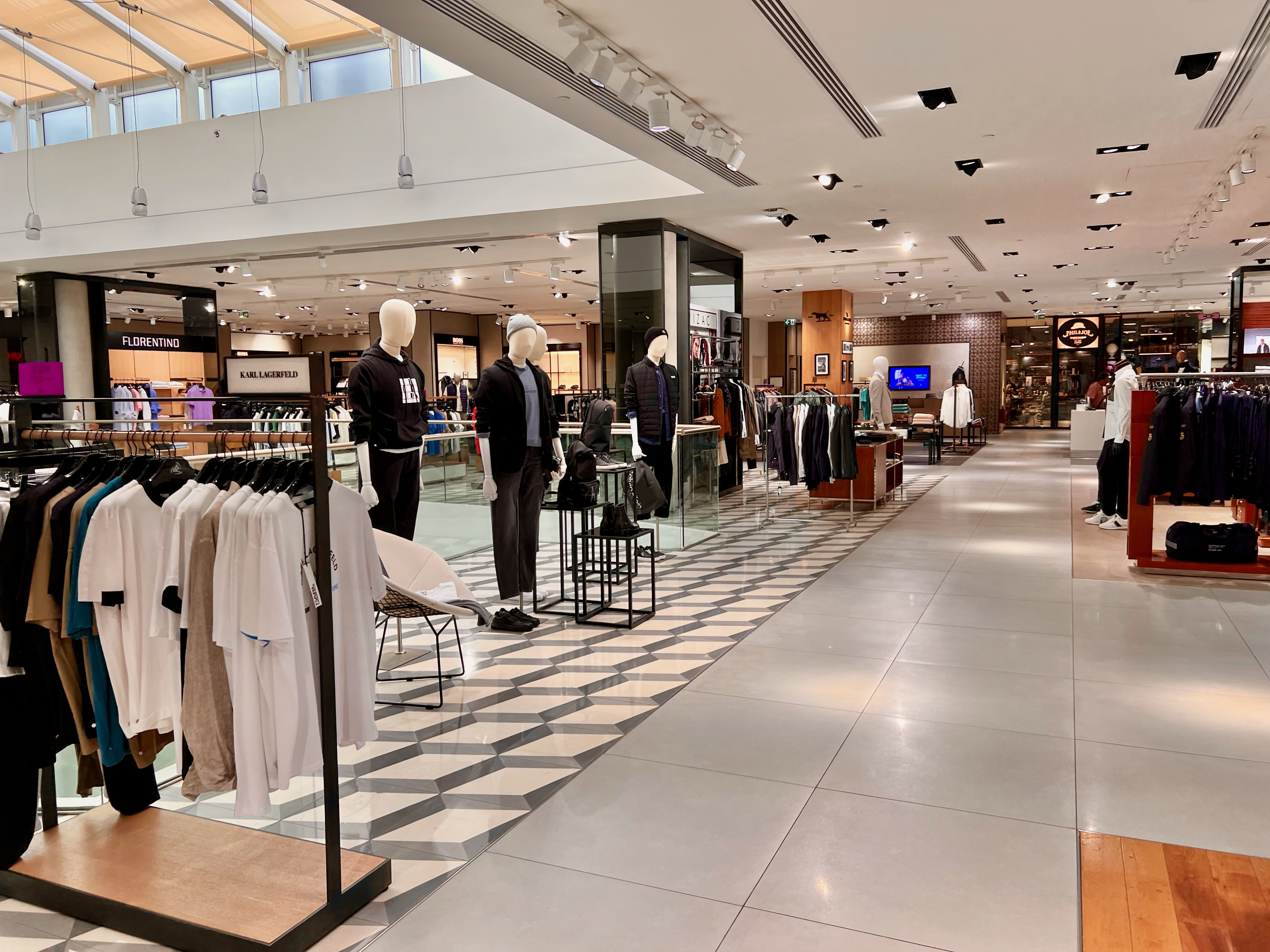
ABC Achrafieh dept. store 2022

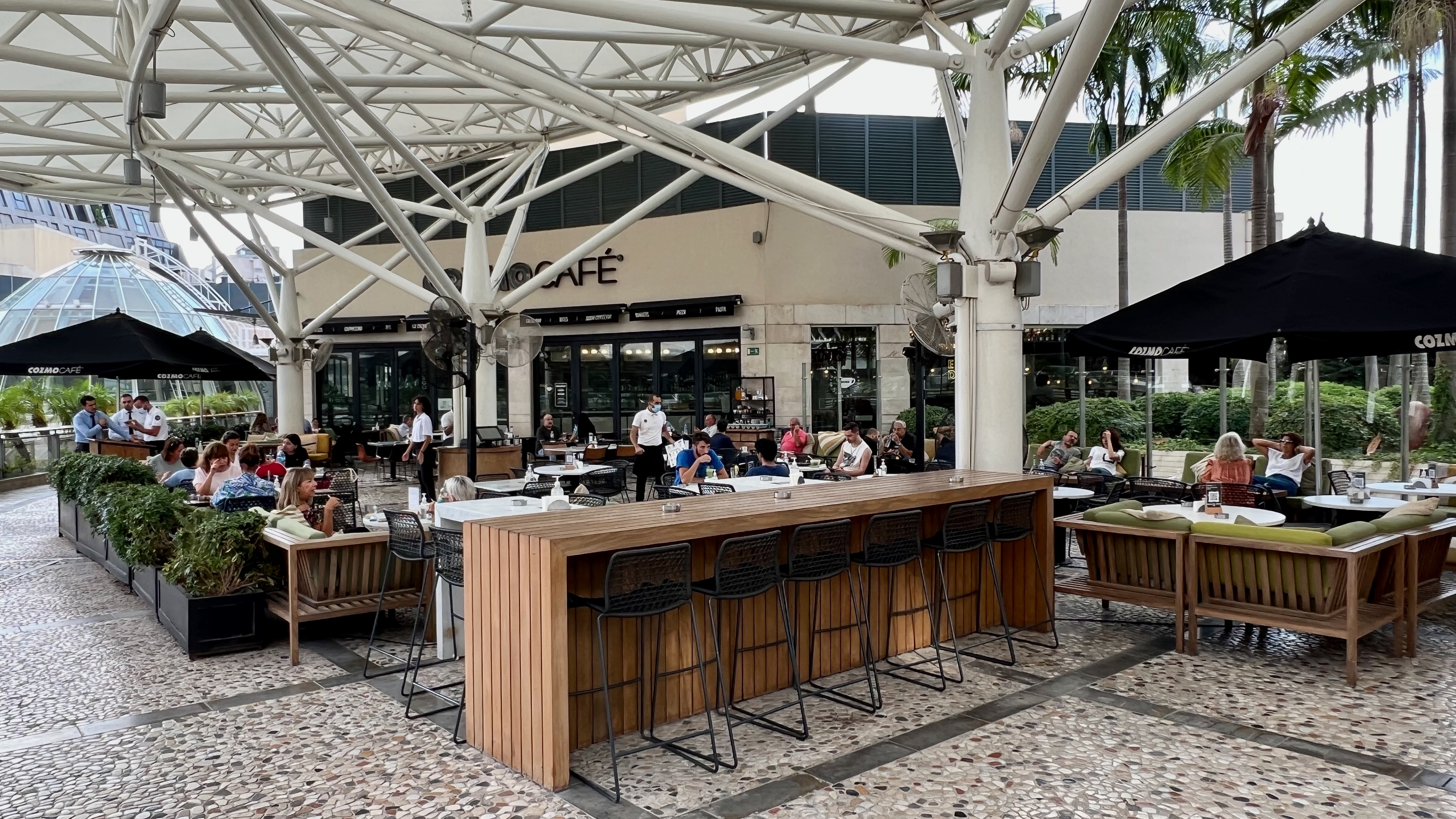
Dining, ABC Achrafieh 2022

=== Dbayeh ===
In 1979 ABC opened what it claims to be the first true modern department store in the Middle East, in Dbayeh, a city on the Mediterranean Sea between Beirut and Jounieh. It was 15,490 m^{2} (166,700 sq ft) in size. In 2009 it was expanded to a size of 44,250 m^{2} (476,300 sq ft). At that time New York firm nARCHITECTS designed, based on the company's logo, a laser cut aluminum screen enveloping the 200,000 sq ft (19,000 m^{2}) existing building, and inverse cut-outs to adorn the facades of the 250,000 sq ft (23,000 m^{2}) addition.

=== Achrafieh ===
In 2003, ABC opened its 126,500 m^{2} (1,362,000 sq ft) flagship shopping center including a 13,500 m^{2} (145,000 sq ft) ABC department store within it, the first international-standard open-air mall in Lebanon, in the upmarket central Achrafieh neighborhood.

In 2017, agency KKD completed a redesign of the department store's interior.

In November 2023 during the Gaza war, ABC Achrafieh was at the center of a controversy where it was claimed that the Palestinian keffiyeh was banned at the mall after an employee was told to remove their keffiyeh during work hours. It was also claimed that merchandise related to Palestine was removed. ABC later confirmed that the management did ask an employee to remove her keffiyeh due to the dress code for employees that bans religious and partisan symbols, but also said that customers are free to wear what they want, and said that they have no problem if one of their stores wants to sell merchandise related to Palestine.

=== Verdun ===
In 2017, ABC opened its third mall in Verdun, southern Beirut, 155,500 m^{2} (1,674,000 sq ft) in size. ABC Verdun is home to 200 shops and a 10,800 m^{2} (116,000 sq ft) ABC Department Store. It measures 150,000 m^{2} (1,600,000 sq ft) and was developed on an ex-property of the Church in a joint venture with Bahaa Hariri, the Group of one of the sons of ex-Prime Minister of Lebanon, Rafic Hariri, murdered in 2005, whose other son Saad Hariri also served as Prime Minister. ABC Group holds 40% of the capital and operates the mall.

The architectural design by Seattle-based CalissonRTKL is adapted to the climate, which avoids having to air-condition or heat the common areas: a large canopy houses the roof terrace where the restaurants and the garden are located. Below, the corridors are protected from rain but the air circulates and is refreshed naturally.

=== Other stores ===
Other former ABC stores that are now closed include ABC at Bab Idriss Square (opened 1936), ABC Bab Borj (opened 1940), ABC Hamra (opened 1948, now an outlet store), ABC Zahlé (opened 1973, now an outlet store), ABC Kaslik (opened 1978) and ABC Furn El Chebbak (opened 1994).

ABC also operates 3 outlet stores: Tripoli (Lebanon), Zahlé, and in Beirut in the Hamra district. It operates standalone boutiques in its malls for three brands: Calvin Klein, Ted Baker and Tommy Hilfiger.

In 2020 ABC launched an e-commerce site.
