= Grand Théâtre des Mille et Une Nuits =

Theatre in Beirut, Lebanon

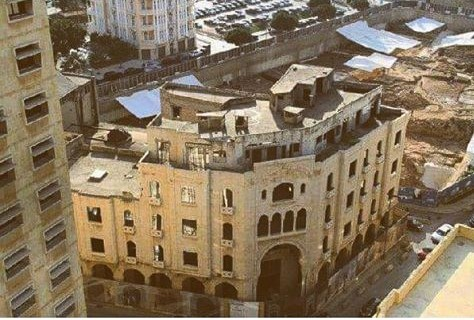
Aerial view of the Grand Theater.

The Grand Théâtre des Mille et Une Nuits (commonly known as the Grand Théâtre; Arabic: التياترو الكبير) was a theatre located in downtown Beirut, Lebanon. The structure is currently unused.

== Overview ==
It was designed by Youssef Aftimos and built in the 1920s by Jaques Tabet (a poet and theater lover). The building opened in 1929. The Grand Théâtre hosted throughout the years international performances and movie productions.

== History ==
It was part of a commercial center that housed a hotel, rental apartments, offices and shops. The construction of the Grand Théâtre on the corner of Emir Bashir and Syria streets blocked the original 1878 design of a major thoroughfare connecting the harbor to the Pine Forest at the city's southern limit. The horseshoe-shaped auditorium of the theatre accommodated 630 seats with an orchestra, two balconies, and machinery for stage sets. A small electrically-operated steel dome slid on rails, allowing the roof to open for ventilation. A domed ceiling with decorated stained glass covered the lobby.

The Grand Théâtre opened in 1929 with a French musical called No, No, Nanette, adapted from a Broadway success. The theatre later hosted the Comédie Française, the Ballet des Champs-Elysées, the Egyptian Ramses Group, and concerts by Abdel Wahab and Um Kalthoum. The Grand Théâtre also screened international movie productions and catered for major literary and charity events. From the 1960s onwards, it operated solely as a movie theater. During the Lebanese civil war the building was used for various purposes (pornographic movies projection, field hospital). It was damaged and was progressively abandoned due to the heavy fighting in the area.

After the war the Grand Théâtre fell under the control of Solidere. The facade was restored and the building partially repaired. Solidere had plans to convert the building into a boutique hotel, but as of today the Grand Théâtre remains unused.

== Timeline ==
- 1920s: the Grand Théâtre is designed by Youssef Aftimus and built by Jacques Tabet
- 1929: opening
- 1960s: the Grand Théâtre is repurposed as a movie theater
- 1975-1990: damaged by the civil war
- 1994: ownership transferred to solidere. Restoration of the facade and partial repairs.
- 2019: large numbers of Lebanese found an opportunity to rediscover the Grand Théâtre during the mass protests

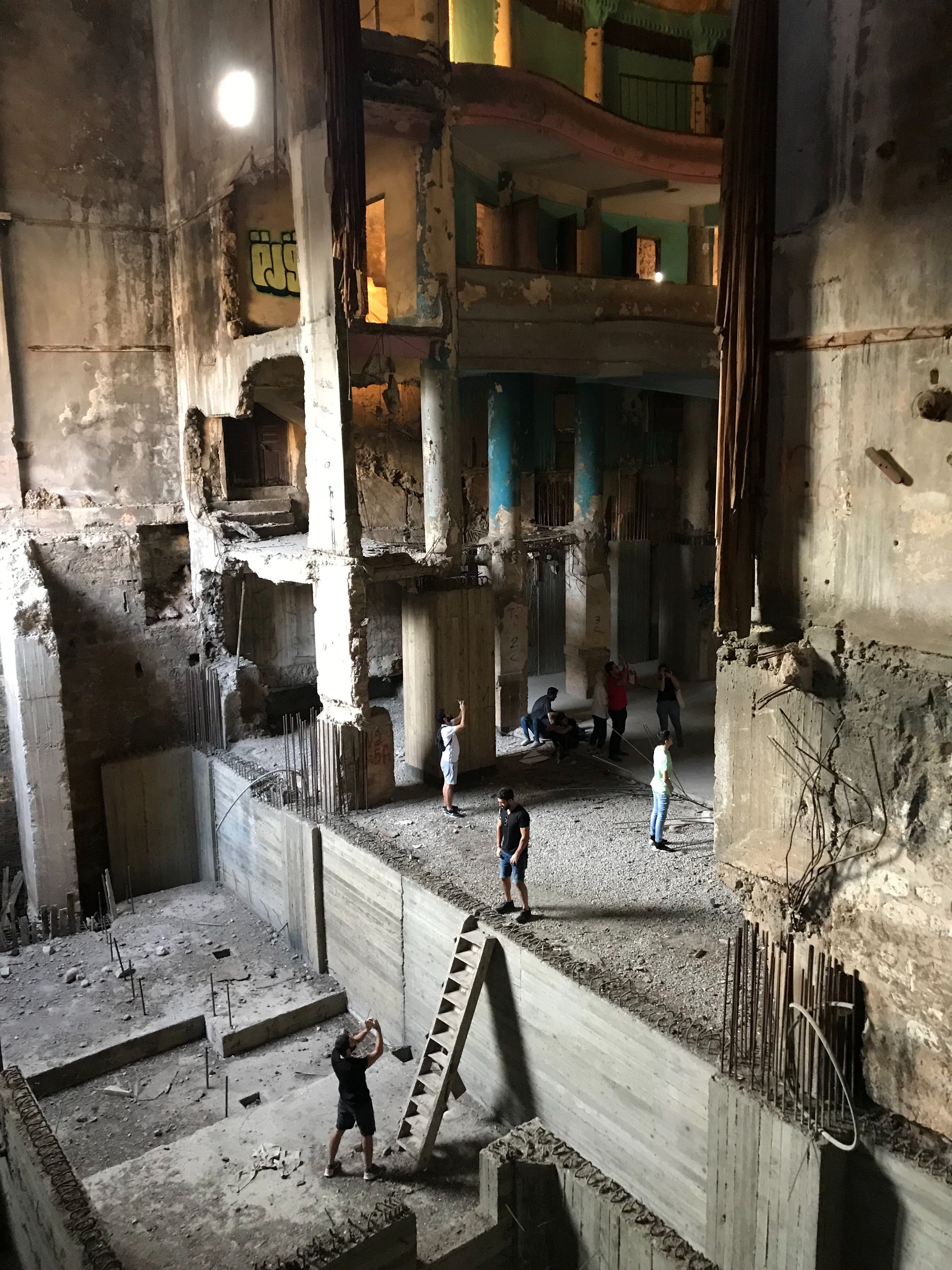
Le Grand Theatre des Mille et Une Nuits, Beyrouth, Liban

== See also ==
- Art Deco
- Beirut Central District
- Comedie Francaise
- Moorish Revival architecture
- Theatre of Lebanon
- Youssef Aftimos
