= Castle Square, Beirut =

Square in Beirut, Lebanon

Castle Square is a square in Beirut, Lebanon, named after Beirut Castle that stood nearby until demolition in the late 19th century. Remains of a western extension of the castle are preserved within the square.

== Timeline ==
- 8th century: Reinforcement of the Tell with a fortress.
- Crusader period: A 6-meter-wide moat separated the southwestern tower from the lower city, protecting the castle from attacks.
- 1827 and 1840: Heavy naval bombardments rendered the castle obsolete.
- 1890s: The fort and the castle promontory were demolished to construct a road and railway.

== See also ==
- Beirut Castle
- Martyrs' Square, Beirut
