= Bab Idriss Square =

Public space in Beirut, Lebanon

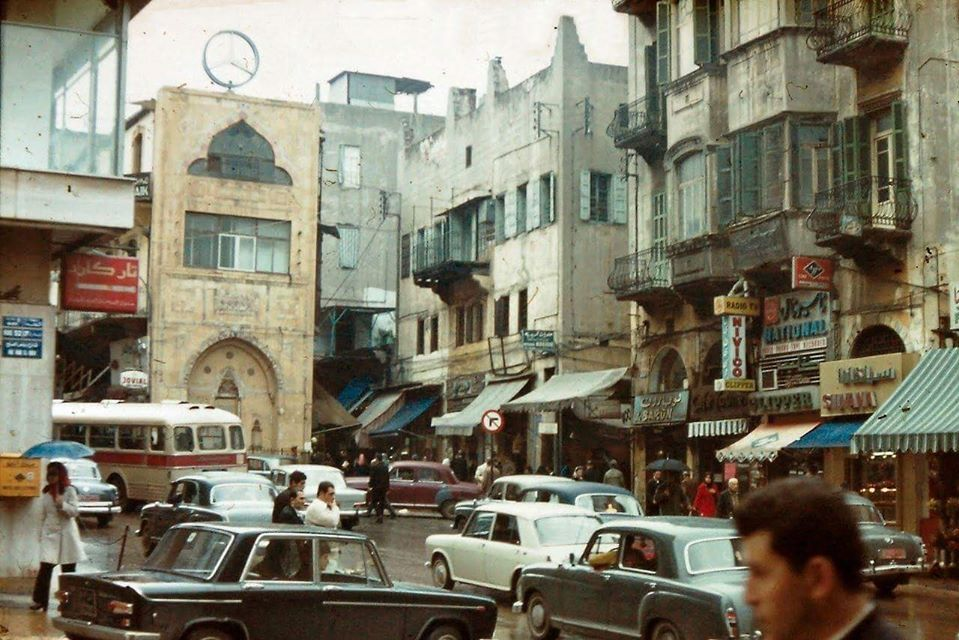
The square in 1960

Bab Idriss Square (Arabic: ساحة باب إدريس) is a square in downtown Beirut, Lebanon.

== Overview ==
Bab Idriss was one of the main entrances to Beirut's city center, and a popular destination until 1975. With the reconstruction, it was designed as a new square.

== Construction ==
Once the souks of Beirut were built at the turn of the 19th century, the role of Bab Idriss developed. It was an important transport hub and a popular destination. During the French Mandate, Abdel Hamid Karameh Street was connected to Bab Idriss. A square was planned at that location but never built. Post-war reconstruction of the mid-1990s offered the opportunity to achieve this, reinforcing Bab Idriss’s role as the western gateway to Beirut’s historic core.

== History ==
Bab refers to an ancient gate and Idriss to the family owning property at the crossroads since the 19th century. Although not always a gate, Bab Idriss remained one in popular memory, and was one of the main entrances to the city center. In Roman times, a colonnaded street was located in this area, and connected the city center of Berytus to the Hippodrome in Wadi Abu Jamil. Later, the city wall blocked this main street. With the construction of the souks of Beirut at the turn of the 19th century, the role of Bab Idriss developed. Two tramway lines made it an important transport hub and a popular destination: the 1936 ABC store, Patisserie Suisse, Café Tanios, Cosmos Restaurant and Librairie Antoine were among its memorable venues. During the French Mandate, Abdel Hamid Karameh Street - one of the streets radiating from Etoile Square – was connected to Bab Idriss. There, a square was planned but never built.

Today, Bab Idriss Square is framed by the restored Tanios and Sabbag buildings to the north, and on its southern side by the ABC and Kronfol-Daouk buildings. The latter was dismantled and reconstructed to make way for wider roads. On its eastern side, the square is dominated by the Idriss building.

== Timeline ==
Roman era: Colonnaded street connected the city center of Berytus to the Hippodrome in Wadi Abu Jamil.

19th century: Role of Bab Idriss developed after the construction of the souks of Beirut.

French Mandate: Abdel Hamid Karameh Street, radiating from Etoile Square was connected to Bab Idriss.

Mid-1990s: Post-war reconstruction offered the opportunity to build a square.

== See also ==
- Bab (disambiguation)
- Wadi Abu Jamil
