= Foch Street, Beirut =

Street in Beirut, Lebanon

Foch Street is located in Beirut, Lebanon.

== Overview ==
During the French Mandate, the street was conceived as one of two main arteries connecting the harbor district to the city center. It was named after Ferdinand Foch, the first High Commissioner of the Mandate.

== Construction ==
In 1878, plans to modernize the harbor and the city center were updated during the French Mandate, and Foch Street was conceived as one of two main arteries connecting the reconstructed harbor district to the city center. Named after Marshal Ferdinand Foch, the first High Commissioner of the French Mandate, works on Foch Street were completed by 1927. Intended to be the architectural showcase of the city, the Municipality launched in 1920 a competition for the design of future buildings on these two streets. While many buildings on Foch Street have elaborate decorative motifs borrowed from Greek, Renaissance and 18th century styles, some feature neo-classical and eclectic designs, and others display characteristics of the Lebanese vernacular tradition.

== History ==
In 1878, the Municipality of Beirut developed plans to modernize the harbor and the city center. These plans were updated during the French Mandate, and Foch Street was conceived as one of two main arteries connecting the reconstructed harbor district to the city center. The street was named after Marshal Ferdinand Foch, the first High Commissioner of the French Mandate. Work on Foch Street began in 1919 and was completed in 1927; the street connected the new harbor area to Martyrs’ Square. In 1920, the Municipality launched a competition for the design of future buildings on Foch and Allenby streets. The buildings bordering these two streets were intended to be the architectural showcase of the city. The winning scheme of French architects Deschamps and Dettray set design guidelines, encouraging the emulation of European classical styles for the façades. Although many buildings on Foch Street have elaborate decorative motifs borrowed freely from Greek, Renaissance and 18th century styles, there are some that feature neo-classical and eclectic designs, and others that display characteristics of the Lebanese vernacular tradition.

== Timeline ==
- 1878: Plans to modernize the harbor and the city center set out by the Municilpaity of Beirut.
- 1927: Completion of works on Foch Street, which started in 1919.
- 1920: Launch of the Municipality of Beirut's competition regarding the design of future buildings on Foch and Allenby Streets.

== See also ==
- Municipality of Beirut
- French Mandate
- Marshal Ferdinand Foch
- Martyrs' Square
- Foch-Allenby District
