= Beirut City Hall =

City hall in Lebanon

- مبنى بلدية بيروت
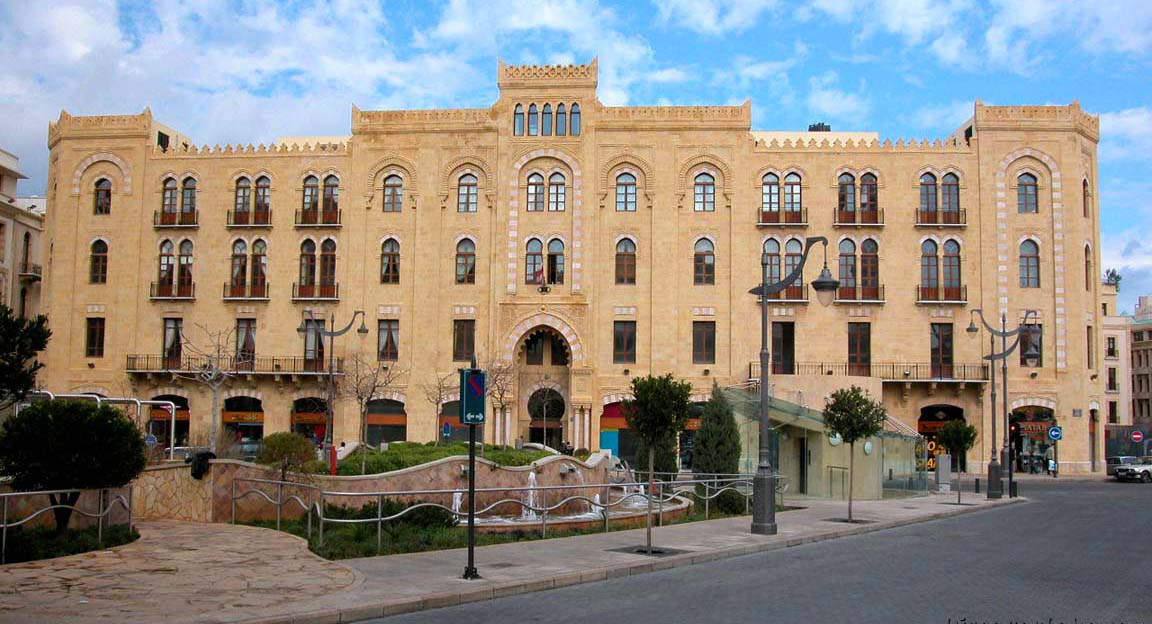
- Main frontage of the Beirut City Hall

General information
- Type: City hall
- Architectural style: Neo Mauresque
- Location: Beirut, Lebanon
- Coordinates: 33.89793°N 35.50569°E
- Completed: 1924

Design and construction
- Architect: Youssef Aftimus

Beirut City Hall, (Arabic: بلدية بيروت; also known as the Beirut Municipality Building), is the seat of the municipal government of Beirut, the capital of Lebanon. Located at the corner of Foch Street and Rue Weygand in the Beirut Central District, it was designed by Lebanese architect Youssef Aftimus and completed in the 1920s. Its architecture has been variously described as Neo-Moorish, Neo-Mamluk and Neo-Ottoman. The building was damaged during the Lebanese Civil War (1975–1990) and was subsequently restored as part of the postwar reconstruction of the Beirut Central District.

== History ==
=== Design and construction ===
Accounts of the building's origin differ somewhat in their particulars. The geographer Éric Verdeil, in his study of Beirut's twentieth-century urban planners, writes that Youssef Aftimus, by then the Municipality's chief engineer, and already responsible for several public commissions, including the clock erected in front of the Grand Serail in 1898 and the Bois des Pins palace of 1919, designed the new municipal headquarters. In an interview published by Les clés du Moyen-Orient, the urban geographer Liliane Buccianti-Barakat, a specialist on Beirut at the Université Saint-Joseph, describes the building as the outcome of an architecture competition held in 1923, which Aftimus won. The new structure would serve the growing administrative needs of Beirut during the French Mandate period.

=== Civil War and postwar reconstruction ===
Beirut's historic centre, including the Foch-Weygand quarter built up under the French Mandate, suffered heavy damage during the Lebanese Civil War (1975–1990), which left much of downtown Beirut in ruins. The City Hall was damaged by shelling and gunfire during the conflict. By the end of the war, the building had been heavily damaged.

Following the end of the civil war, the Lebanese government initiated reconstruction efforts for the downtown area, overseen by Solidere, a private development company. In 2000, Beirut City Hall underwent a comprehensive restoration project aimed at repairing the war damage while preserving its historical and architectural integrity. Buccianti-Barakat states that approximately 83 per cent of the prewar fabric of central Beirut was demolished during the postwar reconstruction, while the French Mandate-era quarter containing the City Hall was rehabilitated. The building was damaged again in the 2020 Beirut explosion; its windows were shattered, and its façade and interior were damaged.

== Architecture ==
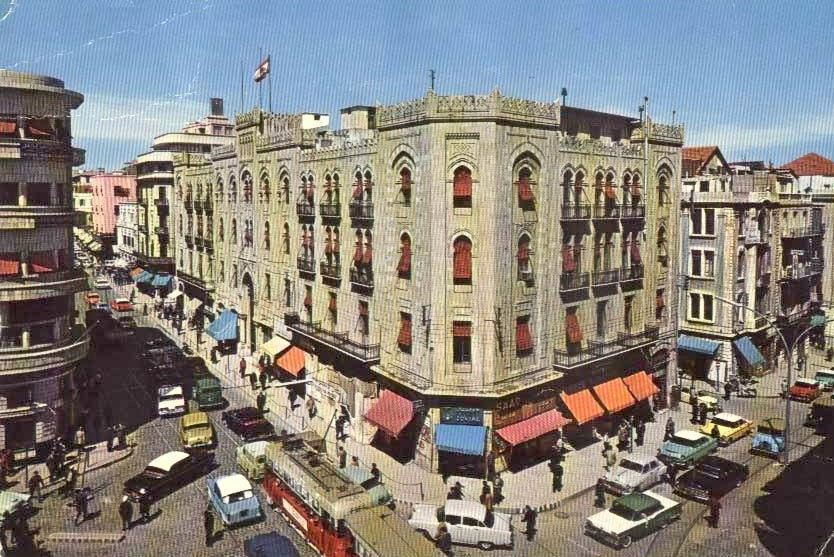
Beirut City Hall in the 1960s

The building has been variously classified as Neo-Mamluk, Neo-Moorish and Neo-Ottoman. The American University of Beirut Libraries describes it as Neo-Mamluk, while Buccianti-Barakat compares its appearance to a Moroccan ksar and notes that its ochre colour differs from that of traditional Beirut houses. Solidere describes its architecture as combining European eclecticism with Neo-Ottoman elements. The structure features prominent arches, intricate stonework, and decorative plaster and granite details, drawing on both Ottoman and French Mandate influences.

== Location ==
The building stands at the corner of Foch Street and Rue Weygand, within the conservation area that Solidere restored as part of its reconstruction of the Beirut Central District, close to the Al-Omari and Emir Assaf mosques.

== See also ==
- Martyrs' Square
- Beirut Heritage Trail
