= City Wall and Moat =

City Wall and Moat is located in Beirut, Lebanon.

== History ==
Wall and moat were built atop the Phoenician cemetery, and cut across the ruins of the Phoenico-Persian, Hellenistic and Roman residences. The wall was built around the 9th century and dismantled at the beginning of the 20th century. Souk Al-Jamil was built over the backfilled moat. In the late 19th century, the city wall and its moat lost their strategic significance.

== Moat ==
Located outside the city wall, the moat played an important defensive role in times of war.

== See also ==
- City wall
- Moat
- Souk Al-Jamil
