= Emir Munzer Mosque =

Mosque in Beirut, Lebanon

- Arabic: جامع الأمير منذر
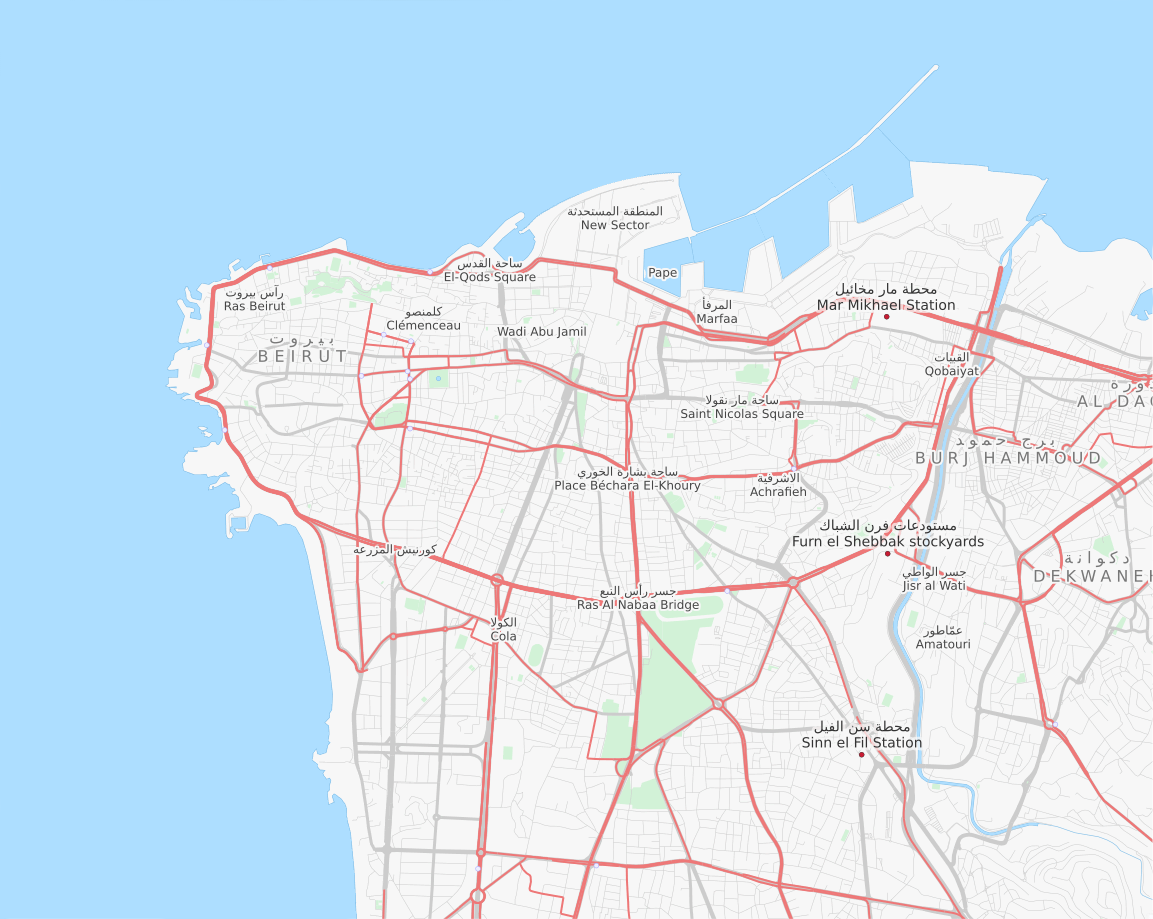
- Location of the mosque in Beirut

Religion
- Affiliation: Islam
- Ecclesiastical or organizational status: Mosque
- Status: Active

Location
- Location: Beirut central district
- Country: Lebanon
- Interactive map of Emir Munzer Mosque
- Coordinates: 33°53′52.0″N 35°30′13.5″E

Architecture
- Type: Mosque architecture
- General contractor: Emir Munzer Al-Tannoukhi
- Completed: 1620

Specifications
- Dome: One
- Minaret: One
- Materials: Granite

The Emir Munzer Mosque (Arabic: جامع الأمير منذر), also called the Amir Munzer Mosque and the Naoufara Mosque, referring to the fountain in its courtyard, is a mosque, located in the central district of Beirut, Lebanon.

The mosque was constructed in the Ottoman era, most likely in 1620, by Emir Munzer Al-Tannoukhi, who was the Governor of Beirut between 1616 and 1633. Partly damaged during the Lebanese Civil War, the mosque was restored in 2002.

== Construction and history ==
This mosque was constructed by Emir Munzer Al-Tannoukhi. The mosque was also known as Masjid Al-Naoufara. It has two entrances: the original 17th century arch portal from Souk Al-Bazarkhan, and a second entrance with three arches, added when the adjacent building was demolished to make way for the new Emir Fakhreddine Street (later renamed Riad Al-Solh Street).

Eight Roman granite columns were re-used in the construction of the mosque’s courtyard. In 1749, the Shihab dynasty brothers, Emir Melhem and Emir Mansour, restored the building. Partly damaged during the Lebanese Civil War (1975–1990), the mosque was restored in 2002.

== See also ==
- Islam in Lebanon
- List of mosques in Lebanon
- Lebanese Civil War
