= Emir Assaf Mosque =

Mosque in Beirut, Lebanon

- Arabic: جامع الأمير منصور عساف
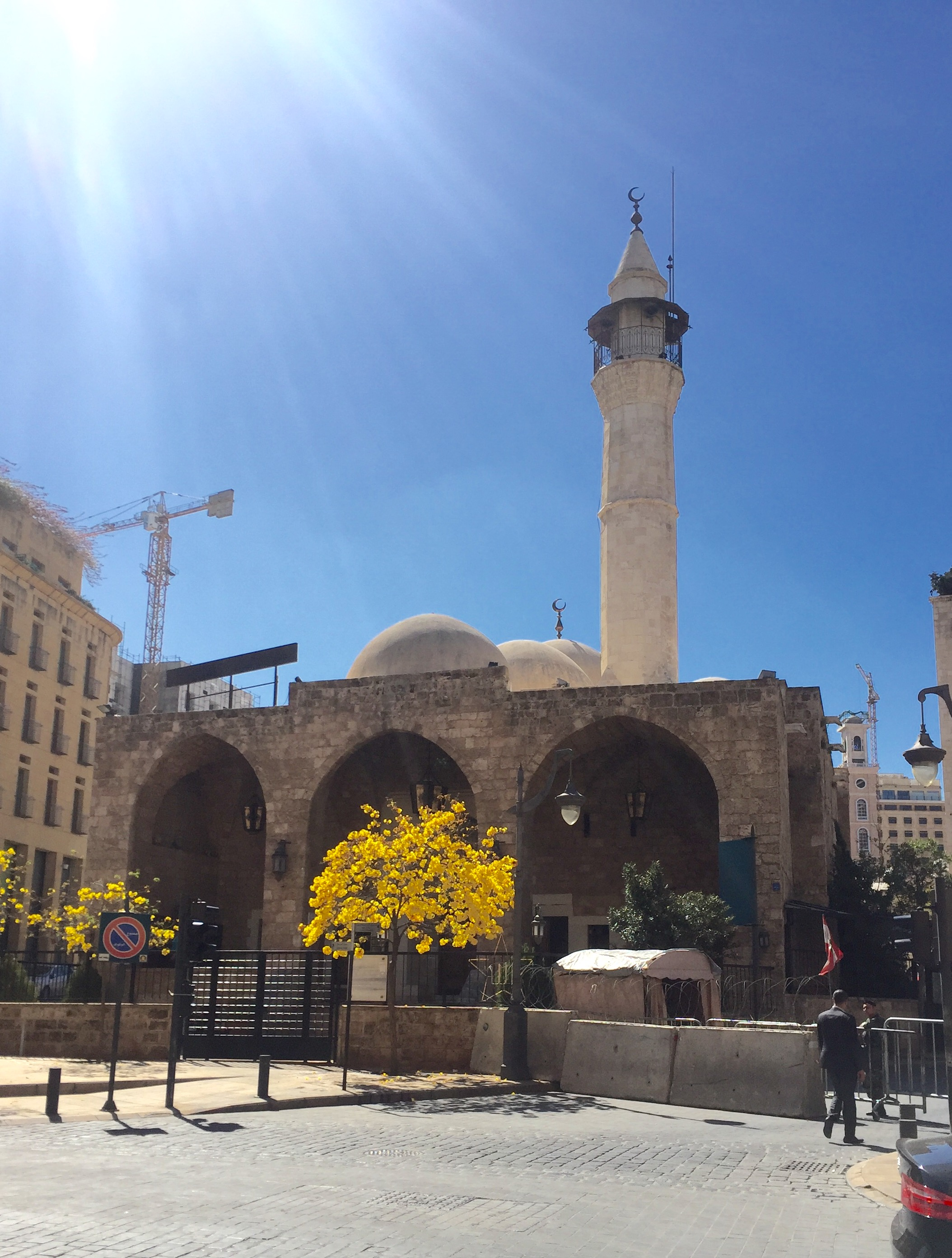
- The mosque in 2016

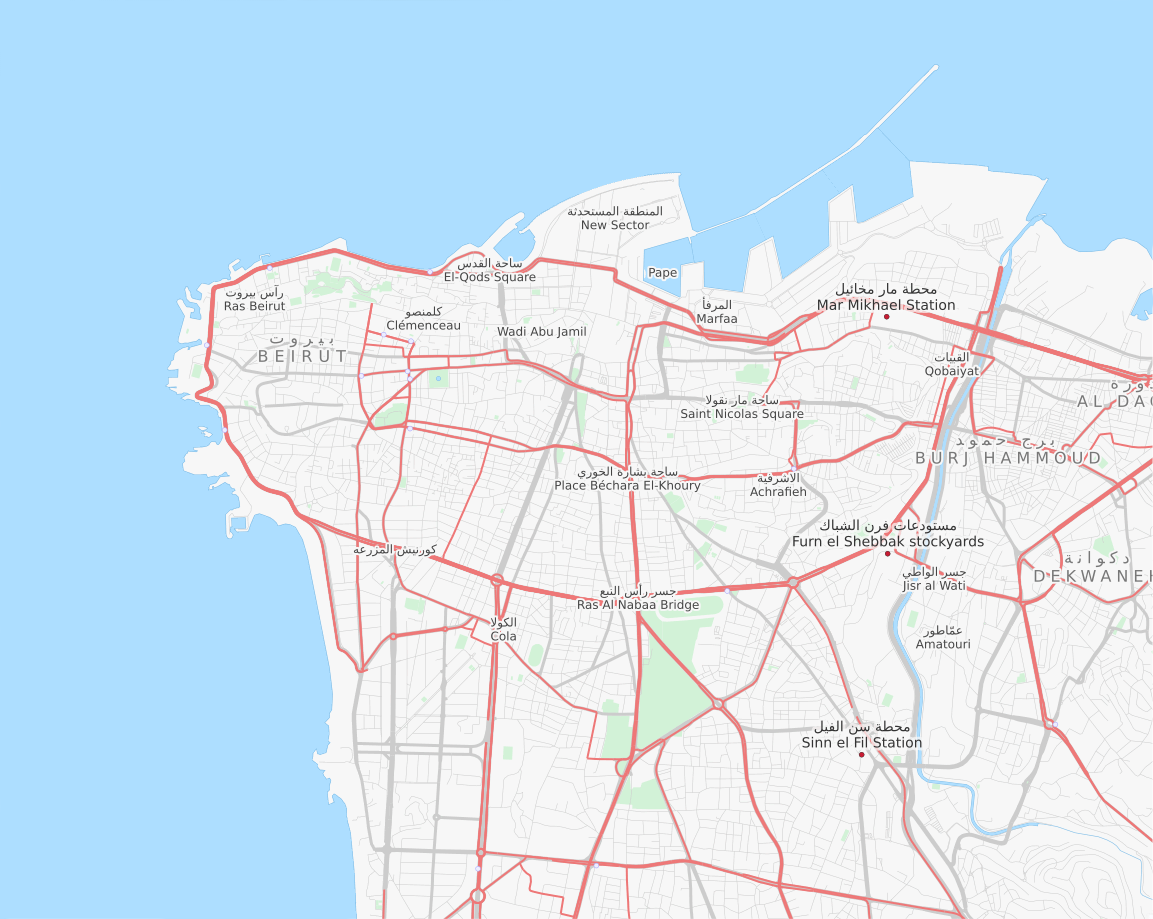
- Location of the mosque in Beirut

Religion
- Affiliation: Islam
- Ecclesiastical or organizational status: Mosque
- Status: Active

Location
- Location: Weygand Street, Beirut central district
- Country: Lebanon
- Interactive map of Emir Assaf Mosque
- Coordinates: 33°53′51″N 35°30′21″E

Architecture
- Type: Mosque architecture
- Founder: Emir Mansur Assaf
- Established: 1597

Specifications
- Dome: Five
- Minaret: One
- Materials: Stone

The Emir Assaf Mosque (Arabic: جامع الأمير منصور عساف), also called the Babe al-Saraya Mosque (lit. Door of the Great Serial), is a mosque, located on Weygand Street, in the central district of Beirut, Lebanon.

== History ==
The site chosen to build the mosque was on the site of the former Byzantine Church of the Holy Savior.

This mosque was inaugurated by Emir Mansur Assaf in 1597, on the former Serail Square. The Old Serail and the bath complex were replaced by Souk Sursock in the 1880s, while the Bab al-Saraya gate was removed in 1915 to make way for the new Foch-Allenby commercial district. In 1934, the mosque’s ablution rooms were built on the west side, in alignment with the street leading to Nejmeh Square. Post-war restoration of the mid-1990s lead to the renovation of the original western façade of the mosque.

== Architecture ==
The square shape of the mosque, its five-cupola roof, the ablaq decoration of the entrance and the muqarnas detailing of the windows are characteristic of Lebanese style.

== See also ==
- Islam in Lebanon
- List of mosques in Lebanon
- Foch-Allenby District
