= Zawiyat Ibn Arraq =

Old building in Beirut

Zawiyat Ibn Arraq is located in downtown Beirut, Lebanon.

== Overview ==
Beirut’s only remaining Mamluk building, built in 1517 by the religious authority Mohammad Ibn Arraq Al-Dimashqi. Initially a hospice, it remained a private madrasa (college of jurisprudence) and a zawiya until late Ottoman times.

== Construction ==
A small domed building is all that remains today of the late Mamluk zawiya (prayer corner) of Ibn ‘Arraq Al-Dimashqi. In 1517, Ibn ‘Arraq built a house and a ribat (hospice) in Beirut. It is recorded that he chose this location to be near the former house of Imam ‘Abd al-Rahman al-Ouzai’i (8th century). The arches of the standing building once opened to other rooms and courtyards.

== History ==
A small domed building is all that remains today of the late Mamluk zawiya (prayer corner) of Ibn ‘Arraq Al-Dimashqi. Born in Damascus, Ibn ‘Arraq was a religious authority. In 1517, he built a house and a ribat (hospice) in Beirut. It is recorded that he chose this location to be near the former house of Imam ‘Abd Al-Rahman al-Ouzai’i (8th century), whose reputation for holiness and justice spread throughout the Muslim world. Ibn ‘Arraq died in Mecca in 1526. His house remained a private madrasa (college of jurisprudence) and a zawiya for his followers. The arches of the standing building once opened to other rooms and courtyards. To safeguard its conservation, a steel brace protected the structure during construction.

== Timeline ==
1517: Ibn " Arraq Al-Dimashqi" built a house and a ribat in Beirut.

1526: Ibn ‘Arraq died in Mecca.

== See also ==
- Mamluk
- Zawiya (institution)
