= Souk al-Tawileh =

Souk al-Tawileh is a street located in the heart of downtown Beirut, Lebanon.

== Overview ==
Dating back to the Phoenico-Persian period, this street flourished as a prosperous commercial venue until the outbreak of the Civil War in 1975.

== Construction ==
Souk al-Tawileh (‘al-Tawileh’ meaning long in Arabic) is the central north-south street of the Souks district; it once led all the way to the harbor. 1994 excavations in Beirut revealed that the street’s origins dated back to the Phoenico-Persian period. In 1874, the Ottoman urbanization plan of Beirut turned Souk al-Tawileh into a commercial street. It flourished until 1975 as a prosperous shopping venue.

== History ==
Souk al-Tawileh (‘al-Tawileh’ meaning long in Arabic) is the central north-south street of Beirut Souks; it once led all the way to the harbor. During the post-war reconstruction of Beirut’s central district that began in 1994, excavations through successive layers revealed that the street’s origins dated back to the Phoenico-Persian period. Souk al-Tawileh thrived in Romano-Byzantine times; it lost its standing after the 551 Beirut earthquake, remaining a simple earth path for a long time. In 1874, the Ottoman urbanization plan of Beirut turned Souk al-Tawileh into a commercial street. It flourished until 1975 as a prosperous shopping venue.

Its shops often bore French names, and sold clothing, perfumes and other luxury articles. A shop owner whose family had a store in Souk al-Tawileh remembers: "This large store was one of the oldest and most attractive stores of the city center. It had a surface area of 800 square meters. People came from all over Lebanon and Syria to admire it and buy silver, crystal and porcelain articles, fabrics, hats, gloves, toys…"

== Timeline ==
Phoenico-Persian Period: Origin of Souk al-Tawileh street.

551 A.D: Earthquake destroyed street and turned it into a simple earth path.

1874: Ottoman urbanization plan of Beirut turned Souk al-Tawileh into a commercial street.

1975: Souk thrived as a prosperous shopping venue until outbreak of the Civil War.

1994: beginning of the post war reconstruction of Beirut’s central district restituted the street's importance.
