= Solidere =

Lebanese company for redevelopment of Beirut Central District

Solidere s.a.l.
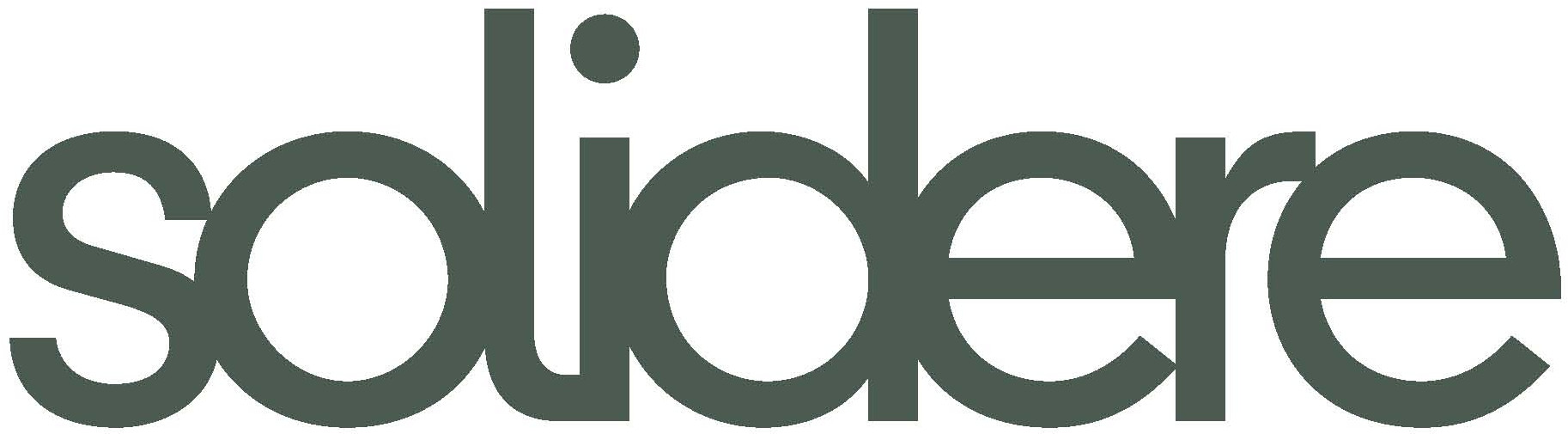
- Type: Joint-Stock Company
- Industry: Real estate
- Founded: 1994; 32 years ago
- Founders: Council of Development and Reconstruction (CDR)
- Headquarters: Beirut, Lebanon
- Area served: Beirut Central District
- Key people: Nasser Chammaa (Chairman)
- Website: solidere.com

Solidere s.a.l. is a Lebanese joint-stock company in charge of planning and redeveloping Beirut Central District following the conclusion, in 1990, of the Lebanese Civil War. By agreement with the government, Solidere has special powers of eminent domain as well as limited regulatory authority codified in law, making the company a form of public-private partnership.

Solidere was founded on 5 May 1994 under the authority of the Council of Development and Reconstruction and following the vision of then-Prime Minister Rafik Hariri. Solidere was incorporated as a privately owned company listed on the stock exchange. The name stands for Société Libanaise pour le Développement et la Reconstruction du Centre-ville de Beyrouth, French for "The Lebanese Company for the Development and Reconstruction of Beirut Central District".

Solidere's original mandate was to finish its development work and dissolve by 2019, but this date has been extended to 2029.

== Projects ==
Solidere is widely credited as the most important force behind Beirut's reemergence, in recent years, as a bustling urban destination with a chance to earn back its prewar title of "Paris of the Middle East". Solidere's main functions are the supervision of the government-authorized reconstruction plan, financing and developing the infrastructure, new construction and rehabilitation of war-torn structures, urban landscaping and the management of property. Solidere has worked to attract global retailers such as Virgin Megastores to Beirut Central District. Its most significant single project to date has been Beirut Souks, a 100,000 m^{2} retail center that was scheduled to open by 2008. It opened in 2009. Other projects that are central to the company's cultural strategy for the center are the Beirut Exhibition Center, add Saifi Village - Quartier des Arts, a residential neighbourhood with a high density of design shops and art galleries.

== Controversy and challenges ==
Solidere was founded after the government chose the framework of the Real Estate Holding Company (REHCO) as the most viable option to reconstruct the central district, which was severely damaged and demolished, and emptied of its pre-war economic and demographic activity. Some research points out that the REHCO solution was the only viable option. The practical nonexistence of a functional government after the war, and the near-impossibility to align all stakeholders, including property owners, into one unified and feasible vision, called for private resources to plan and execute a project of such scale and importance. Hariri's credibility as a business person and the speed and efficiency of submitting plans and investments models all played in favor of the REHCO model. It can be argued that without this large-scale intervention, the centre would have at best re-developed in a chaotic and uncoordinated manner, the way that other areas of the capital are experiencing.

Solidere was given powers of compulsory purchase, compensating in Solidere shares rather than cash, and of a regulatory authority allowing it to manage the city centre area. Critics claim the company used harassment to drive the original residents out for compensation below true market value.

The first axis of controversy relates to the mechanisms and masterplans of the reconstruction. Several opposition groups emerged to challenge the REHCO model and propose alternatives to it. Among those was a group of academics and urban planners who fueled a public debate about the goals and methods of reconstruction, especially the large-scale demolition and redesign, as outlined by an initial plan submitted by Dar Al Handassah. Other critical views saw the plan as disconnecting the centre from the rest of the city's fabric and transforming it into an "island of modernity". The contested plan was consequently changed, with the participation of some of the architects from the opposition groups to take into account some of the key points raised.

A modified plan emerged and was evaluated by the Engineer's Union, but it never approved by the public before being sent to government.

The second axis of controversy relates to the mechanism of property expropriation, deemed forced and enabled by Capital's pressure on the government and Hariri's influence as prime minister and the valuation of property, deemed inappropriately low. By law, the company had six months to secure the necessary cash subscriptions to balance out the land value. Were it not for that conservative valuation of land, the whole project would have collapsed when the government had no alternatives.

== Finances ==
Solidere shares went on sale at the beginning of November 1993. Each share cost $100. Sales were restricted to Arab investors. Sixty-five million shares were on sale. $1.1 billion worth of shares had already been issued to landowners, tenants and leaseholders in compulsory purchases. One property owner involved described the process as “one of the greatest swindles of the century.”

In 1996, following the Israeli seventeen day bombardment of Lebanon, Solidere revised it's $30 billion plan, Horizon 2000. The new plan projected an expenditure of $1 billion a year for five years. In the four years since Rafic Hariri becoming prime minister the country's public debt had risen from $2 billion to $8 billion. The Israeli attack was estimated to have caused damage costing $500 million. It also resulted in a loss in investor confidence.

Its shares are listed on the Beirut Stock Exchange, and its Global Depository Receipt trade on the London Stock Exchange. Its share price on the Beirut exchange has risen sharply in recent years, from about US$5 in early 2004 to a high of $39 in September 2008. Between 1995 and 2015, Solidere has approved more than $1B in dividends to its shareholders.

Solidere's 36,000 shareholders are mostly Lebanese, in addition to Arab nationals, banks, and Arab or international funds. There are two categories of shares: A held by previous property owners and B by new investors. Rafik Hariri's share in the company has been a controversial subject in the Lebanese political spectrum. Some rumors say that he owned a majority stake in Solidere before his assassination in 2005, and the Hariri family continues to be a principal shareholder today. However, the Hariri family rejected those rumors, saying that he owned only 6% of the company's shares. Furthermore, Solidere prohibits any shareholder from acquiring more than 10% of the company's capital, either directly or indirectly.

In 2020, according to Jean Hanna, Deputy General Manager at Fidus, when Solidere saw the surge in demand for real estate it stopped selling at discounts of 30 to 40 percent as it used to do in the past when there was a slump in demand. It began to sell at a fair price but afterwards it increased prices by around 30 percent with the continuous rise in demand, he said. Now that it has settled its debt, Solidere is less interested in selling properties that is why it has raised its prices, according to Hanna. The fact that real estate sales on the local market at large were only limited property owners who wanted to settle debt to banks has also contributed to the increase in demand for Solidere's properties, he said.

Solidere is back on the profit path and this trend will continue. Solidere has posted a net profit of $49 million in 2019, according to the company's released audited financial statement. Total revenues jumped from $66.2 million in 2018 to $295.4 million in 2019. Revenues from land sales, which represented 79 percent of total revenues, soared from nearly $1.3 million to $234.5 million. Hanna said that land sales allowed the company to repay its loans which reduced its interest costs and therefore the net profit resulted not only from the increase in sales revenues but also from the decrease in interest expenses. The company has decreased its total liabilities, including bank loans, by 40 percent. Total liabilities dropped to $417.4 million at the end of 2019. Solidere's interest expenses fell by $13.7 million compared with 2018. The company had said that it had succeeded in further lowering its liabilities in 2020 to $225 million at the end of June, thanks to the increase in sales. It settled debts to banks worth $190 million. “Proceeds collected from sales will reach $342 million in the first half of 2020,” it said.

Also, according to Faysal Barbir, Director-Capital Markets at FFA Private Bank, Solidere has been selling properties since the beginning of 2020 at a higher pace which would reflect on its earnings for the current year. This led to a jump in the share price. The price of Solidere ‘A’ share doubled compared with its closing price in October 2019. The trading volume of Solidere ‘A’ soared more than six times to around 900,000 shares in May from less than 150,000 shares in October 2019. The increase in share price was also driven by the fact that a new category of investors have entered the market. These are mainly depositors who wanted to preserve the value of their savings when the currency was collapsing. Solidere shares were the only option available on the stock market, especially following press reports about possible haircuts and restructuring of the banking sector. Buying real estate shares is more convenient for investors who cannot afford to buy real estate properties. Barbir also indicated that Solidere shares could rise further if a new catalyst emerges such as renewed fears regarding the banking sector or if Solidere announces an improvement in its net profit.

At the end of 2020, the rise in sales allowed the company to settle its entire debt to banks totaling more than $200 million. This has also led to a surge in its cash liquidity in banks. Solidere stocks have soared even higher sitting at $24.5 on 18 March 2021. This is a rise of 500% since November 2019.

== See also ==
- Avenue des Français
- Beirut Central District
- Beirut Heritage Trail
