= Foch-Allenby District =

Foch-Allenby District is in the heart of Beirut District, Lebanon.

== Overview ==
In Ottoman times, the Foch-Allenby District was the harbor district of Beirut. Its clearance and reconstruction was completed during the French Mandate. After the Lebanese Civil War, conservation efforts restored many of its surviving buildings within a pedestrian setting.

== Construction ==
The Foch-Allenby district is the former harbor district of Beirut, accommodating port-related activities. The two main north–south avenues, named Foch and Allenby in 1919, served as gateways to the city for visitors arriving by sea. Along with Weygand street, they formed the new business district of Beirut. The Foch-Allenby district was planned as the architectural showcase of the city. The influence of classical Haussmanian architecture was evident in most district buildings.Architectural expression had also moved towards a more regional identity which featured arched forms and eclectic regional detailing in the stonework. Post-war conservation efforts that began in 1994 restored many surviving buildings in the Foch-Allenby district within a pedestrian setting. Extended to the sea, Foch and Allenby Streets are the origin of the orthogonal grid of Beirut's new waterfront district.

== History ==
The Foch-Allenby district is the former harbor district of Beirut. Known as ‘the lower town,’ it accommodated port-related activities. During World War I, the Ottoman plan to link the city center to the waterfront required the demolition of this part of the city. The clearance and reconstruction of the harbor district was completed during the French Mandate. Named Foch and Allenby in 1919, the two main north–south avenues were perceived as gateways to the city for visitors arriving by sea. With Weygand Street, they defined the boundaries of the new business district. In the 1920s, the Foch-Allenby district was planned as the architectural showcase of the city. The majority of buildings show the influence of classical Haussmanian architecture, characterized by elaborate ornamentation borrowed from Greek, Renaissance and 18th century styles. Wrought iron and ceramic roof tiles were imported from France; mechanically sawn timber from Romania, cast iron balustrades came from Great Britain, and Italy provided marble balcony slabs. In the 1930s, the use of reinforced concrete, cast in moulds, allowed builders to emulate complex stonework detail. Architectural expression moved towards a more regional identity featuring arched forms and eclectic regional detailing in the stonework. Examples of this in the business district include the two Municipality offices and several buildings in Allenby, Moutrane, Abdul Malak and Saad Zaghloul streets. Post-war conservation efforts that began in 1994 restored many surviving buildings in the Foch-Allenby district within a pedestrian setting. Extended to the sea, Foch and Allenby Streets are the origin of the orthogonal grid of Beirut's new waterfront district.

== Timeline ==
French Mandate: Completion of the Harbor district.

1919: Named Foch and Allenby, the two main north–south avenues were gateways to the city for visitors arriving by sea.

1920s: Foch-Allenby district was planned as the architectural showcase of the city.

1930s: Architectural expression moved towards a more regional identity featuring arched forms and eclectic regional detailing in the stonework.

1994: restoration of many surviving buildings in the Foch-Allenby district within a pedestrian setting.

== See also ==
- Marshal Ferdinand Foch
- Edmund Allenby, 1st Viscount Allenby
- Banque de Syrie et du Liban
