= May Davie =

May Davie may refer to:

- Eugenie Mary Ladenburg Davie (1895 – 1975), American activist
- May Fatté Davie, Lebanese historian and scholar
