= Virgin Megastores =

British entertainment retail chain

Coordinates: 31.75298°N 8.17177°W

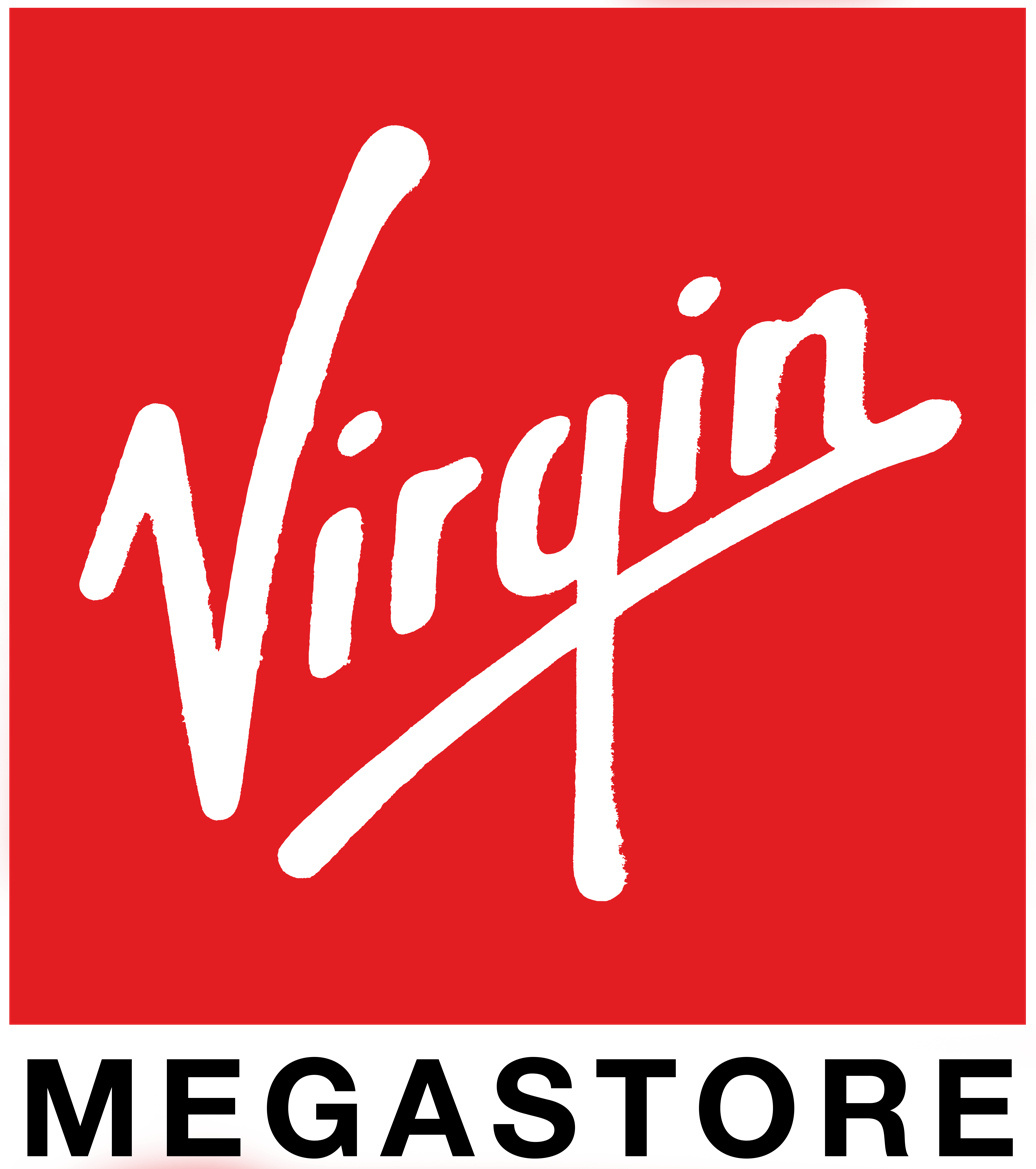
- Type: Private
- Industry: Retail
- Founded: 1976; 50 years ago on Oxford Street in London, England
- Founder: (Sir) Richard Branson
- Headquarters: London, England
- Number of locations: Various
- Areas served: North Africa, Western Asia
- Products: Books; Consoles; DVDs; Video games Magazines; Music; T-Shirts; Tickets
- Parent: Virgin Group
- Website: Virgin Megastores International portal

Virgin Megastores is a British-based international entertainment retailing chain, founded in early 1976 by Richard Branson as a record shop on London's Oxford Street.

In 1979 the company opened their first Megastore at the end of Oxford Street and Tottenham Court Road. The company expanded to hundreds of stores worldwide in the 1990s, but lost a large number of stores during the 2010s, largely with the sale and eventual closing of the European, North American, Australian, Japanese and Chinese stores. In 2007, it closed all UK stores. By 2015, it operated only in the Middle East and in North Africa.

== History ==
=== Branson's early business ventures ===
Richard Branson and Nik Powell had initially run a small record shop called Virgin Records and Tapes on Notting Hill Gate, London, specialising particularly in "krautrock" imports, and offering bean bags and free vegetarian food for the benefit of customers listening to the music on offer. After making the shop into a success, they turned their business into a fully fledged record label, Virgin Records. The name Virgin, according to Branson (in his autobiography), arose from a colleague of his when they were brainstorming business ideas. She suggested Virgin, as they were all new to business, like "virgins". The first release on the label was the progressive rock album Tubular Bells by multi-instrumentalist Mike Oldfield in 1973.

=== Virgin Megastores ===
Virgin's first formal store opened on London's Oxford Street in January or February 1971 (exact date uncertain). In 1979 the company opened their first Megastore at the end of Oxford Street and Marble Arch. Virgin Megastores and Virgin Records operated as entirely separate entities, like many of the other Virgin companies. Throughout the 1980s and 1990s Virgin Megastores opened over 100 stores in the UK, and many others around the world, including expansion into Asia Pacific and North America, under the leadership of Ian Duffell – President & CEO of Virgin Entertainment Group until 1998. Simon Wright – Chief Executive of the Virgin Entertainment Group from 1999 to 2009 was instrumental in the growth of the stores in particular developing the stores in the Middle East before their eventual disposals under license detailed under Ownership.

==== Ownership ====
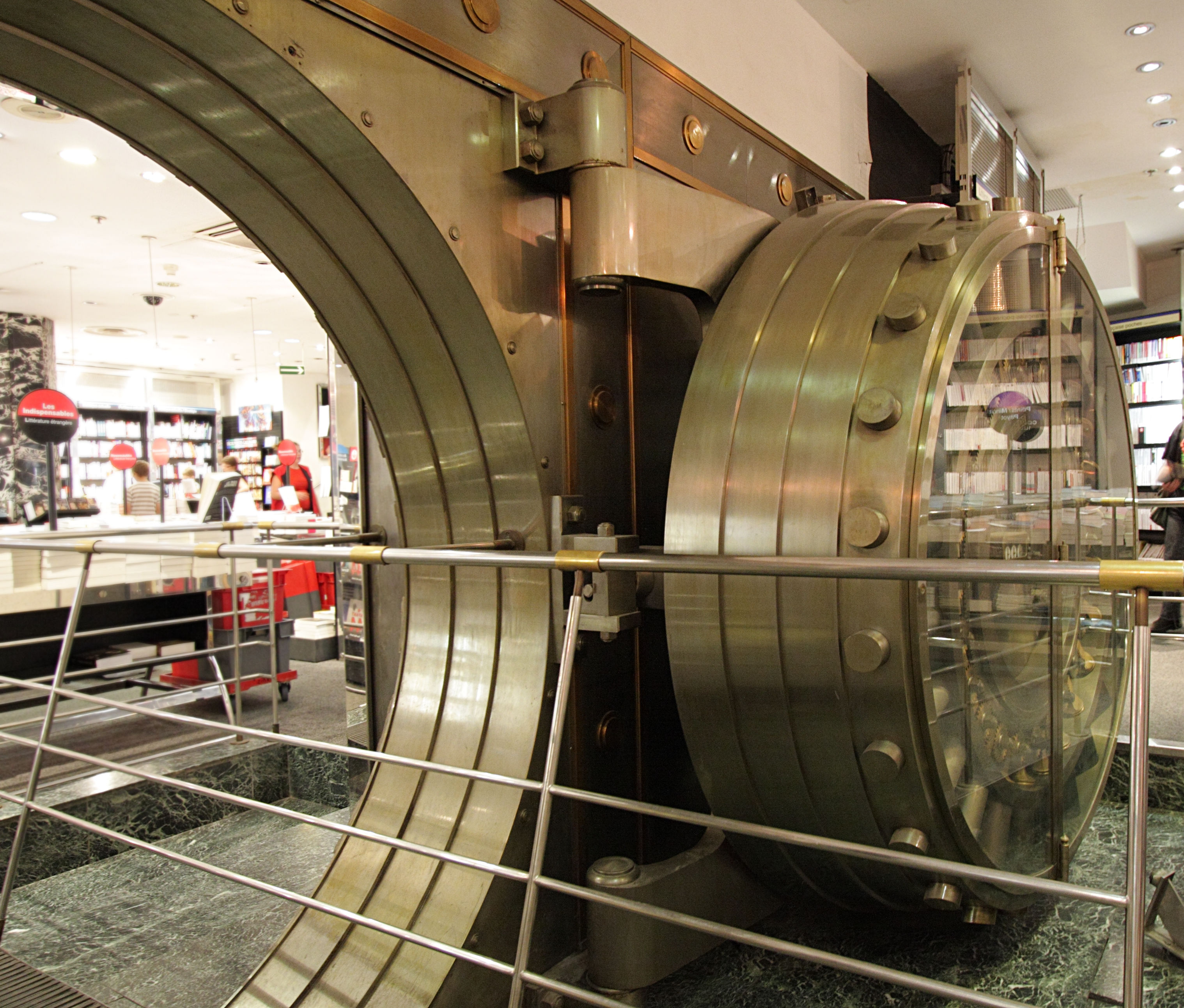
Virgin Megastore bank vault on Champs Elysées, Paris (2009)

Like many of Branson's Virgin brands, Virgin Megastores is not wholly owned by the Virgin Group. During the early to mid-2000s Virgin Group decided to sell off most of its Virgin Megastores to various companies, including the Lagardere Group. By 2001 the Virgin Megastores worldwide were split between the Virgin Group and the Lagardère Group. The Virgin Group kept the United Kingdom, Ireland, United States and Japan outlets while the Lagardère Group obtained the shops in France and travel retail locations globally including Australia, China, United Arab Emirates, Qatar, Greece, Italy, Egypt, Lebanon and Jordan.

Virgin Megastores in the Middle East currently trades as V Star Multimedia LLC. Culture Convenience Club owns what was Virgin Megastores Japan, which have since been rebranded as Tsutaya. The Australian Virgin Megastores and Virgin at Myer concept stores were operated by Brazin Limited. (Sanity Entertainment after 2009) until all were closed in 2010; Brazin also ran local HMV outlets, in addition to their own Sanity brand. In December 2007 Butler Capital Partners announced their intention to mount a majority takeover of the French arm of Virgin from Lagardère. This deal was finalised in February 2008.

In 2007 the real estate company Related Companies and Vornado Realty Trust acquired Virgin Megastores North America. Related and Vornado were the landlords for the two most profitable stores in the United States and those stores were profitable because they had long-term leases in which rents were locked in at an extremely low rate. Both real estate companies wanted to break the leases and replace Virgin with new tenants that were willing to pay the then current higher rental rates that would make an entertainment retail business unprofitable. They have since decided to close all the American stores.

Territory	Megastore owner/operator	Megastores	Books and Music	Number of Megastores
UK and Ireland	Zavvi Entertainment Group (2007–2008)	X mark	X mark	125, all closed
France	Butler Capital Partners (80%) / LS Travel Retail (15%) / Virgin Mobile France (5%)	X mark	X mark	35, all closed
La Réunion, France	SA Mediastore (100%) under Virgin Group Licence	X mark	X mark	1, all closed (licence broke in 2010)
Australia	Brazin Limited/Sanity Entertainment (2001–2010); HDS Retail Asia Pacific/LS Travel Retail (2004–2012)	X mark	X mark	24, all closed
USA	Virgin Entertainment Group (Related Companies / Vornado Realty Trust)	X mark	X mark	23, all closed (2 Virgin Books and Music stores)
Japan	Marui Co/Culture Convenience Club/Tsutaya Stores Holdings (1990–2009)	X mark	X mark	22, all closed
Greece	Vivere Entertainment	X mark	X mark	15 in 2005 – all closed
Hungary	Fotex Records	X mark	X mark	1 in 2000 – all closed
Italy		X mark	X mark	4, all closed
Spain	Virgin Retail Europe/ Virgin Retail España	X mark	X mark	9, all closed
Germany	HDS Retail/LS Travel Retail	X mark	X mark	All closed (5 Virgin Stores)
The Netherlands	Free Record Shop group	X mark	X mark	4, all closed
Canada	Virgin Entertainment Group	X mark	X mark	All closed (1 Virgin Books and Music store)
Middle East (UAE, Qatar, Bahrain, Egypt, Jordan, Oman, Kuwait)	Virgin Megastores Middle East (Azadea Group)	check	X mark	13 in UAE (2025); 4 in Qatar (2015); 3 in Egypt (2015); 2 in Jordan (2015); 2 in Bahrain (2025); 1 in Oman (2015); 1 in Kuwait (2020)
Lebanon, Saudi Arabia	Megastores of Lebanon S.A.L.	check	X mark	6 in Lebanon (2015); 10 in Saudi Arabia (2025)
Morocco	Best Financière (Label Vie Carrefour)	check	X mark	5 (2015)

== Store experience ==
=== Product range ===
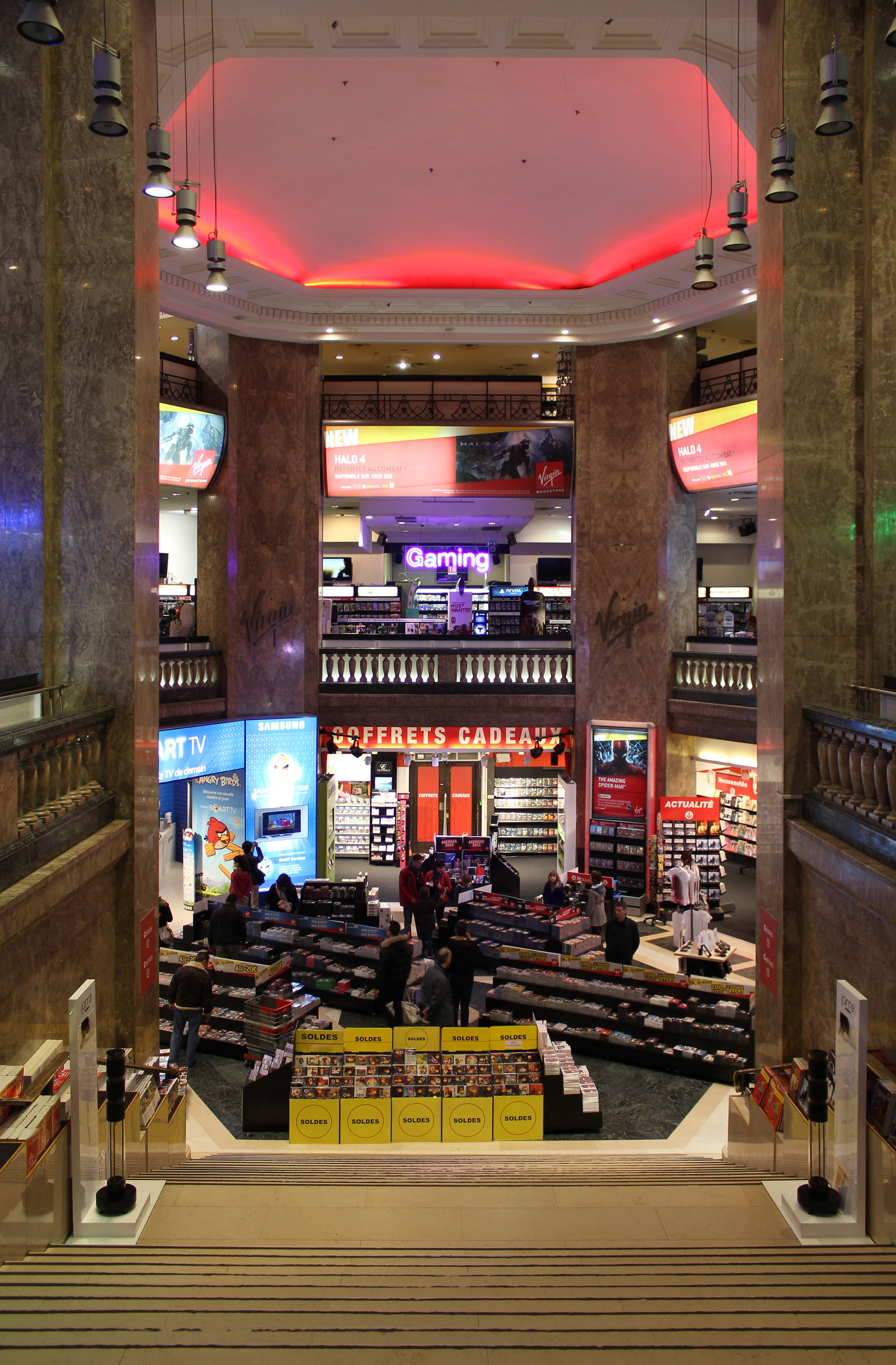
Main hall of Virgin Megastore Paris (2012)

Virgin shops have a wide selection of CDs, games, books, DVDs, vinyl records, magazines, portable media players, accessories and additional products such as calendars, board games and Virgin branded items. Larger stores also stock electronic equipment and computer peripherals. Not all of these product categories are stocked by all Virgin shops, though the larger stores do generally stock the full product range.

In 2003, all US Stores increased their focus on multiple fashion categories spanning Pop culture, Street, Urban, Movie & TV to complement the music, DVD and video games offers. Virgin Mobile products can also be found in separately run Virgin Mobile Concessions within most Virgin Megastores. Some shops also house cafes or coffee shops run by external companies.

== Technology ==
In 2005, Virgin Digital was launched to cater for those that bought their music digitally or wanted to rip and burn their current music collection. This is designed to add to the services provided by Virgin, rather than replace the Megastores. The download service faced some criticism from consumer groups due to its incompatibility with the popular iPod music player. The service has since been discontinued. Around the world there were other Virgin branded digital music retail websites, such as VirginMega.fr, France's number 2 music download website.

== Operations ==
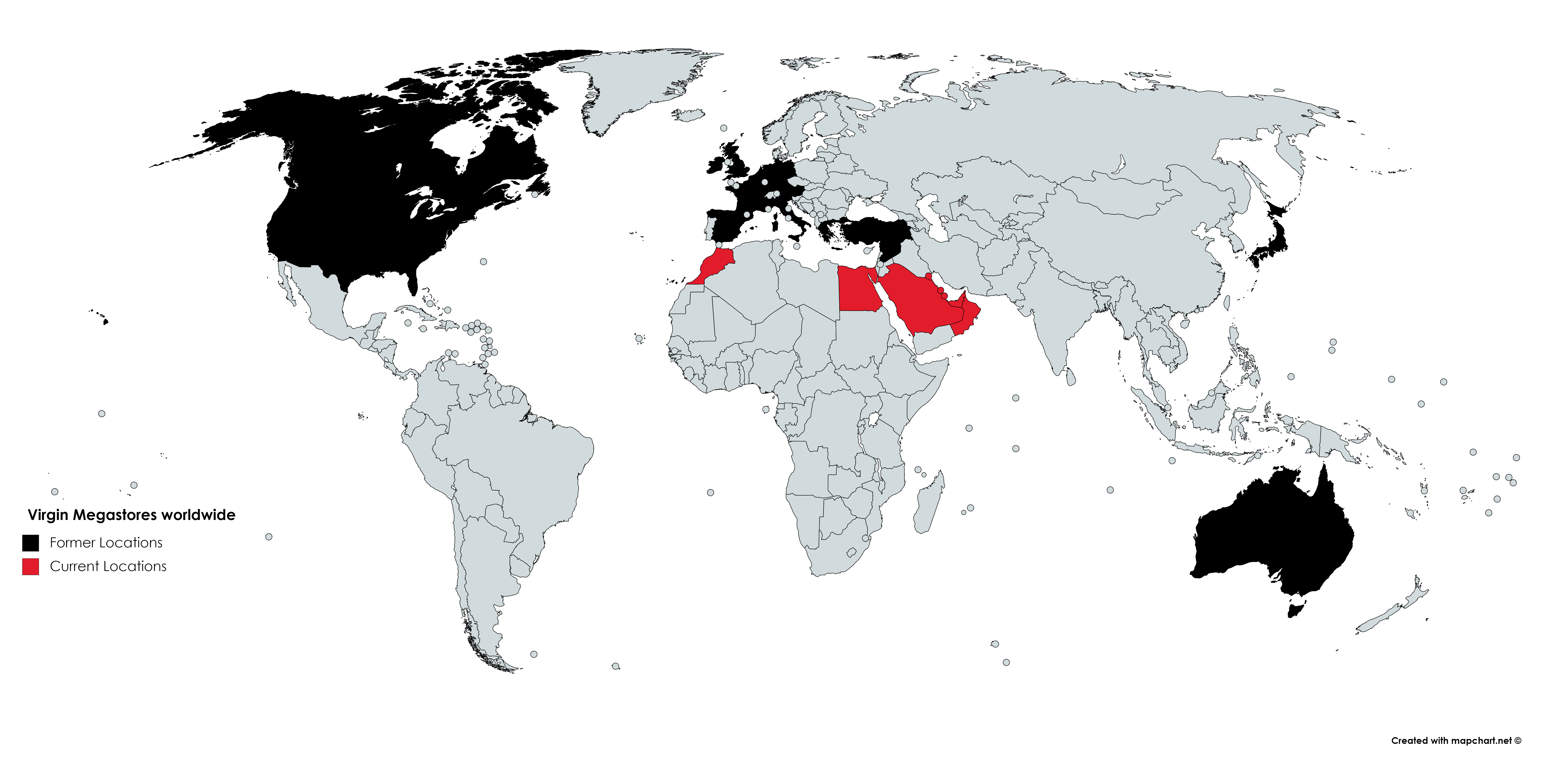
Legend: Former locations Current locations No data

=== Europe ===
==== Austria ====
In 2003, the first and only Virgin Megastore in Vienna, on Mariahilferstraße, was sold and closed.

==== France ====
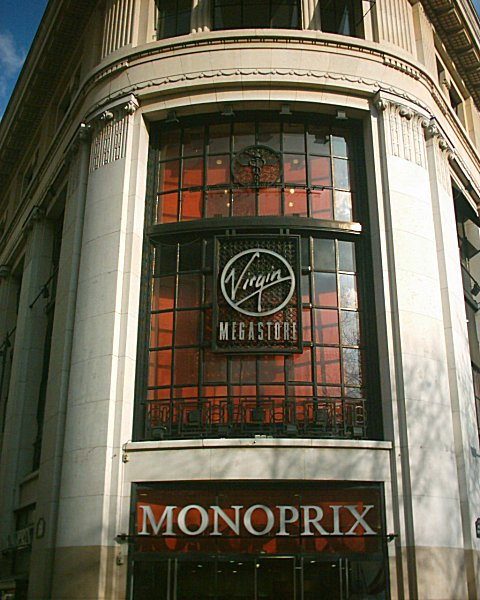
The façade of Virgin Megastore Paris (2006)

There were 35 Virgin Megastores in France. Twelve additional stores in France were branded Furet du Nord, and about ten international stores were owned by the same company. The French Megastore business was launched in 1988 by Branson and Patrick Zelnick, CEO of music publisher Naïve.

Lagardère Group bought the chain in 2001. In December 2007 Butler Capital Partners announced their intention to mount a majority takeover of the French arm of Virgin from Lagardère. This deal was finalised in February 2008. According to the Lagardère 2007 report, 80% of the Virgin stores was to be sold by Lagardère Services at a value of €76.4 million, and 20% would be kept. Prior to this sale 51% of VirginMega, France's number 2 music download website, was transferred to the Virgin Stores company (sold to Butler), and the remaining 49% was kept by Lagardère Active.

In July 2012, LS Travel Retail announced that they will phase out the Virgin Entertainment brand in France, commencing 2013, converting all remaining Virgin travel outlets into larger sized Fnac formats stocking the same range in addition to more product lines.

In January 2013, Virgin Megastore France filed for bankruptcy. At that time there were 26 Megastores in France, employing 1,000 people, after two years of cutting over 200 staff and several shops. The company had taken steps to terminate the lease on its flagship Champs-Élysées store in Paris after 25 years on the famous avenue. In June 2013 the company was finally liquidated and ceased operations after 25 years.

==== Germany ====
Virgin Megastore withdrew from the German market in 1994, amid complaints that the country's shop-closing law was too restrictive.

The Virgin name is used by the Lagardère Group to brand a small number of convenience stores within airports and railway stations. In September 2019 there were seven Virgin shops, of which four are in or adjacent to Frankfurt airport.

==== Greece ====
As of June 2005 there were 15 Virgin Megastores in Greece, operated by Vivere Entertainment. As of 2015, no Virgin Megastores exist in the country.

==== Hungary ====
In 1996, local merchandising group Fotex opened the first and only Hungarian Virgin Megastore (1000 m2) in the first "western" shopping mall, Duna Plaza, in Budapest. It was operated under a franchise until 2000. Between 2001 and 2006, Fotex operated the store as "Hungaroton Gigastore". The shop was closed in 2006 and no more Virgin Megastore shops were opened in Hungary.

==== Ireland ====
Virgin Megastores opened its first store in the Republic of Ireland in Dublin in 1986. More stores opened in Ireland from the early 1990s including Cork City. The company had planned to launch an online store specifically for the Republic of Ireland at virginmegastores.ie however plans were shelved when its Irish operations were sold in 2007. At its height of success the company owned 6 stores in the Republic of Ireland, however, by 2002 stores began to close. The Virgin Group sought to sell its Irish operations during 2007, and on 17 September 2007, it was announced Irish and UK stores would separate from the Virgin Group. A management buy-out offer was accepted. Stores were rebranded as Zavvi.

Following the collapse of Zavvi's supplier in December 2008, stores in Ireland were immediately closed in January 2009 with the hope Irish stores could be sold to another buyer unfortunately all were closed with some taken over by other music retailers.

==== Italy ====
In February 2004, the Virgin Megastore in Piazza Duomo Milan closed. Currently this building is occupied by a Mondadori retail store. After the Italian franchise Virgin Retail Italy filed for bankruptcy and liquidation, the Italian bankruptcy court ordered in May 2004 the immediate closure of three out of four of the remaining stores while allowing the store in Bergamo to remain open for a few additional months to allow the company to depose of its remaining inventory.

==== The Netherlands ====
Virgin Megastores entered the Dutch market in the 1990s and operated four stores (Amsterdam, Rotterdam, The Hague and Maastricht). In 2000, it decided to exit the market. Three stores were sold to the Free Record Shop group, while the Maastricht branch was closed. Free Record Shop also acquired three Virgin Megastores in Belgium.

==== Spain and Portugal ====
Virgin Retail España, S.L. opened its Barcelona store in November 1992, just after the Barcelona Olympics. This opening was followed by another Megastore in Seville (1993) however the opening of a flagship store in Madrid eluded the retailer, because at that time, cinemas and theatres in the Gran Vía (Madrid's most popular commercial thoroughfare) could not easily be reassigned for commercial use. The Spanish company diversified by opening small outlets in busy Spanish and Portuguese airports. In 1994, Virgin Retail España reached an agreement with the department store chain Galerías Preciados and opened small concessions in their Madrid stores (Callao, Goya, Serrano, La Vaguada and Parquesur). Galerías Preciados ceased trading the following year and Virgin Retail España quickly re-organised its operations and opened medium-sized stores in ABC Serrano (Madrid), La Coruña, Vigo, Málaga, Bilbao and Santander. Larger stores followed in Portugal (Lisbon and Oporto) but by 1997 the impact of digital technology had already hit their distribution model very hard. Music was by then being traded freely on the Internet but the major music labels did little to help support high street retailers. Inevitably, the Virgin Retail Group took the difficult strategic decision to close all of Virgin's high street stores in southern Europe. In July 1998 Virgin Megastores closed its southern European flagship store in Barcelona on the corner of Passeig de Gràcia and Gran Vía de les Corts Catalans. This building is currently occupied by Zara clothes store.

==== UK ====
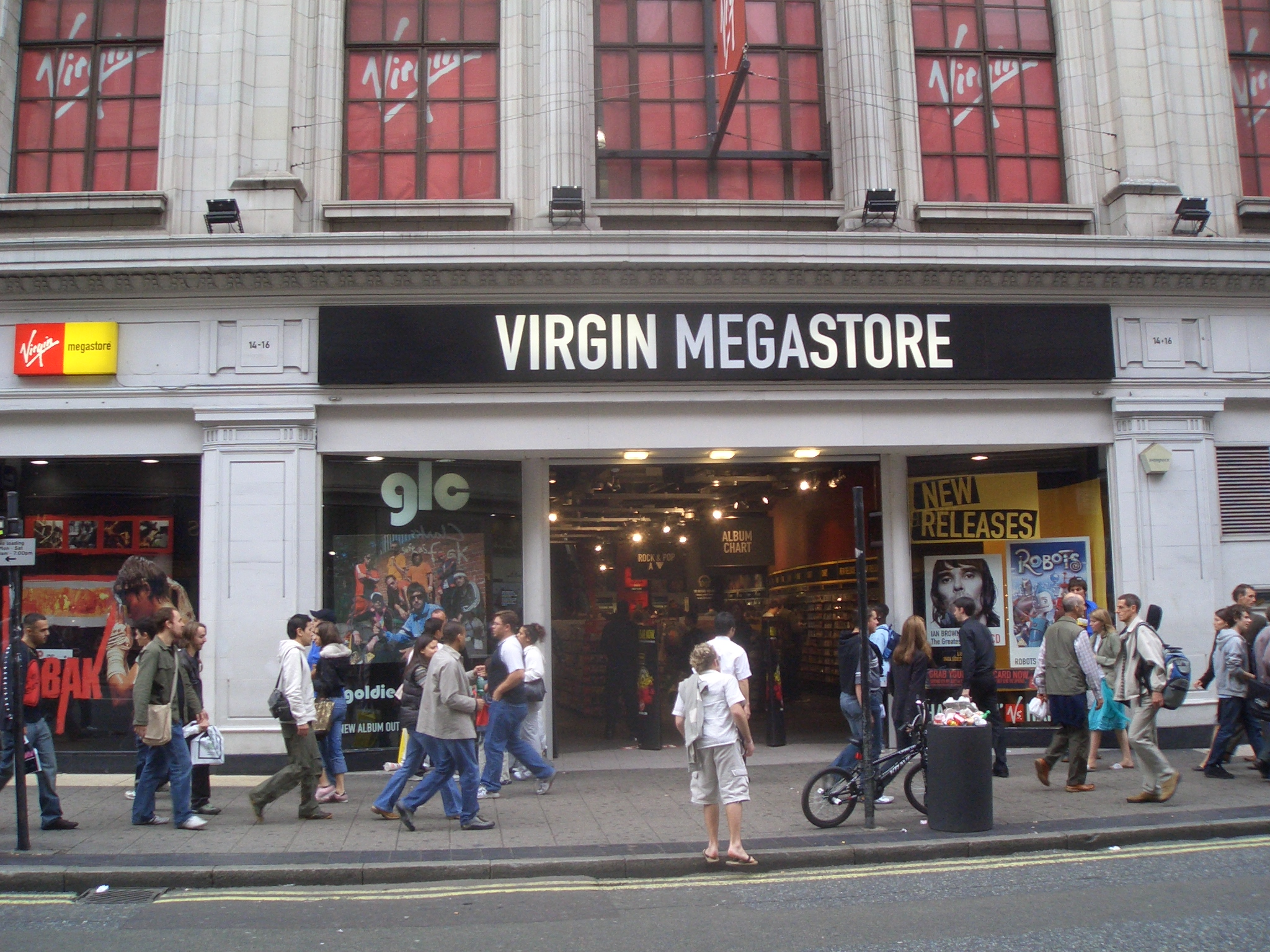
Former Virgin Megastore in Oxford Street – the chain's flagship shop (2005)

The first Virgin Megastore opened in the United Kingdom in 1979 and between the 1980s and 1990s, the chain grew, including via its merger with Our Price whilst under the ownership of WH Smith. By the 1990s Virgin Megastores had become an international franchise as part of the Virgin Group.

The Virgin Group sought to sell its UK and Ireland stores during 2007, and on 17 September 2007, it was announced that the UK and Ireland arm of the Virgin Megastores brand was to break away from the Virgin Group. A management buy-out offer was accepted. Stores were rebranded as Zavvi.

Following the collapse of Woolworths, which owned Zavvi's supplier Entertainment UK, Zavvi entered administration on 24 December 2008 as it had been unable to source stock from other suppliers under favourable terms. By February 2009 Zavvi had closed its stores, selling some to rival HMV, and a few to Simon Douglas and Les Whitfield's Head Entertainment.

==== Turkey ====
Virgin entered the Turkish market in March 2011 with a store located in the Demirören shopping centre on Istiklal Street near Taksim, Istanbul. The product mix of books, digital media and electronics failed to compete with better established chains and the store closed in autumn 2012.

=== Arab world ===
The Azadea Group of Beirut, Lebanon has an exclusive license since 2001 to operate Virgin Megastores in many countries within the Middle East, except for countries which already have a franchise. Operating as Virgin Megastores Middle East, Azadea has stores in UAE, Qatar, Bahrain, Egypt, Kuwait, and Jordan.

Megastores of Lebanon S.A.L. has an exclusive franchise to operate Virgin Megastores in Lebanon and Saudi Arabia.

Best Financière (Label Vie Carrefour) of Rabat has an exclusive license to operate Virgin Megastores within Morocco. Since 2010, Best has been opening a new store nearly every year.

Antar Group of Damascus has an exclusive to operate Virgin Megastores in Syria since 2007. Since the Syrian Civil War has caused most normal economic activities to virtually cease in the country since 2011, all megastores in the country are currently closed and may not return until political stability returns.

==== Lebanon ====
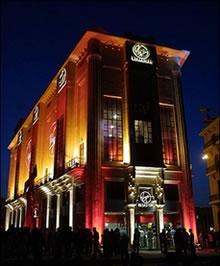
Beirut Central District, Lebanon, the first Virgin Megastore to open in the Middle East on 3 July 2001

Virgin's main store in Lebanon was located in the old Cinema Opera on Martyrs' Square, Beirut Central District; it opened on 3 July 2001 and was shut down in 2018. The four level store's inauguration was attended by Virgin's founder Sir Richard Branson. There are also smaller outlets at ABC Malls at Achrafieh, Dbayeh, Verdun and CityMall Dora, as well as in Beirut International Airport. New stores were opened in ABC Mall Dbayeh in November 2012 and ABC Mall Verdun in November 2017.

==== Saudi Arabia ====
First megastore in Riyadh opened in February 2015.

By December 2015, there were four Virgin Megastores in Saudi Arabia. They were located on Tahliah Street in the Roshana Centre, Red Sea Mall and on in Jeddah domestic airport in Jeddah and there's one at Dhahran Mall Eastern Province.

In November 2017, a fifth Saudi location was open at the Hayat Mall in Riyadh.

As of October 2025, Virgin Megastores in Saudi Arabia have closed down, possibly hinting at the closure of operations in the country.

==== Bahrain ====
As of September 2008, there is currently one Virgin Megastore in Bahrain. It is in the Bahrain City Centre.

==== Egypt ====
The first Egyptian store was opened at the City Stars Mall in Cairo in October 2005. Six years later, a second location was opened at the Mall of Arabia in 6th of October City in December 2011. A third location was opened at the Festival City Mall in Cairo in June 2015. And the 4th and newest branch opened in Mall of Egypt on 27 September 2017.

==== Kuwait ====
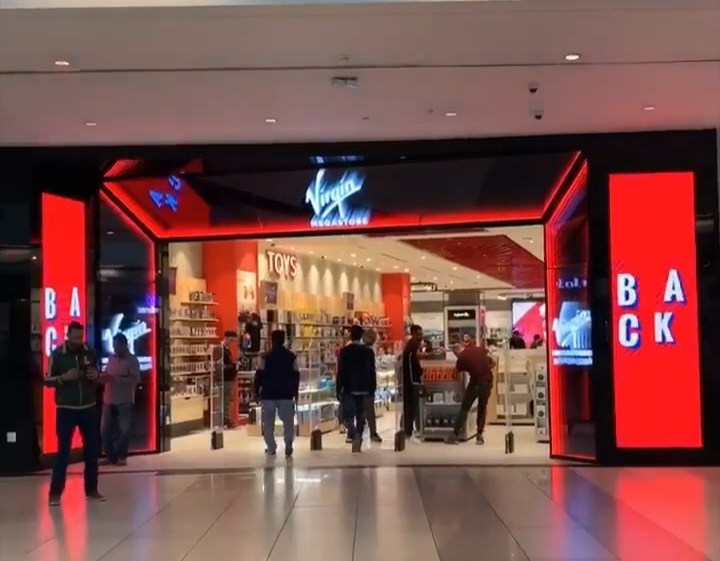
Virgin Megastore at The Avenue Mall in Kuwait (2020)

The first location in Kuwait opened in 2002. By May 2008, there were two Virgin Megastores in Kuwait, one at Marina Mall in Salmiya and the other at the airport. However, by late 2011 the airport branch was shut down, while the second branch shut down in March 2012.

After a seven-year absence, Virgin Megastores returned to Kuwait in February 2020 by opening its first new store there at The Avenues Mall.

==== Qatar ====
Virgin Megastores currently has six stores in Qatar, with one being located in the Villaggio Mall (an Italian-themed mall), Doha which is the shopping centre's main anchor. In November 2008 they opened a smaller store in a shopping centre called Landmark. Other locations includes Mall of Qatar, Qatar Mall, Doha Festival City, Hamad International Airport (departure area) and a small kiosk at The Pearl.

==== United Arab Emirates ====
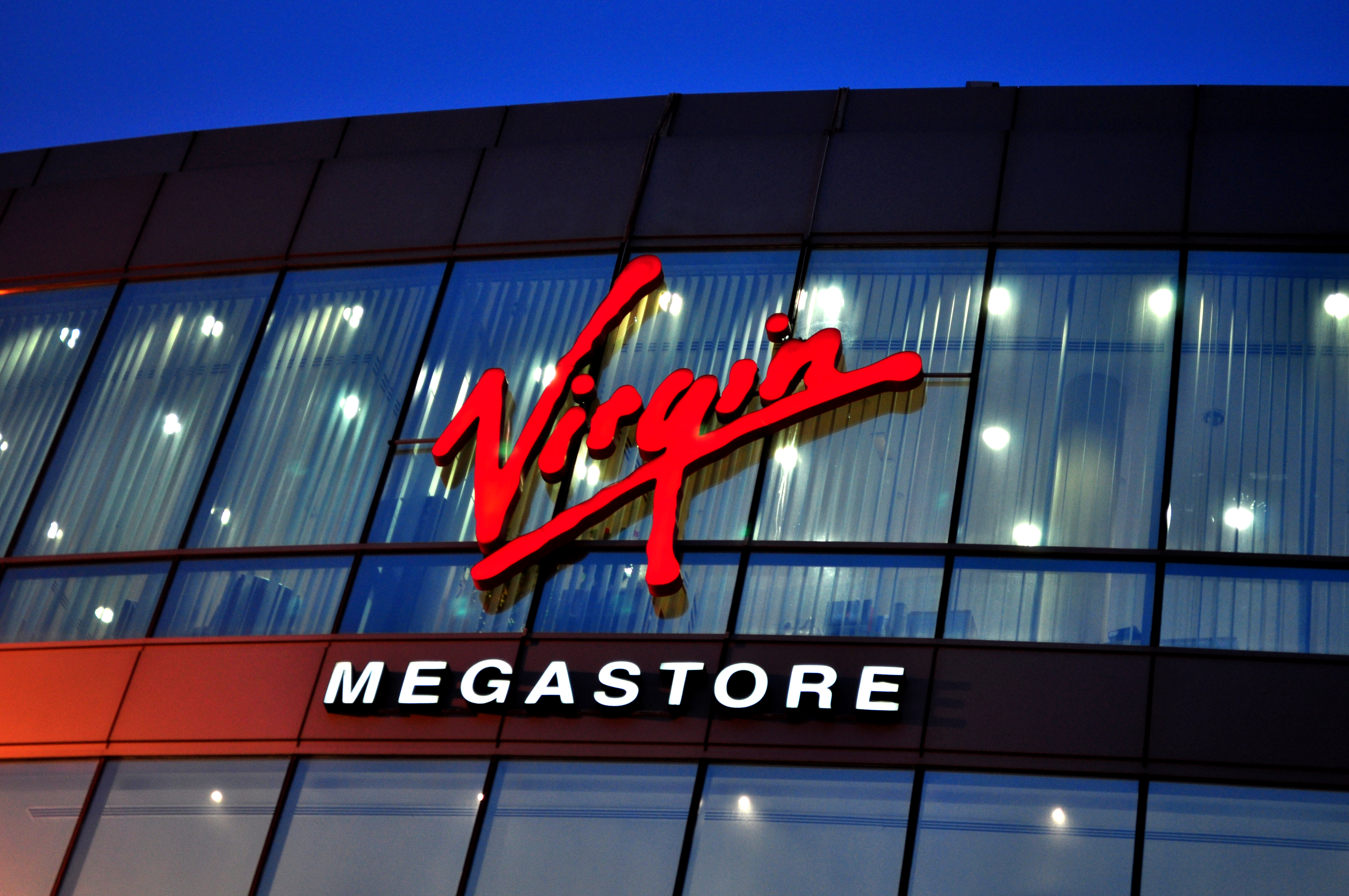
Virgin Megastore in Dubai (2012)

The first Virgin Megastore in the United Arab Emirates in September 2001 at the Deira City Centre in Dubai, two months after the opening in Beirut. A few months later, the second store in the country was opened in Abu Dhabi in October 2001. A fourth store in UAE opened in Jumeirah in 2002.

By October 2005, there were four stores in the UAE, with stores at the Deira City Center, at Burjuman and at Mercato Mall in Dubai and at the Abu Dhabi Mall in Abu Dhabi. A month later, Branson was present at the Virgin Megastores opening at the Mall of the Emirates in Dubai.

Sometime between 2009 and 2010, the ownership for the Virgin Megastore franchise in the United Arab Emirates and the Middle East was transferred from Star Multimedia to Virgin Megastores Middle East, Azadea Group. By May 2010, stores were also added at the Mirdif City Centre and at the Jumeira Beach residence in Dubai to make a total of seven stores in the UAE.

The eighth store in the UAE was opened in September 2011 at the Dubai Mall in Dubai. The Jumeirah Beach residence appeared to have been closed sometime before September 2012, bringing the store count back down to seven.

A second store in Abu Dhabi opened at the Al Wahda Mall in November 2012.

As of November 2012, there were eight Virgin Megastores in the UAE six of which are located in Dubai.

In December 2014, a store was opened at the Yas Mall in Abu Dhabi. The thirteenth store in the UAE was opened at the Al Jimi Mall in Al Ain in July 2015.

However, some stores—including Deira City Centre and Al Wahda Mall—were later closed, likely due to shifting retail dynamics and footfall. As of 2025, Virgin Megastore operates 13 outlets in the UAE across Dubai, Abu Dhabi, Al Ain, and other emirates. It remains one of the brand’s strongest markets globally.

Apart from being a general entertainment retailer, these Megastores also act as ticketing counters, and host live events with artist signings and appearances, performances, quiz nights. They also feature a boutique section offering everything from movie memorabilia to jewellery. Select locations—including Dubai Mall and Mall of the Emirates—also feature in-store gadget repair counters operated by Fixsquad, the brand’s official service partner. These counters also provide walk-in support for smartphones, laptops, and other devices.

This store is quite popular among locals and expats in the country, as this is the only store where they sell more music than most stores in the country, which also explains why the country has more branches than the other Gulf countries.

==== Jordan ====
The first Virgin Megastore in Jordan opened in Amman at the City Mall in September 2007. A second location, also in Amman, was opened at the TAJ Lifestyle Center in October 2015.

==== Morocco ====
In 2007, Best Financière (Label Vie Carrefour) of Rabat received a franchise from Lagardère to operate Virgin Megastores in Morocco. The first store in Morocco opened at the Almazar mall in Marrakesh in April 2010. A second store was opened in Rabat (Kitéa Géant Mall) in December 2012 which was quickly followed weeks later by the openings of two additional stores in Casablanca (AnfaPlace Shopping Center) and Fez (Borj Fez Mall). A fifth store was opened in downtown Casablanca in September 2015. In August 2016, a sixth store was opened on the property of a Carrefour Store located in the Sidi Maârouf Neighbourhood next to the city of Casablanca.

==== Syria ====
In 2007, Antar Group of Damascus was awarded a franchise by Lagardère to operate Virgin Megastores in Syria. The Antar Group was in the process of opening a store in the Al Shahba Mall in Aleppo when the Syrian Civil War broke out in 2011. The business has since closed after the mall had been heavily damaged during the fighting.

==== Oman ====
The first Virgin Megastore in Oman opened in Muscat in November 2015 at the Muscat City Centre.

=== North America ===
==== United States ====
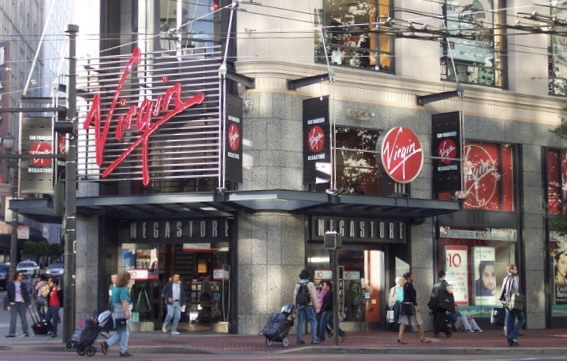
Virgin Megastore in San Francisco (2004)

In 1992, the Virgin Group and Blockbuster entered into a joint venture to set up the first Virgin Megastore on Sunset Strip in Los Angeles, which was closed in 2008. The US Megastore business was launched in 1992 by Richard Branson and Ian Duffell, CEO of Virgin Entertainment Group. At its peak, there were 23 Megastores in the U.S. which generated $310 million annually. The U.S. stores were purchased by Related Companies and Vornado Realty Trust in 2007 for the purpose of closing the stores and to break the long term long rental leases.

===== Store closures =====
Under new ownership, eleven stores were gradually closed in 2007. On 2 March 2009, it was announced that all Virgin Megastores in the United States would close.

The store at Arden Fair Mall in Sacramento, CA, closed in 2005 and was converted to an Urban Outfitters, while the Grapevine Mills location was closed at the end of 2008. Related Companies announced that the Virgin Megastore flagship store in Times Square would close by April 2009, with the space being replaced by Forever 21. On 25 February 2009, it was announced that the stores in San Francisco and Union Square (New York) would close in April and May, respectively, and the announcement of all stores closing followed soon thereafter. On 12 May 2009, the Virgin Megastore at Downtown Disney (now Disney Springs) at Walt Disney World closed permanently. As of September 2012, the last remaining Virgin Books & Music outlet operated in Terminal 3 at John F. Kennedy International Airport. Both airport locations closed by the middle of 2013. The JFK Airport location was closed by the time Terminal 3 was demolished and converted into a parking lot in 2013.

===== In-stores =====
Most locations included an in-store radio station, branded Virgin Radio. U.S. Virgin Radio was not a broadcast radio station, but a DJ operated hard-lines system which broadcast throughout the store, and the complex in which the store was located. At the Times Square location, DJ selections were heard on the retail floor, in the office areas, processing areas, and even out on the shop's Broadway sidewalk frontage.

All employees of the U.S. Virgin Megastores could be identified by their trademark red or black t-shirts which had the Virgin logo on the front and the word STAFF on the back, as well as required lanyards with their first name printed on them.

===== Technology =====
The Virgin Megastore chain in the U.S. had a different GSA look-up system to other the international arms of the chain. This system was a private network that linked all North American stores, updating each shop's product inventory every 24 to 48 hours.

American Virgin Megastores implemented a near real-time data warehouse in 2004. The data warehouse named 'Crescendo' collects POS transactions, along with customer traffic counts and generates KPI reports in near real-time. The near real-time information helped the managers identify trends quicker and react accordingly. The U.S. stores shared their experience with the real-time warehouse and the UK stores also used similar process.

Virgin Megastore (U.S.) had a Customer Loyalty Program named 'Virgin V.I.P.' The Program used a read/write 'GraphiCard'. Every time a member purchase is made, the Graphicard was swiped through the POS Graphicard Terminal. Members points were instantly updated on the face of the card. The website shared the loyalty program with the U.S. stores.

===== Website =====
Virgin Megastores U.S. website is VirginMega.com. In 2002 this website became co-branded with Amazon, and was powered by Amazon. Later in 2002 VirginMega.co.jp, the Japanese equivalent, followed suit. In 2007 the website was again changed, when Virgin Megastores partnered with Baker & Taylor. On 31 May 2009 VirginMega.com ceased operating.

==== Canada ====
The first and only Virgin Megastore in Canada opened in December 1996 at 750 Burrard Street, at the corner of Robson Street and Burrard Street in Vancouver, British Columbia. The 40,000-square-foot (3,700 m^{2}), three-level store was located in Downtown Vancouver, the city's busiest and most prestigious retail destination. The building was previously home to the central branch of the Vancouver Public Library. The Virgin Megastore ceased its operations in Vancouver on 4 September 2005 when on 28 June 2005, HMV Canada announced it was planning to expand the store and rebrand the location into the HMV brand. The acquisition took effect immediately after the closure and on 5 September 2005, HMV was opened. With the dominance of HMV in Canada, Virgin thus decided to exit the Canadian market entirely. This Vancouver HMV location would later close in 2012.

There were also plans to build its second Canadian store at Metropolis (later Toronto Life Square, now 10 Dundas East) in Downtown Toronto, just south of the since-closed Sam the Record Man flagship store as well as HMV's existing Toronto flagship. However, the exit from Canada resulted in the cancellation of these plans. An Adidas Performance store stands where Virgin would have.

=== Oceania ===
==== Australia ====
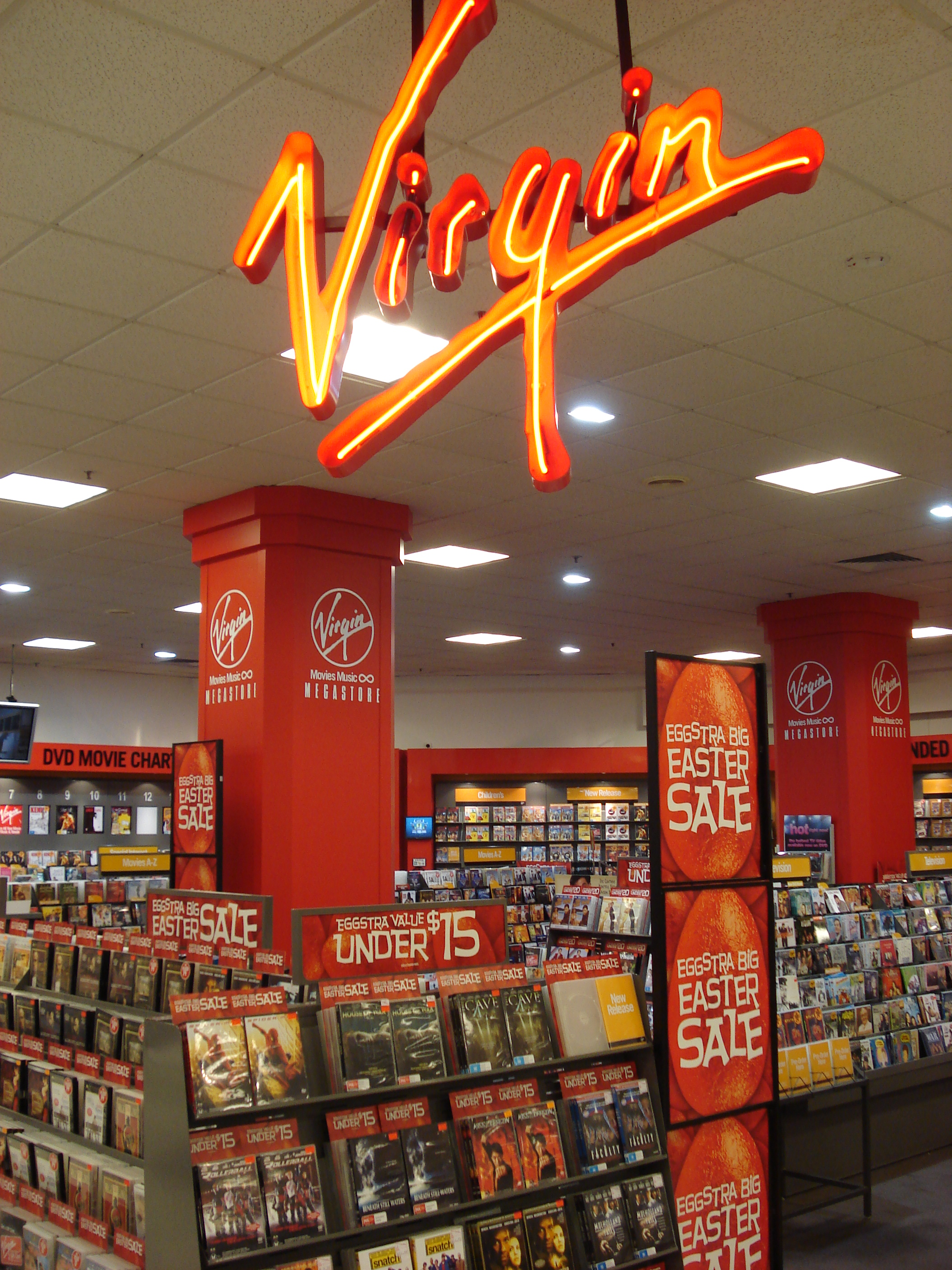
A Virgin Megastore in Brisbane (2007)

The first Australian Megastore was launched in 1988 by Richard Branson and Ian Duffell, CEO Virgin Megastores Asia-Pacific. Between 1988 and 1992 Megastores were opened in Sydney, Melbourne and Adelaide. In 1992, the Virgin Group and Blockbuster Inc. entered into a joint venture. This lasted until Virgin sold their interest in the six stores to Blockbuster, who promptly rebranded them in 1993 to Blockbuster Music.

In October 2001, Ian Duffell, managing director of Brazin Limited (owner of Australia's largest entertainment retailer, Sanity) reintroduced Virgin Megastores in the country via two related transactions with the Virgin Group, acquiring 77 troubled Our Price music stores in the UK for a symbolic £2, and in turn gaining exclusive license rights in Australia for Virgin Entertainment, initially setting up the first Virgin Megastore on Chapel Street's, The Jam Factory in April 2002. Brazin also intended to use the Virgin brand to open 45 new Megastores in addition to converting 55 of its existing small-scale IN2 Music stores that had not already been rebranded as Sanity. Yet, the programme stalled as Brazin battled internal disruptions and struggled to separate the target-markets for Virgin and its chain of more than 200 Sanity stores (at the time). As a result, the company's entertainment division posted a $27 million loss in financial year, 2002–03, and by mid-2004, Brazin had only managed to open 12 Virgin Megastores.

In September 2003, Brazin sold out of its 118-store Sanity UK (former Our Price and VShop outlets) store network to Primemist Limited. In July 2004, Brazin entered into an agreement with Coles Myer to open 62 Virgin concept stores within the Myer department store chain. Brazin agreed to buy all of Myer's remaining CD and DVD stock, recruit, train and pay their own staff, and work within Myer's systems and promotions. These concept stores were marketed separately to stand-alone Virgin Megastores (due to their more limited stock availability) and branded, Virgin at Myer. This solved Brazin's problem since 2002 by separating the Virgin and Sanity target markets by making Virgin more "family orientated" while leaving Sanity's "street edge" to continue. Exactly a year later, Brazin stated that after a rocky start (with staff recruitment issues and aligning products with the typical Myer customer), Virgin at Myer was up 45 per cent on comparative sales and was performing well.

In December 2004, HDS Retail Asia Pacific opened Australia's first Virgin Books and Music travel outlet at Melbourne Airport. Since then, the company – now known as LS Travel Retail – opened another five Virgin outlets at other major capital city airports in addition to one railway outlet at Southern Cross station in Melbourne. Yet, by early 2012, all of these stores have been closed.

By mid-2010, Sanity Entertainment (formerly Brazin Limited) closed all Virgin Megastores. Also, in August of that year, all Virgin at Myer concept stores stopped operating under the Virgin brand due to Sanity Entertainment not renewing their contract with Myer Holdings (formerly Coles Myer) and were either closed or converted back into a basic audio/visual department operated by Myer (in 2011, these non-branded audio/visual departments were later closed by Myer anyway). Sanity elected to exit the Virgin brand despite the licensing deal running until 2015.

Virgin Entertainment's Australian peak was reached in 2006 with 24 Virgin Megastores, 62 Virgin at Myer outlets, and 2 Virgin Books and Music stores in operation. As of September 2012, Australia contains no more Virgin Entertainment outlets.

=== Asia ===
==== Japan ====
In 1990 Virgin Megastores Japan Limited was started as a 50/50 venture between Marui and the Virgin Entertainment Group. In September 1990, the first Japanese Virgin Megastore opened in Shinjuku. During the 1990s, more Megastores were opened all over Japan. On 19 September 2002, following its American counterpart, the VirginMega.co.jp website became powered by Amazon.co.jp. This website has since disappeared.

In 2005 Culture Convenience Club bought Virgin Megastore's operations (totalling 22 stores) in Japan from Marui Co. By November 2008, the number of Virgin Megastores in Japan had lessened to 15. Culture Convenience Club's licensing contract with Virgin Group for the use of the Virgin Megastore brand had expired, and there was no desire to renew it. As of November 2008, Culture Convenience Club's subsidiary company, Tsutaya Stores Holdings Co., acquired Virgin Megastores Japan Co. Virgin Megastores Japan were rebranded as Tsutaya by early 2009.

==== China ====
In November 2007, HDS Retail Asia Pacific (now known as LS Travel Retail) opened China's first and only Virgin Books and Music travel outlet at Hongqiao International Airport in Shanghai. As of June 2012, it is still in operation.

== Virgin Books and Music ==
Virgin Books and Music is a Virgin-branded entertainment retail chain exclusive to airports and travel locations, operated by the Lagardère Services division of the French conglomerate Lagardère Group. Such stores have a much smaller size than Virgin Megastores and currently operate in 10 countries: Canada, China, Germany, Kuwait, Lebanon, Morocco, Poland, Spain, the United Kingdom. All locations in US airports/travel locations closed in 2009.
