= Debbane Palace =

Historical building and museum in Sidon, Lebanon

- قصر دبانة
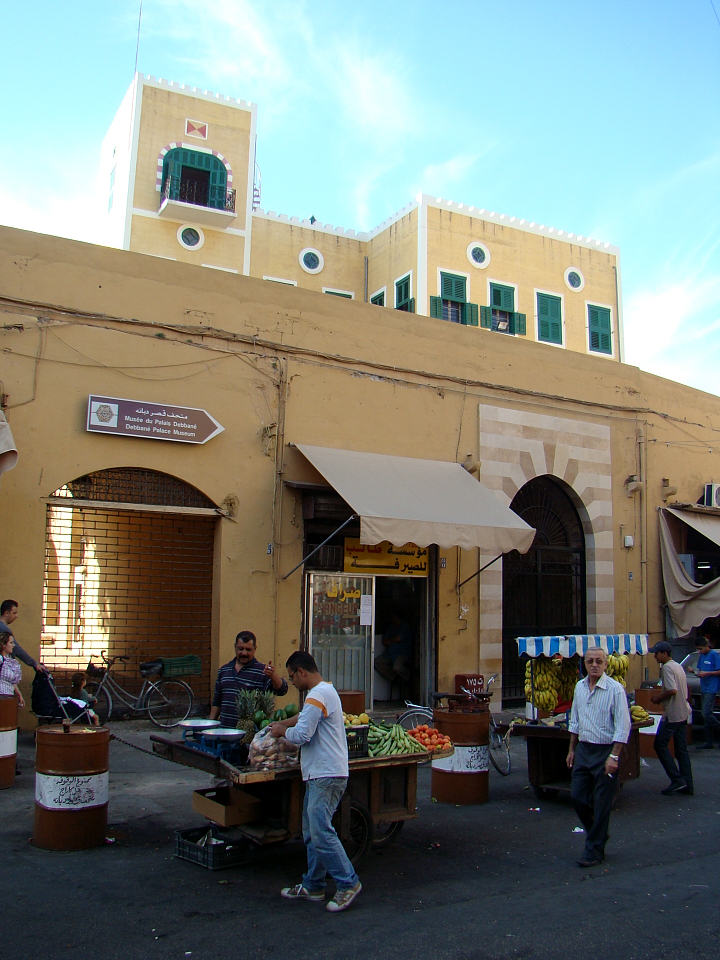
- Entrance to the Debbane palace from the Saida old souk.

- Location within Lebanon
- Former names: Dar Ali Agha Hammoud, Qasr Hammoud
- Alternative names: Qasr Debbane

General information
- Status: Used as a museum
- Location: Sidon, Lebanon
- Coordinates: 33°33′54″N 35°22′17″E
- Construction started: 1721

Debbane Palace (Arabic: قصر دبانة), also Qasr Debbane, Dar Ali Agha al-Hammud, and Dar Debbané, is an Arab-Ottoman-style grand mansion in Sidon, Lebanon. The palace was built as a private residence in 1721 by Ali Agha al-Hammud, a Sidonian notable descending from a long line of builders. The palace was built around a central courtyard without any street-level openings to ensure the privacy of its occupants. Only the reception area or selamlik remains of the palace's original wings; it features an indoor fountain, elaborate multicolored mosaics, muqarnas ornaments and sculpted Lebanese cedar ceilings.

The palace changed hands and functions after the loss of the Hammuds' political influence and wealth. The western part of the mansion, including the selamlik was bought in 1859 by Asin Khlat Debbane, the wife of a rich sericulturist and silk trader. The Dar was thenceforth known as Qasr Debbane or Debbane Palace; it became the private residence of the Debbane family until the early years of the Lebanese Civil War in 1976. During the war, the palace was damaged and ransacked. After the end of the war, the palace was restored and turned into a private museum.

== History ==
=== Historical background ===
During the 15th-century reign of Sultan Mehmed II, the Ottomans introduced the Iltizam tax-farming system in which a mültezim was responsible for collecting revenue from a mukataa, a parcel of land owned by the Ottoman crown. The term of an Iltizam ranged from one to twelve years. In 1695, the Iltizam was superseded by the Malikâne system where tax-farming contracts were granted for life, and a tenant could give the tax-farm to an heir if the treasury agreed. Under both systems, revenue collection rights were awarded to the highest bidder who could keep profits after forwarding to the Sublime Porte (imperial government). The aʿyan, a class of local notables or dynasts, developed into the chief owners of these rights. They were more efficient than the governors in the preceding Timar system at forwarding revenues to Porte, and their local nature afforded them more knowledge of the region's politics and a vested interest in its success.

The Hammud aʿyan established themselves in the port city of Sidon in the 16th or 17th century and became its tax collectors from the early 18th century. They benefited from the 1695 fiscal reform, which granted them lifetime Malikâne, thereby increasing their political power and wealth significantly. Before the "age of aʿyan", urban development had been the privilege of non-local Ottoman officials; the Hammuds were prime among other Sidonian notables to sponsor large-scale urban development projects, including the construction of commanding private residences, mosques, public hammams (bathhouses), khans (caravanserais) and schools, among other buildings. Mustafa Katkhuda, a Hammud notable of the first half of the 17th century, was the first to leave material architectural evidence of the family's involvement in urban development. Katkhuda commissioned Sidon's Kikhiya mosque in 1634–1645. In the early 18th century, Mustafa Agha al-Hammud was the first Hammud to be identified in written records. (Note: Mustafa Agha al-Hammud was unfavorably mentioned in several French consular reports dating from when his buildings were being constructed. In addition to his building activity, he was involved in the restoration of other estates in his capacity as mutawalli of waqfs, a caretaker of a plot or a building owned by an Islamic charitable trust. Mustafa died around 1721, at that time he was no longer mentioned in consular reports.) He was a prolific builder; among his commissions are the city's Hammam al-Jadid (New Bathhouse) and the enlargement of the Bahri Mosque. The family's building activity was continued by Mustafa's son Ali Agha al-Hammud, who had become Sidon's tax farmer around the late 1710s and held that position until c. 1735; Ali was, like Mustafa a waqf (religious endowment) trustee, he also commanded, with his brother Othman, Janissary troops at the service of the Wali of Sidon. He commissioned two of the city's most prestigious private residences to showcase his wealth; (Note: Ali Agha al-Hammud's private residences include his eponymous Dar and another mansion that was repurposed as a school and is now known as Madrasat al-Aisha.) he also commissioned public amenities including Khan al-Hummus and Hammam al-Ward (Rose Bathhouse).

=== History of the palace ===
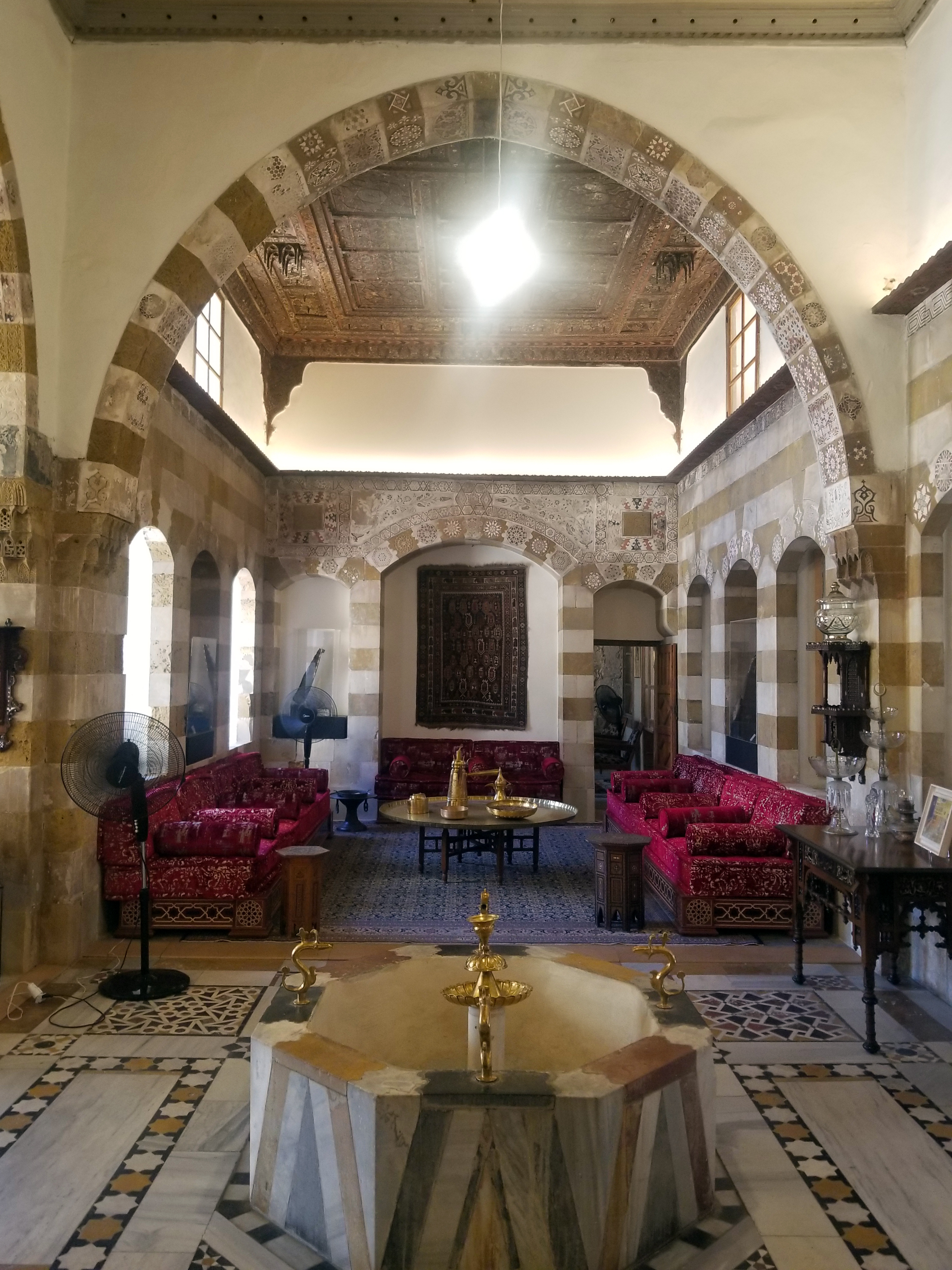
One of the halls of the Selamlik at the Debbane palace

Dar Ali Agha al-Hammud was built in 1721 by Ali Agha al-Hammud in the eastern part of Sidon's medina. He repurposed a guard tower he commanded, his namesake Burj ʿAli (Arabic: برج علي, lit. 'Tower of Ali') that stood close to Sidon's Bab Beirut (Beirut gate), transforming it into the core of his private residence. He expanded the structure, integrating the original tower into a larger domestic complex. A wall inscription above the door to the qaʿa (guestroom) dating to 1730–1731 (1143 AH) asserts that Ali al-Hammud was the patron of the house. In the late 1730s, Ahmad al-Hammud inherited the public functions of his father Ali. Ahmad ran into many lawsuits and financial problems in addition to his uneasy relations with the Ottoman governor of Sidon. He was accused of selling waqf properties to the French. In 1739, he was appointed mutassallim (deputy governor) of Sidon but eventually lost his political influence and source of wealth with the rise to power of the local Acre-based chief and tax farmer Zahir al-Umar. With Ahmad's demise, the Hammuds' urban development activity ceased. After the Hammuds' loss of influence the family mansion was transformed into the seat of an Ottoman governmental office. In 1871 city archives the mansion is described as a saray (government headquarters) and in 1901 as the Dar al-Hukuma al-Qadima (Old Government Headquarters), indicating that it was used at the time as a local Ottoman administrative building.

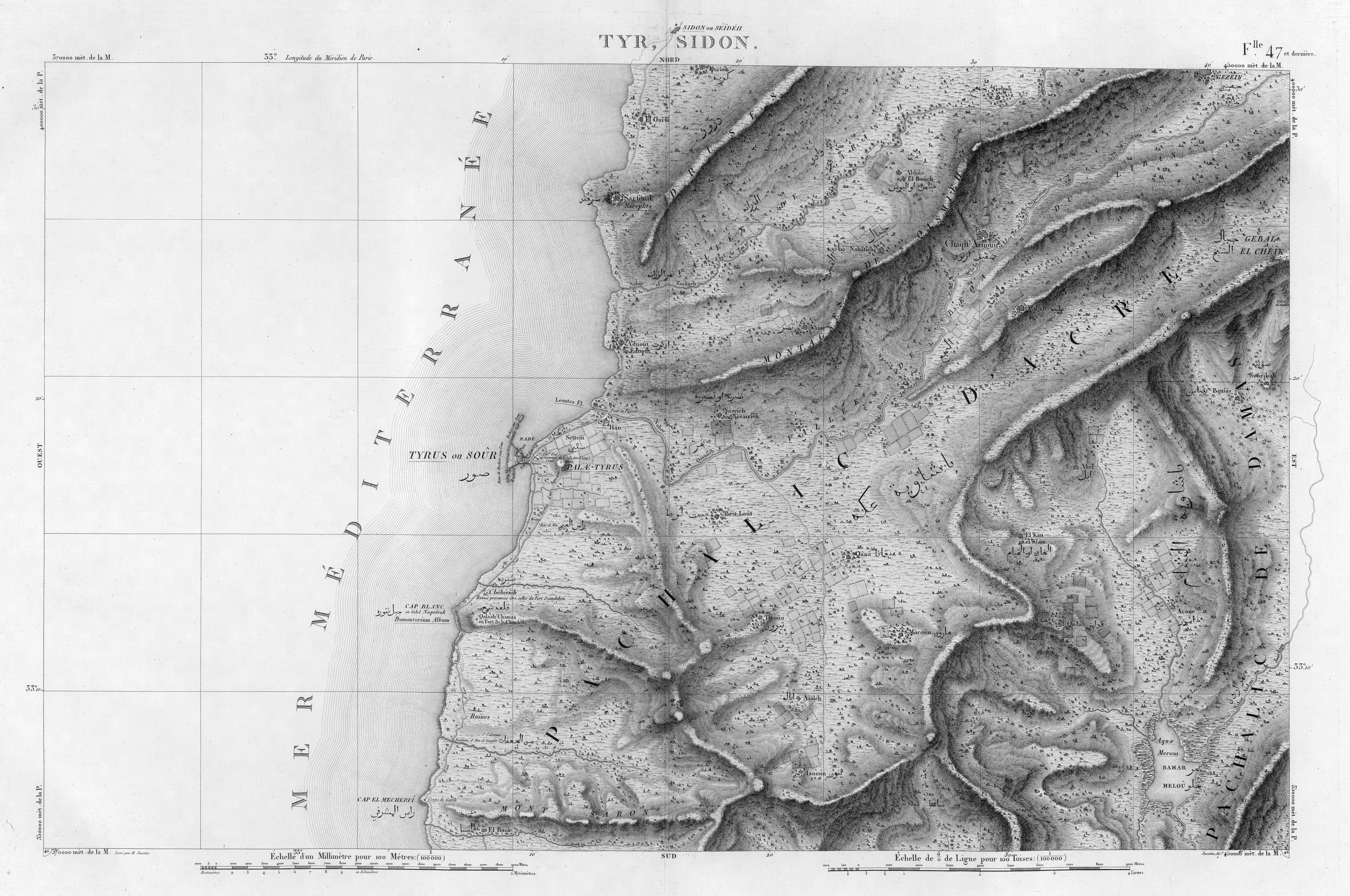
Sidon on an 1800 map. Sidon was the capital of its namesake province until Jazzar Ahmed Pasha moved the capital to Acre in 1775.

In 1856, the Sacy family acquired the haremlik (harem quarters) at the eastern end of the mansion as their private palace. The western part of the mansion, including the selamlik (Ottoman reception hall), was bought in 1859 by Asin Khlat, the wife of Youssef Debbane, a rich sericulturist and silk trader. The Dar was thenceforth known as Qasr Debbane or Debbane Palace; it became the private residence of the Debbane family since 1859 until the early years of the Lebanese Civil War in 1976. During the war, Sidon was shelled, and then-owner Mary Audi-Debbane moved to Beirut, leaving the palace unattended. The palace was squatted by hundreds of Palestinian refugees, who fled the conflict in the city of Tyre in February 1978; the palace was further damaged and ransacked by militiamen who squatted there in 1983. The qasr was listed as a historical monument by the Lebanon's Ministry of Culture in 1968. In 1999 Georges, François, Jean Debbane, and Marie Debbane-Naggear renounced their rights of ownership as heirs to the Debbané Foundation. The Debbané Foundation is a Melkite religious waqf, managed by a committee representing the Debbane family, the director general of Antiquities of Lebanon, the mayor of the city, and the Greek-Catholic bishop of Saida. The palace was restored by the Debbané Foundation in 2000 at an approximate cost of $2.5 million. The palace was opened as a private museum during the UNESCO 2001 seminar in Saïda.

== Architecture ==
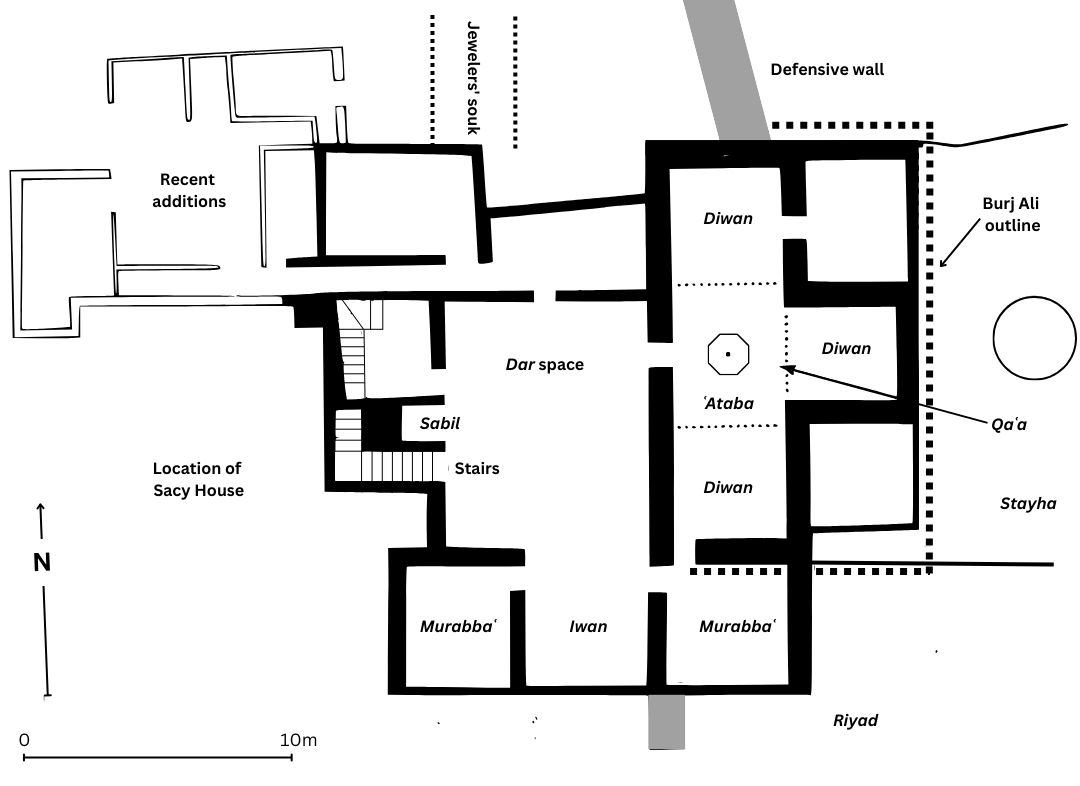
Debbane Palace first floor plan showing the contours of Burj Ali (dotted line to the right), the defensive tower once commanded by, and named after Ali Agha al-Hammud.

The palace was built in the Arab-Ottoman style with characteristic architectural features of a house with a central courtyard. This architectural archetype ensured the inhabitants' privacy by removing street-facing openings. The ground floor is occupied by shops, a deprecated stable and a garden. The courtyard is elevated from the street level; it is accessible by a narrow staircase and an entrance porch that opens to the souk. The courtyard has a water fountain at its center and gives access to all the 18th-century palace wings, including the selamlik and the now destroyed private haramlik, now part of the neighbouring Sacy House. The surviving selamlik includes reception halls and the Damascene-style decorated grand qaʿa. The T-shaped qaʿa comprises a raised sitting area (tazar) where the owner's guests of honor would be seated on diwans. The tazar is preceded by a ʿataba, a reception area one step lower than the tazar, where regular guests were received. The interior features typical bichrome ablaq ornamentation, consisting of alternating rows of differently colored stonework around windows, doors, and select walls. The qaʿa is decorated with multicolored mosaics, and the arch springings are feature muqarnas ornaments. A few rooms still maintain original sculpted Lebanese cedar ceilings. The central courtyard leads also to a north-facing iwan, (Note: A summer room consisting of a vaulted hall walled on three sides, with one end entirely open by a large pointed arch.) flanked by two square reception rooms (Murabbaʿ), and various service areas. The floor is covered with polychrome marquetry on a white marble base.

=== Alterations ===
Of the Palace's original 18th-century plan, only the selamlik, iwan, and service areas remain, the haremlik being destroyed during the 19th century. To accommodate their growing family, the Debbanes added two levels to the palace in the Levantine neo-Classical style during renovations undertaken between 1917 and 1920. The open courtyard was vertically extended by the addition of a gallery covered by a four-sided red tile roof. The new gallery was designed in the Damascene style, with ablaq (alternating) motifs running on all its sides. The third floor consists of a single, distinct space, the tayyara—a tall, a tower-like structure with a crenellated parapet, which according to the Lebanese historian and scholar May Davie, evokes the building’s former role as a tower, now a tower-house integrated into the city’s defensive system. The tayyara is a leisurely area, offering panoramic views of Sidon and its hinterland, while also serving as the coolest spot during hot summer evenings. The new floors are accessed by an interior staircase with a wooden banister, opening on a ramp providing access to the upper level. Multiple pointed-arch windows with polychrome stained glass surround the gallery and light up the space.

== Collections and exhibition spaces ==
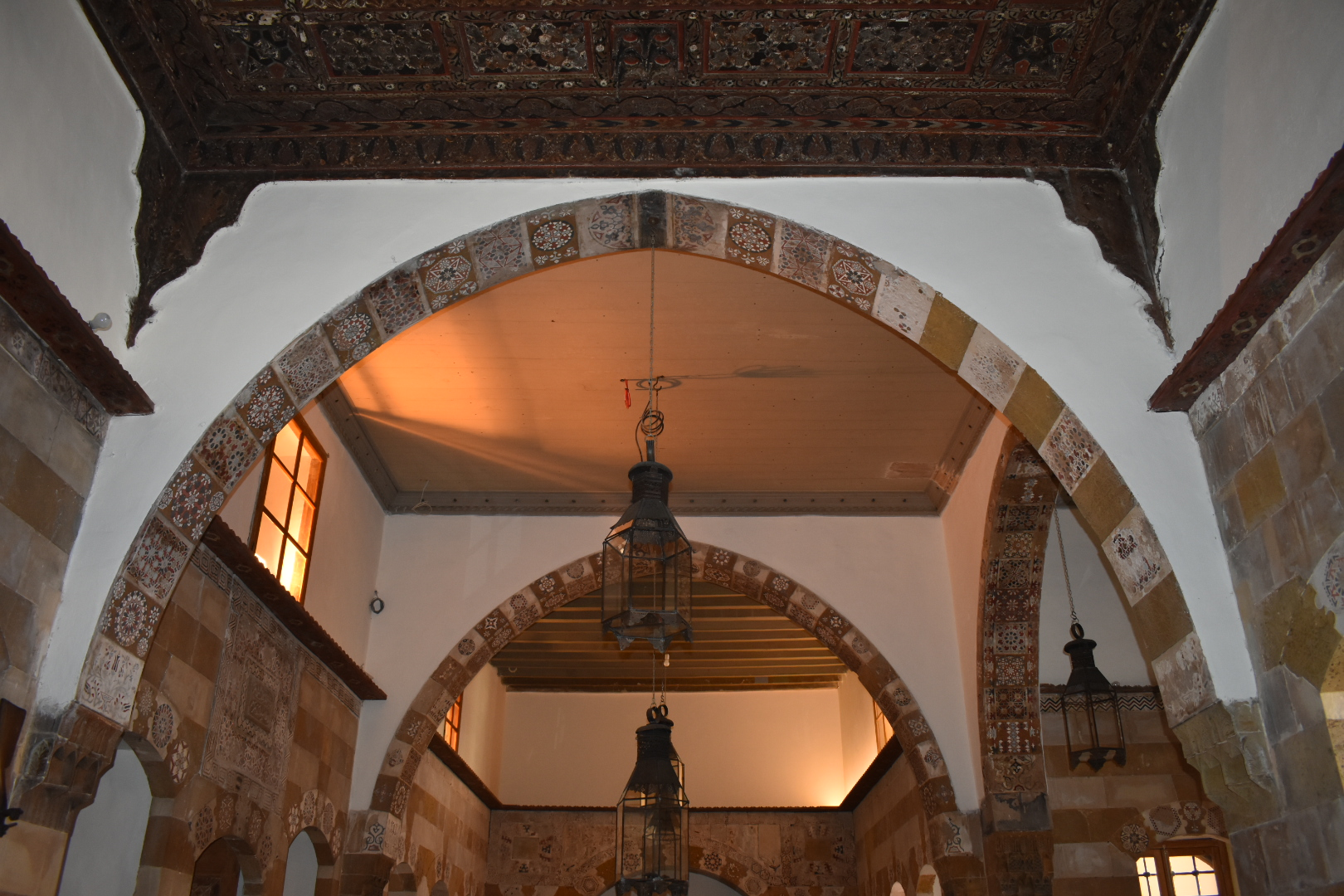
Celining and arch decorations of the qaʿa

The Debbane Palace ground floor's stately chambers and furnishings provide a glimpse of a traditional Ottoman house. In addition to Ottoman era furniture and décor, the selamlik chambers hold a collection of Ottoman-era wood and ivory-inlaid musical instruments from Syria including ouds and buzuqs. The museum also boasts six exhibition spaces; these occupy the bedrooms built in the early 20th century. One of the rooms will host the planned virtual museum of the necropolis of the kings of Sidon; this exhibition will include high resolution photographs of the collection of royal Sidonian sarcophagi. The 16 sarcophagi were discovered in 1887 in an orchard north-east of the city near the village of Helalieh; they were moved by the Ottomans after their unearthing to the Istanbul Archaeology Museum. The exhibition space includes the library of jurist and law professor François Debbane; it holds more than 2,500 works including 50 rare books. A third room exhibits the history of the Debbane family and the genealogical family tree. The tayyara houses a collection of old films and photographs of the city of Saida.

== Significance ==
According to Davie, the palace is an architecturally distinctive structure that is unique in Lebanon in exhibiting characteristics of both military and domestic architecture, as well as decorative influences from the early Ottoman period. Despite the damage inflicted during the Lebanese Civil War, the residence has remained relatively well preserved. The restrained design of its façades and the simplicity of its exterior forms stand in contrast to the elaborate interior ornamentation. Its spatial organization, the configuration of its openings, and the materials used in its construction further contribute to its architectural significance. Davie further situates the palace within a broader architectural tradition, noting its association with Ottoman-influenced aristocratic residences built by local elites and governors in various cities of the region during the same period. She identifies notable parallels with the Al-Azm, Jabri, and Farhi mansions of Damascus. Additionally, in Mount Lebanon, the principal hall of the serail of Deir el-Qamar exhibits similar decorative elements.

== Gallery ==
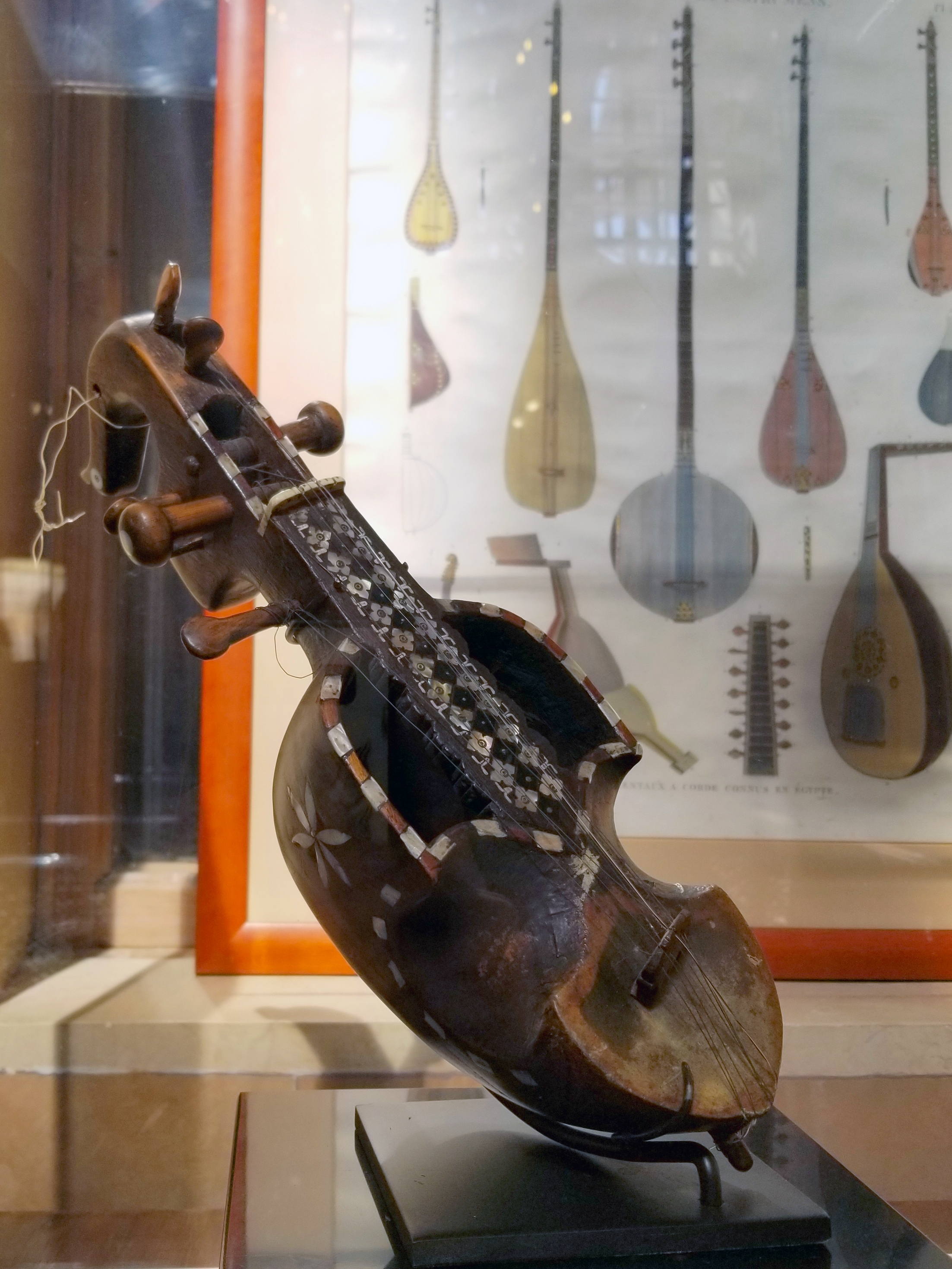
Ottoman-era string musical instrument on display at the museum

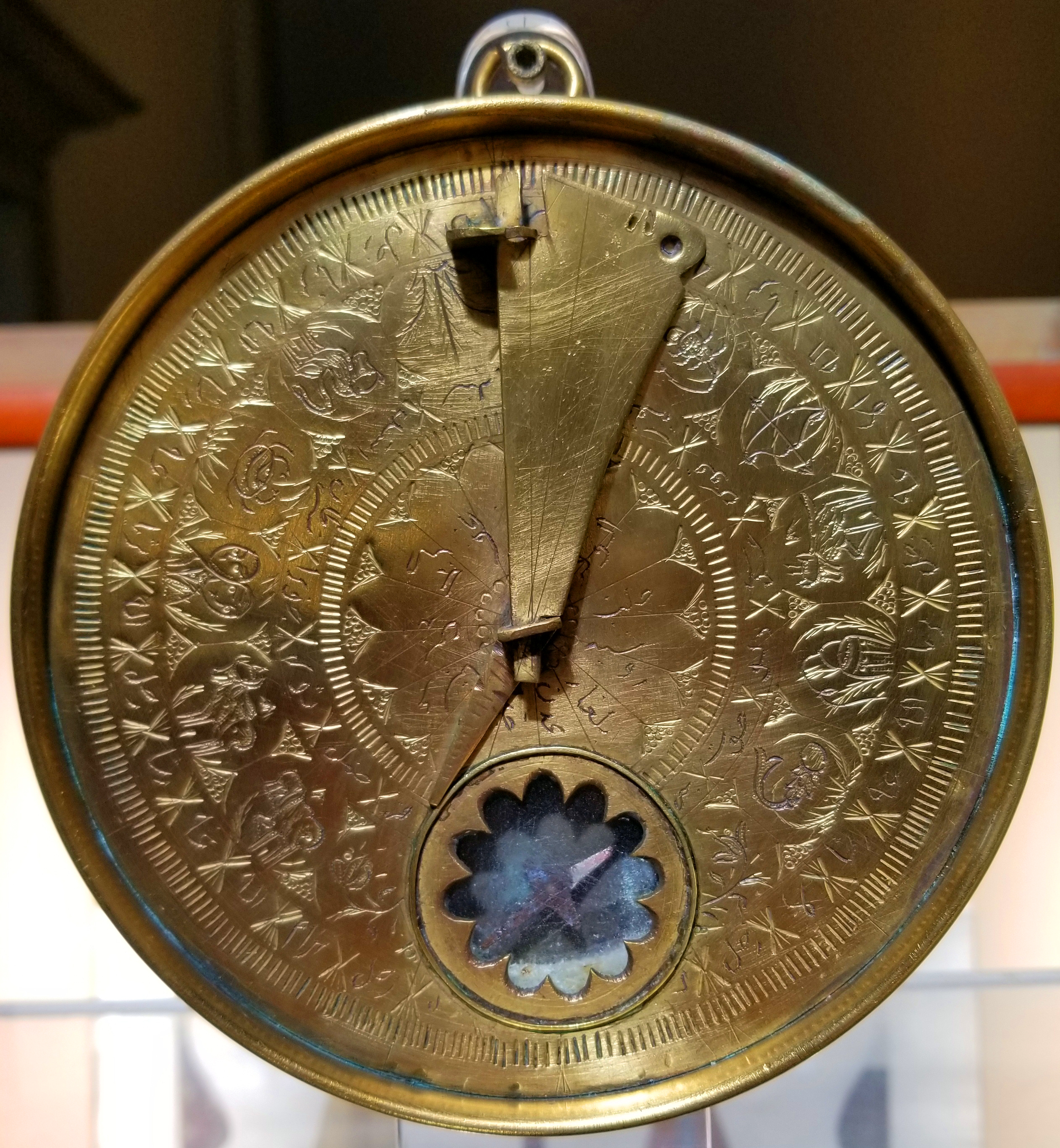
Ottoman-style sundial with folded gnomon and compass. The sundial features engraved toponyms in Arabic and zodiac symbols

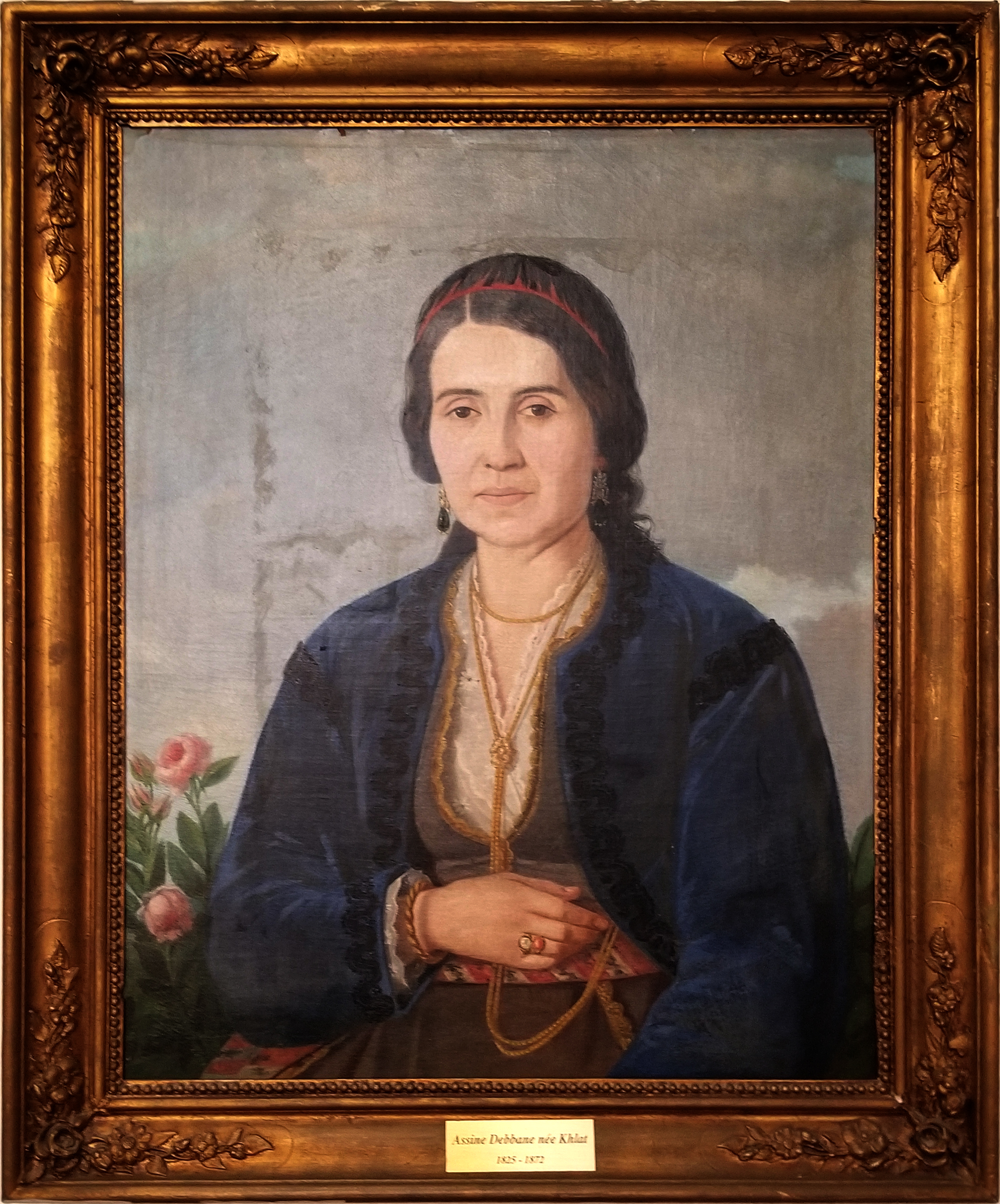
Portrait of Asin Khlat (1825–1872)

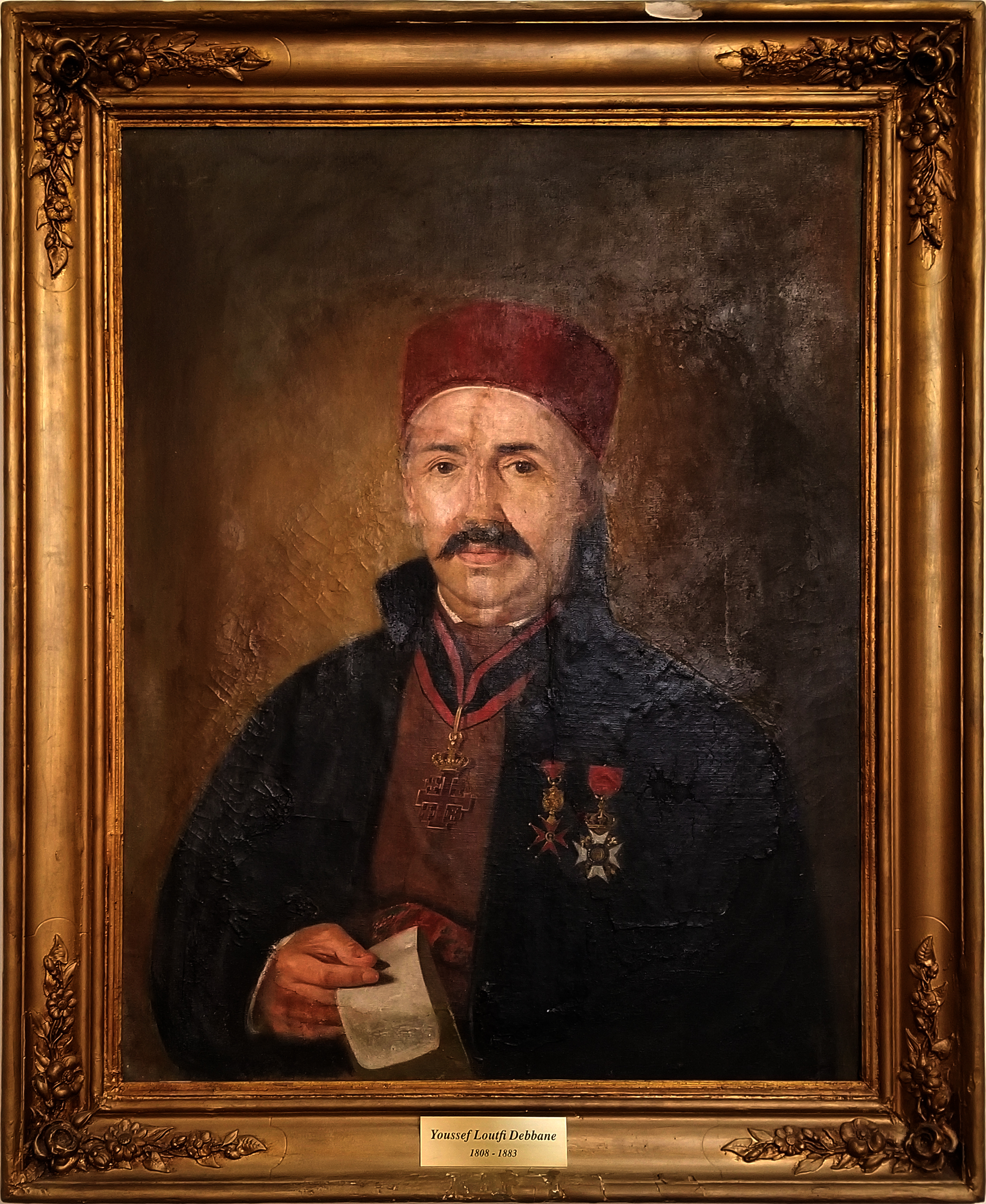
Portrait of Youssef Loutfi Debbane (1808-1883)

== Bibliography ==
- Barnes, John Robert (1987). An Introduction to Religious Foundations in the Ottoman Empire. BRILL. ISBN 9789004086524.
- Bou Assaf, Yasmine Makaroun (2007). "Les apports de l'archéologie du Bâti au diagnostic : le Palais Debbané à Saida (Liban) entre mémoires et quête d'identité" (PDF). Bâti Edificio Building (in French). RehabiMed. Archived from the original (PDF) on 2020-07-17.
- Çizakça, Murat (1996). A Comparative Evolution of Business Partnerships: The Islamic World and Europe, With Specific Reference to the Ottoman Archives. BRILL. ISBN 9789004106017.
- Davie, May (2003). "Le burj Ali : dune tour de garde à un palais damascène turquisant de Saïda du XVIIIe siècle" [The Burj Ali: from a watchtower to an 18th-century Damascene-Turkish palace in Saïda] (PDF). Archeology and History in Lebanon (18): 129–137.
- Debbané Foundation (2001). "The museum chronology". www.museumsaida.org. Archived from the original on 2020-08-06.
- Deguilhem, Randi (2008). Jayyusi, Salma Khadra; Holod, Renata; Petruccioli, Antillio; Raymond, André (eds.). The City in the Islamic World (2 vols). BRILL. ISBN 9789047442653.
- Diaz, Cécilia (2017-06-13). "Le palais Debbané : fleuron de l'architecture arabo-ottomane sidonienne" [The Debbane palace: A flagship of Arabo-Ottoman Sidonian architecture]. AgendaCulturel (in French). Archived from the original on 2019-12-23.
- Farchakh, Joanne (10 July 2001). "Restauration - Trois ans d'étude et une fondation pour la gestion - Le palais Debbané transformé en musée" [Restoration - Three years of study and a management foundation - Debbané Palace transformed into a museum]. L'Orient-Le Jour (in French).
- Ghoussayni, F.; Ali, A.; Bayyati, A. (2018-12-24). "Rehabilitation of historical cities in the mediterranean using modular patterns – case study of Sidon" (PDF). Lebanese Science Journal. 19 (3): 455–476. doi:10.22453/LSJ-019.3.410431. ISSN 1561-3410.
- Harris, Beth; Zucker, Steven (2013). "Qa'a: The Damascus room (video)". Khan Academy. Khan Academy. Archived from the original on 2020-07-16.
- L'Orient le Jour staff (12 January 2004). "Saïda - Bourj Ali : une tour de garde transformée en un palais damascène turquisant Le palais Debbané, un monument unique en son genre au Liban" [Saïda - Bourj Ali: a watchtower transformed into a Turkish Damascene palace The Debbané Palace, a unique monument in Lebanon]. L'Orient-Le Jour (in French).
- Piterberg, Gabriel (1990). "The Formation of an Ottoman Egyptian Elite in the 18th Century". International Journal of Middle East Studies. 22 (3): 275–289. doi:10.1017/S0020743800034073. ISSN 0020-7438. JSTOR 164128.
- Porter, Leila Molana-Allen & Lizzie (2018-05-07). "Did Syria create the world's first song?". www.bbc.com. Archived from the original on 2020-07-16.
- Weber, Stefan (2010). "The Making of an Ottoman Harbour Town: Sidon/Saida from the Sixteenth to the Eighteenth Centuries". In Sluglett, Peter (ed.). Syria and Bilad al-Sham under Ottoman Rule: Essays in honour of Abdul Karim Rafeq. BRILL. ISBN 9789004191044.
- Weber, Stephan (2014). "La fabrique d'une ville portuaire ottomane. Les acteurs du développement urbain de Sidon entre le XVI et le XVIII siècle" [The making of an Ottoman port city. The players in Sidon's urban development between the 16th and 18th centuries]. In Kaiser, Wolfang (ed.). La loge et le fondouk. Les dimensions spatiales des pratiques marchandes en Méditerranée Moyen Age - Epoque moderne [The lodge and the fondouk. The spatial dimensions of merchant practices in the Mediterranean Middle Ages - Modern times] (in French). KARTHALA Editions. ISBN 9782811109837.
