= Martyrs' Monument, Beirut =

Monument

Coordinates: 33.896°N 35.507°E

Martyrs' Monument was built to honor the hanging of a cross-confessional group of Lebanese Arab Patriots on May 6, 1916, who had spoken against Turkish rule by Ottoman General Jamal Pasha. It is located at what is now known as Martyrs' Square in the heart of downtown Beirut, Lebanon. It was created by Italian sculptor Marino Mazzacurati, and inaugurated in 1960.

== History ==
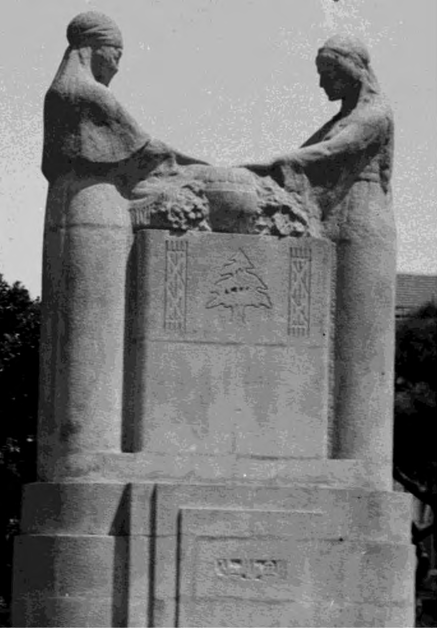
Youssef Hoyek - Martyrs Square statue (1930)

In 1930, during the French Mandate, the first commemorative sculpture was erected on the square in memory of Lebanese nationalists who were hanged during World War I by the order of Ottoman military ruler Djemal Pasha. The original monument (right) by Youssef Hoyek represented two women, a Muslim and a Christian, holding hands in a symbolic gesture over an urn that represented their martyred children' ashes. Hoyek carved on their chests stylized shahada (لا إله إلا الله) and a small cross respectively.

In 1956, President Camille Chamoun laid the foundation stone of a monument. It would have consisted of an arch soaring over an obelisk, but the monument was never completed.

The current four-meter-high statue of the Martyrs that adorns the square was created by Italian artist Marino Mazzacurati and cast at Ahmad & Saeddine Abbas Foundry in the Saifi district. It was inaugurated by President Fouad Chehab in 1960.

Due to damage inflicted during the Civil War (1975-1990), the Martyrs’ monument was dismantled in 1996 and restored by the Holy Spirit University of Kaslik. The restoration intentionally preserved the marks of the war damage.

== Timeline ==
- 1930: First commemorative sculpture was erected on Martyrs' Square in memory of Lebanese nationalists hanged during World War I by the Ottomans.
- 1956: President Camille Chamoun laid foundation stone of monument designed by Sami Abdel Baki which was never completed.
- 1960: President Fouad Chehab inaugurated the new sculpture of the Martyrs' Monument, designed by Marino Mazzacurati.
- 1996: Monument was dismantled and restored by the Holy Spirit University of Kaslik.

== See also ==
- Jamal Pasha
- Youssef Hoyek
- Marino Mazzacurati
- Holy Spirit University of Kaslik
- Lebanese Civil War
