= Martyrs' Square, Beirut =

Historical central public square of Beirut, Lebanon

Coordinates: 33°53′47″N 35°30′26″E

Martyrs' Square (Arabic: ساحة الشهداء Sāḥat ash-Shuhadāʾ), historically known as "Al Burj" or "Place des Cannons", is the historical central public square of Beirut, Lebanon.

Like the Martyr's Square in Damascus, it is named after the 6 May 1916 executions ordered by Djemal Pasha during World War I.

== Overview ==
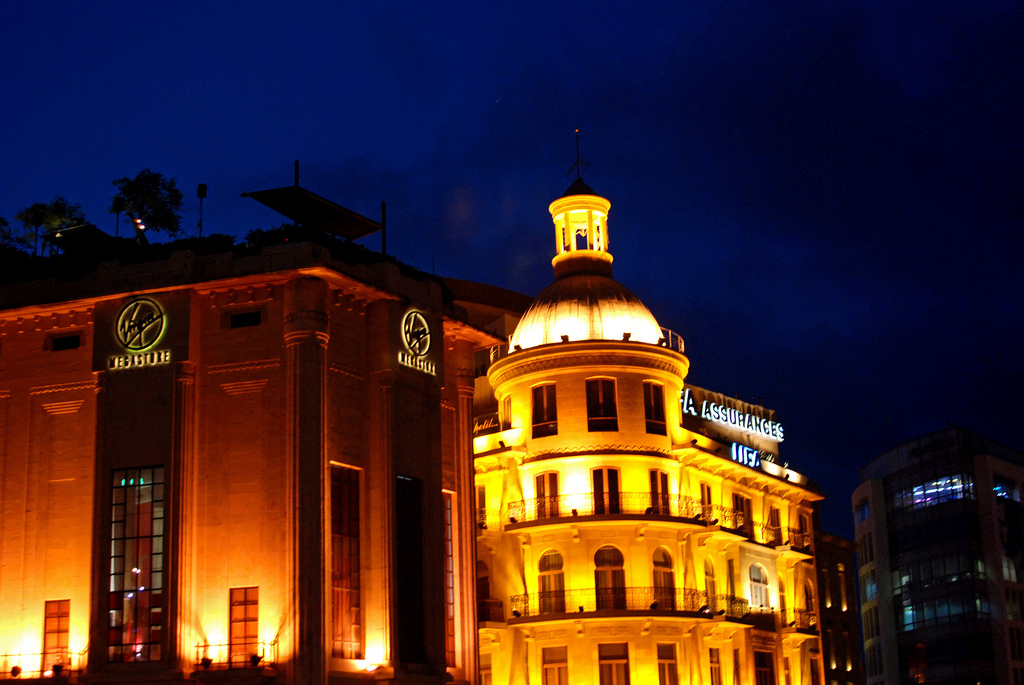
The "Old Opera House" on Martyrs' Square

In 1931, the historic square took its name to commemorate the martyrs executed there under Ottoman rule. In the 1950s, the square became a popular venue for cinemas and coffee-houses. During the Lebanese Civil War, it was part of the demarcation line that divided the city in half.

== Construction ==
Initially named Sahat al-Burj, the Municipality of Beirut modernized the square in 1878 as the main meeting place of the city. Beshara Effendi designed a garden with fountain and kiosks, overlooked by the Petit Serail – the seat of Beirut's governor general – as well as public buildings and souks. After that, the square underwent a lot of transformations until 1931, where it took the name of Martyrs' Square in commemoration of the martyrs executed there under Ottoman rule and a monument was erected. In 1950, the Petit Serail was demolished. The new Rivoli cinema blocked the link between the square and the harbor. Martyrs' Square became Beirut's bus and taxi terminus and a popular venue for cinemas, coffee-houses, modest hotels and the red-light district. During the Civil War (1975–1990), Martyrs' Square formed the demarcation line that divided the city in half. In 2005, an international competition was launched for the design of a new square with its axis open to the sea, reestablishing Martyrs' Square as Beirut's premier public space and heart of the capital.

== History ==
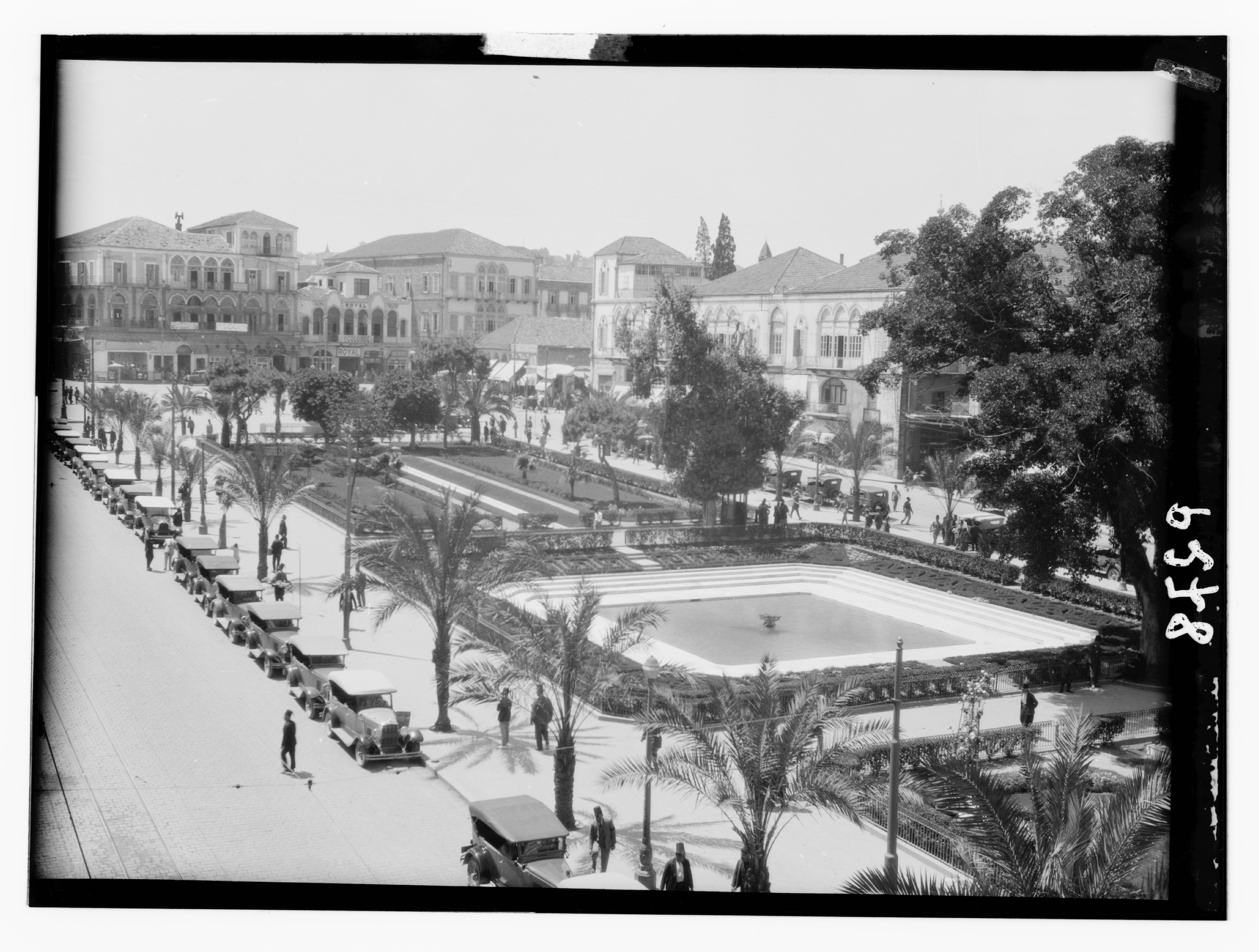
"El Burj" or "Place de Cannon" in the 1930s

Martyrs' Square originated as an open space (maydan) beyond the city wall. The ancient watchtower of Burj al-Kashef marked its outer limit, and gave the square its first and still surviving name, Sahat al-Burj (Tower Square).

In 1773, a Russian cannon placed near the Burj caused the square's name to be changed to 'Place du Canon' (Cannon Square). It became 'Place des Canons' (Cannons Square) in 1860, when the initial Russian cannon was replaced by cannons from the French fleet. Named 'Hamidiyyeh Square' in 1884 to honor Sultan Abdul Hamid II, it became 'Union Square' and then 'Freedom Square' with the advent of the Young Turks revolution of 1908. In 1931, the square took the name it still officially bears today, Martyrs' Square, to commemorate the martyrs executed there under Ottoman rule and the Martyrs' Monument, Beirut was erected.

First enclosed as a formal urban space in the 1860s, the Municipality of Beirut modernized the square in 1878 as the main meeting place of the city. Beshara Effendi designed a garden with fountain and kiosks, overlooked by the Petit Serail – the seat of Beirut's governor general – as well as public buildings and souks. The tramway, built in 1906, placed the square at the center of Beirut's transport network. During the early years of the French Mandate, the Duraffourd and subsequent Danger Plans created the 'Place de l'Etoile' (Etoile Square). They proposed the demolition of the Petit Serail to open Martyrs' Square to the sea, an ambition that was foiled. The square was neglected and Etoile Square became the geographic and administrative center of the capital.

In 1931, it was renamed Martyrs' Square after those executed there on 6 May 1916, in the last years of Ottoman rule. The nationalists were a cross-confessional group that were fighting for Lebanon's autonomy and independence:

- Emir Aref Chehab
- Father Joseph Hayek
- Abdul Karim al-Khalil
- Abdelwahab al-Inglizi
- Joseph Bshara Hani
- Mohammad Mahmassani
- Mahmoud Mahmassani, brother of Mohammad
- Omar Ali Nashashibi
- Omar Hamad
- Philippe El Khazen, journalist from Jounieh, Lebanon
- Farid El Khazen, younger brother of Philippe and also a journalist and editor from Jounieh, Lebanon
- Sheikh Ahmad Tabbara
- Petro Paoli
- Abdel Ghani al-Arayssi, editor of al-Mufid newspaper
- Muhammad Chanti, publisher of ad-difa'a newspaper in Jaffa.
- George Haddad, journalist and poet

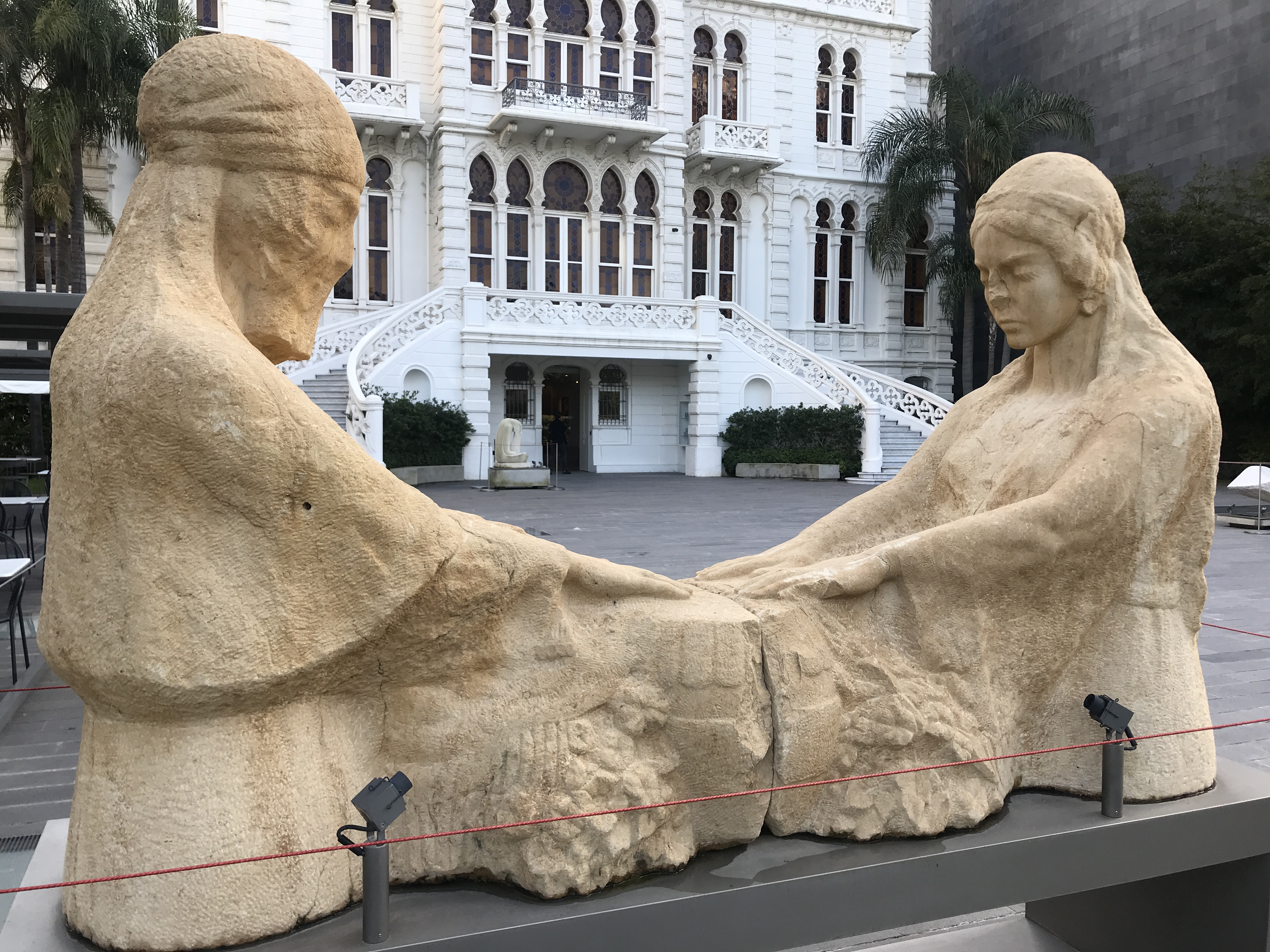
Original martyrs' memorial, Les pleureuses (the weeping women) by Youssef Hoyek (1930)

The first Monument aux Martyrs was commissioned by the French Mandate authorities and unveiled on 19 December 1930, on the twentieth anniversary of the declaration of the state of Greater Lebanon. However, the statue by Youssef Hoyek – which became known as Les Pleureuses or the weeping women – was deeply unpopular after independence for its depiction of grieving Christian and Muslim mothers joining hands over a cremation urn. It was attacked with a hammer in 1948 before being finally removed in 1953, and is now displayed outside the Sursock Museum.

The more triumphant Martyrs' Monument by Marino Mazzacurati was inaugurated in 1960.

In 1950, the Petit Serail was demolished. The new Rivoli cinema blocked the link between the square and the harbor. Martyrs' Square became Beirut's bus and taxi terminus and a popular venue for cinemas, coffee-houses, modest hotels and the red-light district.

During the Lebanese Civil War (1975–1990), the demarcation line that divided Beirut into east and west ran through Martyrs' Square.

In late 2019, Martyrs' Square became a major focal point of the anti-government protests.

== Timeline ==
- 1773: Initially Sahat al-Burj, it became Place du canon, after the Russian cannon that was placed on the square.
- 1860: Renamed Place des canons after the Russian cannon was replaced by cannons from the French fleet.
- 1878: Municipality of Beirut modernized the square as the main meeting place of the city.
- 1884: Named Hamidiyyeh Square in honor of Sultan Abdul Hamid II.
- 1906: The tramway was built and placed the square at the center of Beirut's transport network.
- 1908: Named Freedom Square following the advent of the Young Turks revolution.
- 1931: The square took the name of Martyrs' Square in commemoration of the martyrs executed there under Ottoman rule.
- 1950: The demolition of the Petit Serail, which was earlier proposed during the early years of the French Mandate.
- 1975–1990: Civil war, Martyrs' Square formed the demarcation line that divided the city in half.

== Gallery ==
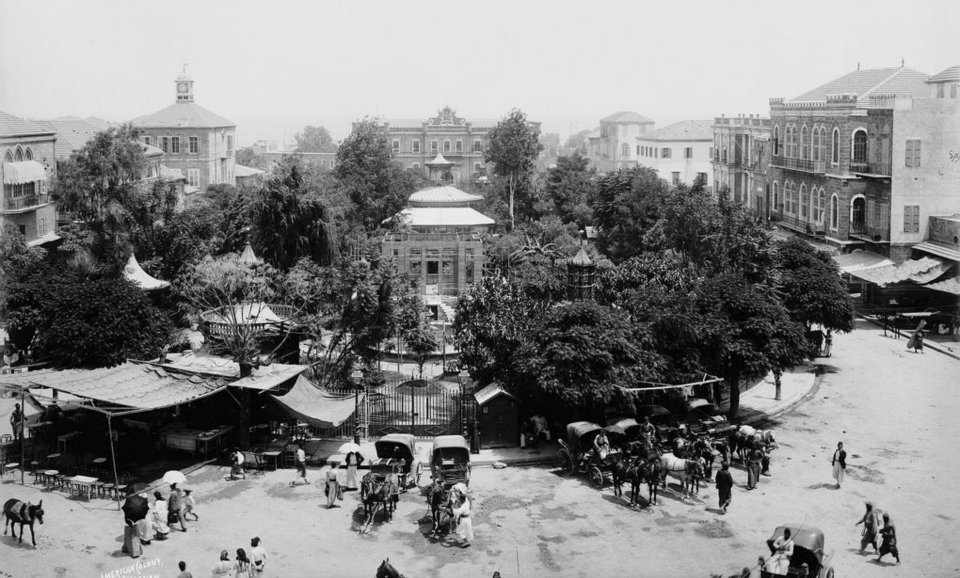
Once known as "Place des Canons"

== See also ==
- Municipality of Beirut

== Sources ==
- Davie, May (2001) Beyrouth 1825–1975. Un siècle et demi d’urbanisme, Ordre des ingénieurs et des architectes, Beyrouth.
- Kassir, Samir (2003) Histoire de Beyrouth, Fayard, Paris. ISBN 2-213-02980-6.
- Sassine Farès et Tuéni, Ghassan (direction) (2003) El-Bourj. Place de la Liberté et Porte du Levant, Editions Dar an-Nahar, Beyrouth.
- Khalaf, Samir (2006). Heart of Beirut: Reclaiming the Bourj. Saqi. ISBN 978-0-86356-542-7.
