= Cinema Opera and Ezzeddine Building =

Coordinates: 33.897174°N 35.507019°E

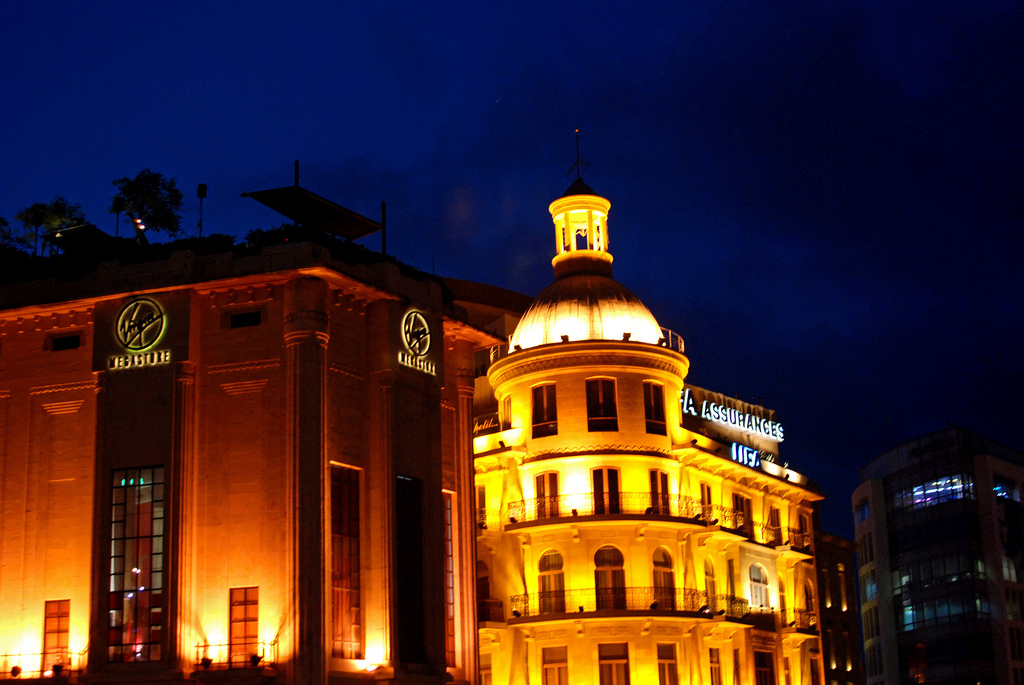
The old "Cinema Opera"

Cinema Opera and Ezzeddine Building is located in Beirut Central District, Lebanon.

== Overview ==
Cinema Opera and Ezzedine building were the only two buildings on Martyrs’ Square to be retained after the Lebanese Civil War (1975 –1990). Due to being heavily pockmarked and gutted from prolonged warfare, the two buildings were part of a long restoration effort and were both fully restored in 2001.

== Construction ==
In 1932, architect Bahjat Abdelnour designed the Cinema Opera building for deputy and businessman Abboud Abdel Razzak. The basement housed Cinema Rio, another popular movie theater operating until 1967. The building displays an eclectic Art Deco style. Restored in 2001, the main features of the building, including the terraced balconies and stage, were retained. The Ezzedine building, adjacent to Cinema Opera, was the only other building on Martyrs’ Square to be retained after the Civil War (1975-1990). Formerly the Royal Hotel, it was restored in 2001 and its original dome was rebuilt, now a Hotel Le Gray.

== History ==
In 1932, architect Bahjat Abdelnour designed the building for deputy and businessman Abboud Abdel Razzak. It derives its name from the Cinema Opera, inaugurated in November 1944 with the showing of the movie ‘The Constant Nymph, starring Charles Boyer and Jean Fonteyn. The basement of the building housed Cinema Rio, another popular movie theater operating until 1967. The building displays the eclectic Art Deco style, manifest in the Neo-Egyptian motifs and round pilasters with capitals in limestone. The walls are decorated with horizontal dentils and successive recesses. The Art Deco style is also present in the geometric patterns of the wrought ironwork. When the building was restored in 2001, its main features, including the terraced balconies and stage, were retained.

The Ezzedine building, next to Cinema Opera, was the only other building on Martyrs’ Square to be retained after the Lebanon Civil War (1975-1990). Formerly the Royal Hotel, it was restored in 2001 and its original dome rebuilt, in the 2010s, the Al Nahar building was built next to it, across Waygand street. The former Cinema Opera is now a Virgin Megastore with the Beirut Gardens condo complex built next to it in the 2010s.

== Timeline ==
1944: Inauguration of the Cinema Opera, designed by Bahjat Abdelnour.

2001: Restoration of the Cinema Opera and Ezzedine Building (formerly the Royal Hotel), the only two buildings on Martyrs’ Square to be retained after the Civil War.

== See also ==
- Art Deco
- Lebanese Civil War
- Martyr's Square
