= Shahba Mall =

Defunct shopping mall in Aleppo, Syria

- شهباء مول

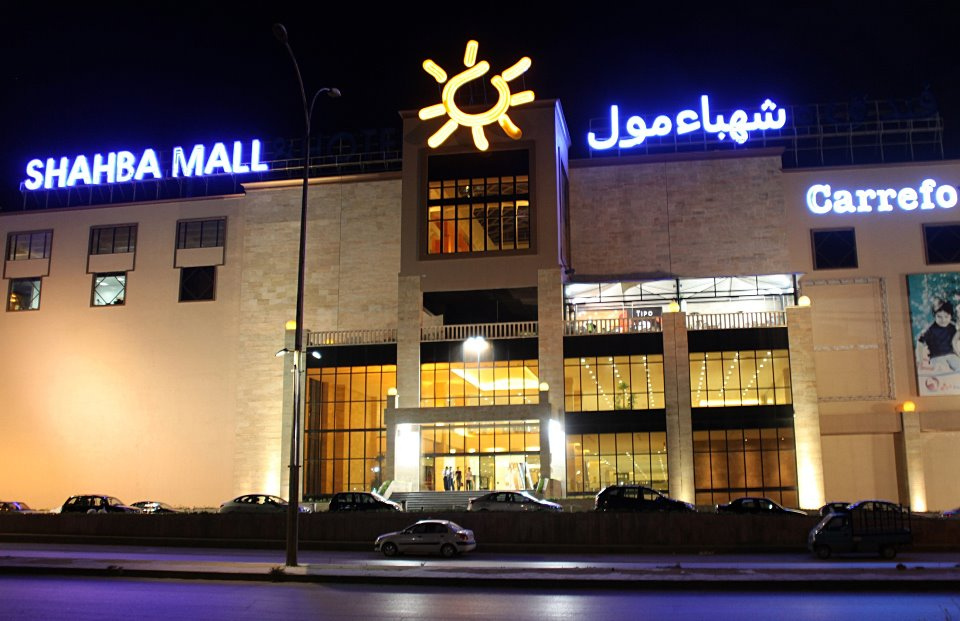
- The main entrance of Shahba Mall in 2012 before its destruction
- Interactive map of the Shahba Mall area

General information
- Status: Destroyed
- Type: Shopping mall, hotel
- Location: Aleppo, Gazi Ayntap Avenue, Kafr Hamrah, Syria
- Coordinates: 36°15′29″N 37°05′45″E
- Opened: 2009; 17 years ago
- Closed: 16 October 2014; 11 years ago
- Destroyed: 16 October 2014; 11 years ago
- Cost: US $ 70 million
- Owner: Syrian Jordanian Company for Tourism and Real Estate Investment (SJC)

Technical details
- Floor count: 7
- Floor area: 125,000 m^{2} (1,350,000 sq ft)

Design and construction
- Structural engineer: Daaboul Industrial Group

Other information
- Number of stores: 350
- Number of rooms: 250

Website
- http://shahbamall.com at the Wayback Machine (archived March 17, 2012)

Shahba Mall (Arabic: شهباء مول) is a defunct shopping mall in Aleppo, Syria, and was the largest shopping mall in Syria prior to its destruction during the Syrian civil war. Located in northern Aleppo, the mall consisted of 125,000-square-metre (1,350,000 sq ft) area of building that consists of fashion stores, boutiques, electronics stores, supermarket, restaurants, cafes, an indoor amusement park, a carting circuit, cinema and a four-star hotel with 250 guestrooms. The main anchors inside this mall were Carrefour and Virgin Megastores.

The mall was permanently closed when the mall was damaged during the Syrian civil war on October 16, 2014.

== History ==
=== Pre-Syrian civil war era ===
Shahba Mall was one of the first project which was developed by Syrian Jordanian Company for Tourism and Real Estate Investment (SJC) and had opened in the final quarter of 2009. This project had included a 4-star hotel with 250 rooms, a seven-storey shopping mall, eight screen cinema, a business center, and 36 restaurants and cafes. The mall was located in northern Aleppo which is close to motorway that links to Gaziantep, Turkey. The construction of this mall had cost around US $ 70 million and was the largest shopping mall in Syria. Both Carrefour and Virgin Megastores were to be anchors inside the mall.

=== Destruction and aftermath ===
The mall was damaged during the Syrian civil war clashes which caused the mall to be permanently closed on October 16, 2014. Syrian activists believed that the bombing of the mall was done by pro-government airforces.

According to a 2015 article in the Guardian, the mall had served as a prison while it was under the control of the Islamic State of Iraq and the Levant.
