= May Fatté Davie =

Lebanese scholar

May Davie
- Born: May Fatté; 1950 (age 75–76)
- Other name: May Fatté Davie
- Occupations: Historian, academic

Academic work
- Discipline: History
- Institutions: University of Balamand

May Davie (also May Fatté Davie; born 1950 in Beirut) is a Lebanese and French historian and scholar specializing in urban history, religious architecture, and socio-political structures in the Middle East. She is a professor at the University of Balamand and serves as the director of the Department of Religious Heritage: Art and Architecture at the university’s Institute of History, Archaeology, and Near Eastern Studies (IOHANES). She also serves as the director of the ARPOA (Architecture Religieuse du Patriarcat Orthodoxe d'Antioche) laboratory at the University of Balamand in Lebanon.

== Education ==
Davie earned her Bachelor of Economics from Université Saint-Joseph in Beirut in 1973, followed by a Master’s in History from the same institution in 1987. She completed her Doctorate in History at Université de Paris IV-Sorbonne in 1993 under the supervision of Dominique Chevallier. During her doctoral studies, she also pursued advanced training at Université d’Aix-en-Provence in 1991.

== Career ==
Davie began her career as a lecturer in economics at the University of Constantine, Algeria (1976–1978), teaching microeconomics, macroeconomics, and accounting. In 1993, she joined Université Saint-Joseph in Beirut as a lecturer in urban history. Since 1992, Davie has been a professor at the Urbanism Institute of the Lebanese Academy of Fine Arts (ALBA) in Beirut. She has also held positions as an associate researcher at URBAMA at the Université de Tours in France from 1992 to 2001 and at the Centre d'Études et de Recherches sur le Moyen-Orient Contemporain in Beirut from 1996 to 1997. In 1998, she became the director of the journal Chronos at the University of Balamand. Since 2004, she has led the Religious architecture of the Orthodox Patriarchate of Antioch laboratory at the same university. Her association with Centre Tourangeau d'Histoire et d'études des Sources (CeTHiS) at the University of Tours began in 2011.

Davie's research primarily focuses on Lebanese national identity and heritage, and the management of religious spaces in Beirut. She has been involved in various projects, such as studying the religious heritage of Tripoli, Lebanon, and examining the transformation of places of worship and urban recomposition in Beirut from the 19th century until the establishment of the Lebanese Republic.

== Publications ==
Davie has authored several works, including:

- Beyrouth et ses faubourgs, 1840–1940, une intégration inachevée (1996): This book examines the incomplete integration of Beirut and its suburbs during the specified period.
- Atlas historique des grecs-orthodoxes de Beyrouth et du Mont-Liban 1800–1940 (1999): An historical atlas detailing the Greek Orthodox communities in Beirut and Mount Lebanon.
- Beyrouth 1825–1975, un siècle et demi d’urbanisme (2001): A comprehensive study of a century and a half of urban planning in Beirut.
- Églises et chapelles orthodoxes du Qornet ar-Roum (pays de Jbeil, Liban): A study on the religious architecture of Orthodox churches and chapels in the Qornet ar-Roum region of Lebanon.
