= Abdul Hamid al-Zahrawi =

Syrian Arab nationalist (1855-1916)

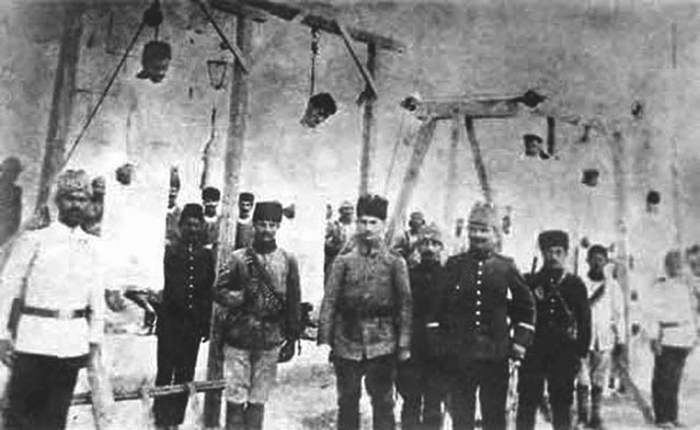
The 6 May 1916 executions at Damascus

Abdul Hamid al-Zahrawi (Arabic: عبد الحميد الزهراوي; 1855 – 6 May 1916) was a Syrian Arab nationalist and former member of the General Assembly of the Ottoman Empire. A journalist with the Arab newspaper Al Qabas he supported the Committee of Union and Progress (CUP), a Young Turks movement that carried out a successful coup in 1908. Zahrawi sat for the CUP in parliament but turned against them when they started replacing Arab officials with Turks and was replaced in a rigged election in 1912.

Zahrawi argued against the Ottoman entry into the First World War in 1914 and when this was unsuccessful urged Syrians not to support the war effort. He joined the Arab resistance movement Al-Fatat in 1915. That same year the Ottoman governor of Syria Djemal Pasha planned to have Zahrawi arrested and in 1916 Zahrawi was tried on charges of high treason. Despite pleas for clemency from Ottoman leaders Talaat Pasha and Enver Pasha Zahrawi was executed alongside other Arab nationalists at Damascus on 6 May 1916. The date is commemorated in Lebanon and Syria as Martyrs' Day.

== Biography ==
Zahrawi was born in Homs in the Syria province of the Ottoman Empire in 1855. He attended the Ottoman Law Academy in Istanbul and afterwards wrote for Arab newspapers in Damascus, particularly Al Qabas. Zahrawi supported the Committee of Union and Progress (CUP), a group of the Young Turks movement that carried out a successful coup in 1908, introducing democratic reforms and curbing the power of the sultan.

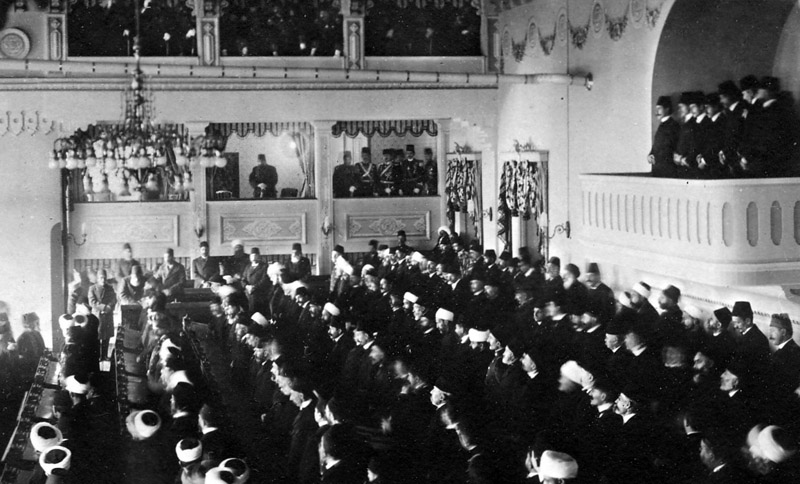
The General Assembly, 1908

Zahrawi was elected to the newly re-established General Assembly of the Ottoman Empire in 1908, representing the CUP. The CUP began replacing Arab officials with Turkish ones and Zahrawi turned against them. With fellow deputies Shafiq Mu'ayyad al-Azm and Shukri al-Asali he led the opposition to the CUP in parliament. The CUP called new elections in 1912 which it rigged to remove the three Arab deputies from parliament.

In 1913, Zahrawi joined a group of Arab activists to form the first all-Arab congress in Paris, intended to unite Arabs against the Ottomans. He chaired the conference and appointed Jamil Mardam Bey, a Syrian student in France, as director of public relations. Around this time Ottoman general Mahmut Nedim Hendek, a leading Young Turk, cautioned Zahrawi not to agitate too much for reform. Hendek noted the need for reform in the governance of the Arab provinces but warned Zahrawi that moving too quickly would lead to resistance from the Ottoman government. Zahrawi stated that he had waited long enough and had lost patience waiting for reform.

After the First World War began in 1914 Zahrawi unsuccessfully tried to persuade Sultan Mehmed V to stay out of the conflict. Once the war was joined he argued for Syrian subjects to not get involved. In 1915 Zahrawi joined the Arab resistance movement Al-Fatat.

The Ottoman governor of Syria Djemal Pasha wrote to de facto Ottoman leader Talaat Pasha in May 1915 noting that he intended on having Zahrawi killed. He asked Talaat to order Zahrawi from Istanbul to Syria to allow Djemal to arrange his death but Talaat feared the killing would spark an Arab uprising. Eventually Talaat relented, Zahrawi was sent and arrested by Djemal. Zahrawi was tried for high treason by a military tribunal at Aley in Lebanon. He was convicted and sentenced to death. Talaat and Enver Pasha asked Djemal to grant clemency on the sentence, but he did not relent.

Zahrawi's sentence was carried out in a public hanging in Marjeh Square, Damascus, on 6 May 1916. He was among seven men hanged at Damascus that day, including Asali, and fourteen at Beirut. Zahrawi afterwards became a cult figure to the Arabs and an inspiration for the participants of the Arab Revolt. In Lebanon and Syria 6 May is commemorated as Martyrs' Day. A secondary school in Syria was also named after Zahrawi.
