= Najib El-Rayyes =

Syrian political journalist (1898–1952)

Najib Mahmoud Al-Rayyes (1898–1952) was a Syrian political journalist, publisher, and intellectual.

== Early life and education ==
Al-Rayyes was born in 1898 in the Syrian city of Hama, and received his primary education there in private schools. He then moved to the city of Homs with his father, who was appointed chief of the city’s police, where he continued his studies in Arabic language and religion.

== Career ==
=== Journalism ===
Al-Rayyes went to Damascus in 1919 and worked in the Syrian press. After that, he wrote for a number of Lebanese newspapers, including Al-Ahrar and Al-Nahar. In 1928, he founded Al-Qabas newspaper, which supported Arab nationalism and Syrian independence. In 1953, Al-Qabas merged with Azza Hosari's newspaper Al-Alam, which was also based in Damascus, following a decree by Syrian President Adib Al-Shishakli to this effect. The first issue was published in 1954 under the name Al-Qabas Al-Alam, but it soon returned to being published independently.

== Nationalist activities ==
In addition to his journalism career, Najib al-Rayyes was also a prominent nationalist who opposed French colonialism in Syria. As a result of his views, French authorities often disrupted the publication of Al-Qabas, and imprisoned and exiled al-Rayyes. During a period of exile on the Syrian island of Arwad in 1922, he wrote a nationalist anthem, "Oh, the Darkness of the Prison."

From 1920-43, al-Rayyes spent a total of eight years in prison, many years in exile. In 1943, he was elected as a representative for Damascus on the list of President Shukri al-Quwatli for four years.

== Publications ==
Al-Rayyes' first book, Nidal, was published in 1934 by Al-Qabas Press in Damascus. It collected a number of his articles that dealt with important events in Syria during that period, and his nationalist political positions in defense of Syria's independence and unity. His second book, Jarrah, was published a few months after his death in 1952 and reprinted without revisions. The articles in this book narrate events in Syria between 1935-45, "when Syrian political life was tumultuous and full of revolutions and struggles against colonialism and demands for the country's unity and independence."

In 1994, a book was published about Najib al-Rayyes, titled Al-Qabas Al-Ma’di’ and published by Dar Al-Rayyis.

== Family ==
Najib al-Rayyes was the father of journalist and publisher Riyad al-Rayyes (1937-2020).
