= Riyad al-Rayyes =

Syrian-Lebanese author and journalist (1937–2020)

Riyad Najib al-Rayyes (Arabic: رياض نجيب الريس (1937 – 26 September 2020) was a Syrian journalist, writer and publisher, born in Damascus.

== Early life ==
Al-Rayyes was born in Damascus, Syria in 1937, he was the son of Najib El-Rayyes, a Syrian political journalist and intellectual who owned the Syrian newspaper Al-Qabas, and his mother Rasima Samina was from Tripoli, Lebanon.

He attended high school in Brummana, Lebanon and received a degree in economics from the University of London.

== Career ==
Al-Rayyes began his career as a journalist, reporting on the Vietnam War in 1966 for An-Nahar and Al-Hayat newspapers, the North Yemen Civil War, the military coup in Greece in 1967, and the Turkish invasion of Cyprus. He was also said to be the first Arab journalist to report on the Prague Spring and the Soviet-led invasion of Czechoslovakia.

In 1977, al-Rayyes moved to London, where he founded Al Manar newspaper, the first Arab newspaper to be published in Europe. From 1979 to 1988, al-Rayyes wrote for the Paris-based Al Mustaqbal magazine.

In addition to his newspaper reporting, al-Rayyes also wrote several dozen books, the best-known of which are his "Winds of Change" series. He also wrote Guerrillas for Palestine. In 1986, al-Rayyes founded a publishing house in London, named Al-Rayyes Books and Publishing. Upon the end of the Lebanese Civil War, he relocated it to Beirut. It published works by Arab authors including Mahmoud Darwish, Fawwaz Traboulsi, and May Menassa.

Al-Rayyes died in Beirut in 2020 from COVID-19, at the age of 83.

== Selected works ==
- The Arabian Gulf and the Winds of Change
- The Winds of the South
- The East Winds
- Journalist and Two Cities
- Before the Colors Faded
- Journalism for a Third of a Century
- Qur’ans and Swords
- The Winds of the North
- The Oases and Oil Conflict: Arab Gulf Concerns
- The Critical Period
- The Land of the Little Dragon: A Journey to Vietnam
- The Death of Others
- Spies Among the Arabs
