= Shukri al-Asali =

Syrian nationalist politician

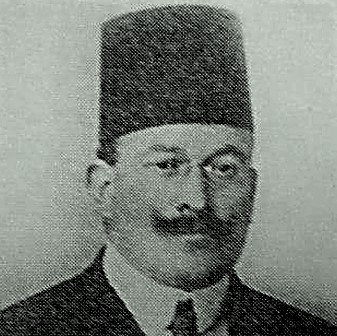
- Shukri al-Asali before his public execution on May 6, 1916
- Born: 1868; Damascus, Ottoman Syria
- Died: May 6, 1916 (aged 47–48); Marjeh Square, Damascus, Ottoman Syria
- Occupation: Parliamentarian
- Known for: Syrian nationalist

Shukri al-Asali (Arabic: شكري العسلي, romanized: Shukrī al-ʿAsalī; 1868 – May 6, 1916) was a prominent Syrian politician, nationalist leader, and senior inspector in the Ottoman government, in addition to being a ranking member of the Council of Notables. He served in the Ottoman parliament from 1911 until April 1912. He was executed with other Syrian nationalists by the Ottoman governor Jamal Pasha.

== Early life ==
Shukri was born in Damascus in 1868 and belonged to the wealthy, landowning al-Asali family. The Al-Asalis originated from the village of Yalda in the outskirts of Damascus, known as the Al-Charkatli family. They relocated to Damascus in the year 1063 AH (Islamic calendar), and they still have endowments in Yalda. In Shukri's time, the family was in the al-Midan quarter of Damascus. Shukri's father Ali Agha (died 1930) and grandfather Muhammad Agha (died 1873) were both landowners who served on the provincial council of Syria Vilayet (Ottoman province of Syria) and in the municipal council of Damascus. Shukri studied at the Syrian Protestant College in Beirut. In 1896, he enrolled into the Ottoman Law Academy in Istanbul, the Ottoman capital. He graduated in 1902 and began his service in the provincial bureaucracy of Syria.

== Political career ==
=== Qaimaqam of Nazareth ===
Al-Asali's career in government started with his appointment as the qaimaqam (district governor) of Nazareth in 1910. During his term, he attempted but failed to prevent the sale of the village lands of al-Fula and Afula, amounting to 2,500 acres, by Elias Sursuq to a Zionist activist (see Sursock Purchase). The large land sale raised ire not only in Palestine, but also in Damascus and Beirut, because of the high quality of the land and the Saladin-era fortress located within it.

=== Member of Parliament ===
Al-Asali resigned as qaimaqam to contest a seat in the Ottoman Parliament during a by-election precipitated by the death of Damascene parliamentarian Muhammad Ajlani. The constitution and parliament had been suspended by Sultan Abdul Hamid II in 1877 but was reinstated by the Committee of Union and Progress (CUP) which seized power in 1908; this permitted political activists such as al-Asali an opportunity to express their grievances and nationalist views. As a deputy in parliament al-Asali was “a forceful advocate of Arab rights and came to lead the Syrian ‘liberal opposition’ in Parliament”, according to historian Philip S. Khoury.

He condemned the alleged reticence of the CUP to appoint Arabs to high-ranking administrative posts; no government ministers or provincial governors were Arabs and fifteen percent of high-ranking bureaucratic posts were filled by Arabs. He raised this matter backed by the aforementioned statistics in a parliamentary debate on 5 April 1911 and was lauded for it by activists in Damascus and Beirut and the Syrian community in Cairo. The Syrian intellectual Abd al-Rahman Shahbandar stated that al-Asali had done away with the image of meek Arab parliamentarians who simply stood by state policies without a voice of their own. The speech had no practical effect in changing policy. However, it was significant because it meant that Arab grievances could no longer be simply overlooked by the government. In contrast, the Turkish press condemned al-Asali for “perfidy” and “hypocrisy”, to which al-Asali responded by asserting his loyalty to the Ottoman state and sultan while reaffirming his position that Arabs were being underrepresented.

Al-Asali also used his platform to criticize the CUP's perceived weakness in confronting Zionist expansion in Palestine. According to historian Louis Fishman, on the latter subject, al-Asali “was in some senses the most effective speaker, focusing concretely on how Zionists were able to achieve dominance”. Al-Asali asserted that Jews moving to Palestine were adopting Ottoman citizenship whilst maintaining the citizenship of their countries of origin which proved useful in case of legal troubles. Moreover, he stressed that the growing Jewish community in Palestine was totally autonomous of the Ottoman state, possessed a growing arsenal of firearms and were in the process of slowly gaining control of rural villages, particularly in the subdistricts of Safad, Tiberias, Jaffa and Jerusalem.

In August and December 1911, al-Asali renewed his criticism of the CUP, accusing it of wearing the foundations of the empire through its autocratic governance and dismissiveness towards non-Turks. He further accused the CUP of brutality in its suppression of popular disturbances in the Hauran and al-Karak and for failing to prevent the Italian invasion of Libya. He later called for some of its leaders and the pro-CUP ex-prime minister Hakki Pasha to face trial for allegedly neglecting their duties to protect Tripolitania province.

Al-Asali's parliamentary activism effectively galvanized Syrian-Arab opposition to the CUP. Parliament was dissolved in early 1912. He subsequently lost in the parliamentary elections of April 1912. Al-Asali's defeat was attributed to his disloyalty to the CUP, which was accused of vote rigging.

=== Later political activism ===
In March 1913, al-Asali turned down an offer to serve as mutesarrif (district governor) of Latakia by Hazim Bey, the governor of Beirut Vilayet. According to historian Sami Moubayed, this was an attempt by the CUP to persuade al-Asali to tone down his criticism of the CUP's policies. Al-Asali stated that he sought reform not a post given to him by a government that opposed such reform.

Al-Asali had become an early member of the secretive Arab Renaissance Society, founded prior to the CUP coup. Following the coup, it evolved into an open forum for political and cultural expression. Following his defeat, al-Asali founded and became the editor of the ardently Arabist Al Qabas newspaper which first appeared in 1913 and called for greater autonomy for the Arabic-speaking provinces of the empire.

Though al-Asali supported the CUP's secular and modernist reforms of Ottoman society, he opposed their vision of a Turkish-centric culture to be enforced upon the whole empire. Instead, al-Asali advocated that the citizens of the non-Turkish provinces, such as Syria, reserved the right to culturally express themselves on their own terms and in their native language.

== Death ==
Though al-Asali had attempted to cooperate with the CUP to assist Syria's inhabitants amid their struggles with food insecurity and famine during World War I, he was nonetheless arrested on allegations of cooperating with agents of the Triple Entente, enemies of the empire. The governor of Syria at the time, Jamal Pasha, stated his wish that al-Asali and other notables arrested “would one day repent”, he allowed the Damascus military tribunal to continue their proceeding despite the absence of any evidence. The tribunal condemned al-Asali to death “for establishing a connection to the French consulate” and joining Arabist organizations prior to World War I.

The powerful Ottoman general Enver Pasha and the Druze notable Shakib Arslan requested that Jamal Pasha pardon al-Asali, but to no avail. Al-Asali was hanged on May 6, 1916 alongside a number of other Syrian nationalist leaders in Damascus and Beirut. His nephew, Sabri al-Asali, later became a three-time prime minister of a post-independent Syria during the 1950s.

== Bibliography ==
- Bawardi, Hani J. (2015). The Making of Arab Americans: From Syrian Nationalism to U.S. Citizenship (1st ed.). Texas: University of Texas Press. ISBN 978-1-47730-752-6.
- Commins, David Dean (1990). Islamic Reform: Politics and Social Change in Late Ottoman Syria. New York and Oxford: Oxford University Press. ISBN 0-19-506103-9.
- Fishman, Louis (2011). "Understanding the 1911 Parliament Debate on Zionism in Light of the Emergence of the Jewish Question". In Ben-Bassat, Yuval; Ginio, Eyal (eds.). Late Ottoman Palestine: The Period of Young Turk Rule. I. B. Tauris. ISBN 978-1-84885-631-8.
- Gingeras, Ryan (2016). Fall of the Sultanate: The Great War and the End of the Ottoman Empire 1908-1922. Oxford: Oxford University Press. ISBN 978-0-19-967607-1.
- Khoury, Philip S. (1983). Urban Notables and Arab Nationalism: The Politics of Damascus 1860-1920. Cambridge: Cambridge University Press. ISBN 0-521-24796-9.
- Moubayed, Sami (2006). Steel & silk : Men and Women Who Shaped Syria 1900-2000 (1st ed.). Seattle: Cune. ISBN 978-1-88594-240-1.
- Roded, Ruth (November 1983). "Ottoman Service as a Vehicle for the Rise of New Upstarts among the Urban Elite Families of Syria in the Last Decades of Ottoman Rule". Asian and African Studies. 17 (1–3). Haifa: Institute of Middle Eastern Studies: 63–94. ISSN 0066-8281.
- Seikaly, Samir (1991). "Shukri al-Asali: A Case Study of a Political Activist". In Khalidi, Rashid (ed.). The Origins of Arab Nationalism. New York: Columbia University Press. pp. 73–96. ISBN 0-231-07434-4.
- Sulaiman, Khalid A. (1984). Palestine and Modern Arab Poetry. London: Zed Books. ISBN 0-86232-238-3.
