= Abdul Hakim Murad (Arab nationalist) =

Palestinian Arab lawyer, poet, writer, and nationalist thinker (1910–1982)

- عبد الحكيم مراد
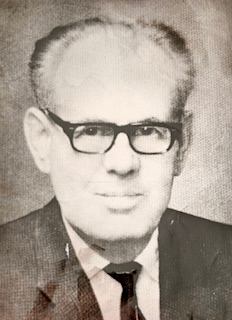
- Abdul Hakim Murad in the late 1960s
- Born: 1910; Hasbaya, Lebanon
- Died: 17 November 1982 (aged 71–72); Beirut, Lebanon
- Occupations: Lawyer, poet, writer, Arab nationalist thinker

Abdul Hakim Murad (Arabic: عبد الحكيم مراد) (1910–1982) was a Palestinian-Syrian lawyer, poet, writer, and political activist, regarded as one of the early Arab nationalist thinkers. Active in Lebanon, Syria, Palestine, Jordan, and Kuwait, he played a key role in Arab nationalist movements, including the founding of al-Ḥaraka al-Yaʿrubiyya (the Arabist Movement), and made significant contributions to modern Arab political thought and literature. He also advocated for women’s liberation and broader social reform, shaping political and intellectual discourse in the Arab world during the mid-20th century.

== Early life and education ==
Murad was born in Hasbaya, Lebanon, in 1910, to a family originally from Gaza. His father, Muhammad Saʿid Murad al-ʿAwadhi al-Ḥusayni al-Ghāzī, was a jurist who studied at Al-Azhar in Cairo and later served as a professor of civil law in Beirut.

In December 1918, he signed the Memorandum of Protest of the Exiled Palestinians to the Peace Conference and the British Foreign Office on Zionism and the Situation in Palestine. The petition, endorsed by exiled Muslim and Christian Palestinians, rejected Zionist claims in Palestine and appealed to the Allies for justice. The document is preserved in Wathāʾiq al-Qadiyya al-Filasṭīniyya (Documents of the Palestinian Question), vol. 1, compiled by Nāhiḍ Zuqūt (2003).

He later represented Gaza in the Syrian Arab Congress (1919–1920), where he supported women’s suffrage. He also served as a judge in the Ottoman Empire in Yemen, Tripoli (Libya), Beersheba, Hasbaya, and Jenin, and wrote a legal commentary al-Adillah al-Aṣliyya al-Uṣūliyya, Sharḥ Majallat al-Aḥkām al-ʿAdliyya (1919–1921).

Murad received his early education in Jenin, Beirut, and Damascus. He studied at Maktab ʿAnbar in Damascus (1921–1923), completed preparatory studies in 1930, and earned a law degree from the Syrian University (now Damascus University) in 1934. He also attended the American University of Beirut (AUB), where he participated in student nationalist societies.

== Political activism ==
Murad became active in Arab nationalist politics during his student years. In Damascus, he co-founded Jamʿiyyat Shabab al-Wihda al-Arabiyya (Youth of Arab Unity) in 1931 and served as its secretary-general until 1934. While studying at the American University of Beirut (AUB), he joined literary and cultural associations alongside figures such as Ibrahim Tuqan and Suleiman al-Nabulsi.

In 1936, Murad joined the Syrian Social Nationalist Party (SSNP), where he held positions such as Interior Commissioner, propaganda head, and deputy leader. He later left the party criticizing what he considered its limited Arab orientation.

In 1941, he founded al-Haraka al-Yaʿrubiyya (The Arabist Movement) (الحركة اليعربية), which advocated Arab unity on philosophical, cultural, and scientific foundations. By 1943, the movement had branches in Lebanon, Jordan, Palestine, and Iraq. Murad also took part in anti-colonial resistance in Damascus, where receiving arms training and addressing popular gatherings.

== Career ==
Murad pursued parallel careers in law, journalism, teaching, and consultancy.

In journalism, he contributed to newspapers including al-Jamiʿa al-Islamiyya, al-Difaʿ, Filastin, al-Sirat al-Mustaqim, al-Shaʿb, al-Adib, al-Hadara, among others. He served as editor-in-chief of al-Shaʿb in Damascus (1932–1933) and co-founded Akhbar al-Mujtamaʿ wa-l-Tullab in 1949.

In law, he practiced in Gaza, Jaffa, Damascus, Beirut, before moving to Kuwait, where he served as a legal consultant to the Kuwaiti National Assembly between 1969 and 1980.

Between 1949 and 1959, Murad taught English at Berlitz schools. He also produced legal radio programs while in Kuwait.

== Works ==
Murad wrote poetry, unpublished manuscripts, plays, philosophical studies, and translations. His early poems appeared in al-Qabas newspaper in 1930.

Unpublished manuscripts

Mabādiʾ al-Ḥaraka al-Yaʿrubiyya (مبادئ الحركة اليعربية, Principles of the Arabist Movement, 1941–1945) — unpublished manuscript

al-Ghayriyya fī al-Taḥarruk al-Yaʿrubī (الغيرية في التحرك اليعربي, Otherness in the Arabist Movement, 1948) — unpublished manuscript

Published works

- al-Fidāʾ (أرض الفداء, The Land of Redemption, 1972), a poetry collection on Palestine, banned in several Arab countries due to its sympathetic references to Christianity.
- Jabr al-Qimah (جبر القيمة, The Algebra of Value, a critique of dialectical materialism.
- Al-Yaʿrubiyya wa-l-Marʾa (اليعربية والمرأة, The Arabist Movement and Women, 1949) — letter written by Abdul Hakim Murad to the Women’s International Conference in Beirut, published in Majallat Akhbār al-Mujtamaʿ wa-l-Tullāb, pp. 3–5, 27–29.

Other works

- Plays, including Muʾtamar Munich
- Translations: Rabindranath Tagore’s Sādhanā and Alfred Adler’s The Meaning of Life

== Personal life ==
Murad was married and had three children. Over the course of his career, he lived in Lebanon, Syria, Palestine, and Kuwait.

== Death ==
He died in Beirut on 17 November 1982, shortly after the Israeli invasion and occupation of the city.
