= Yusuf al-Hani =

Beiruti hanged by Ottomans for treason, 1916

Yusuf al-Hani (also anglicised as Joseph Hani; died 5 April 1916) was a Lebanese Maronite Arab resident of Beirut hanged by the Ottoman Empire for communicating with French diplomat François Georges-Picot in 1913.

== Biography ==
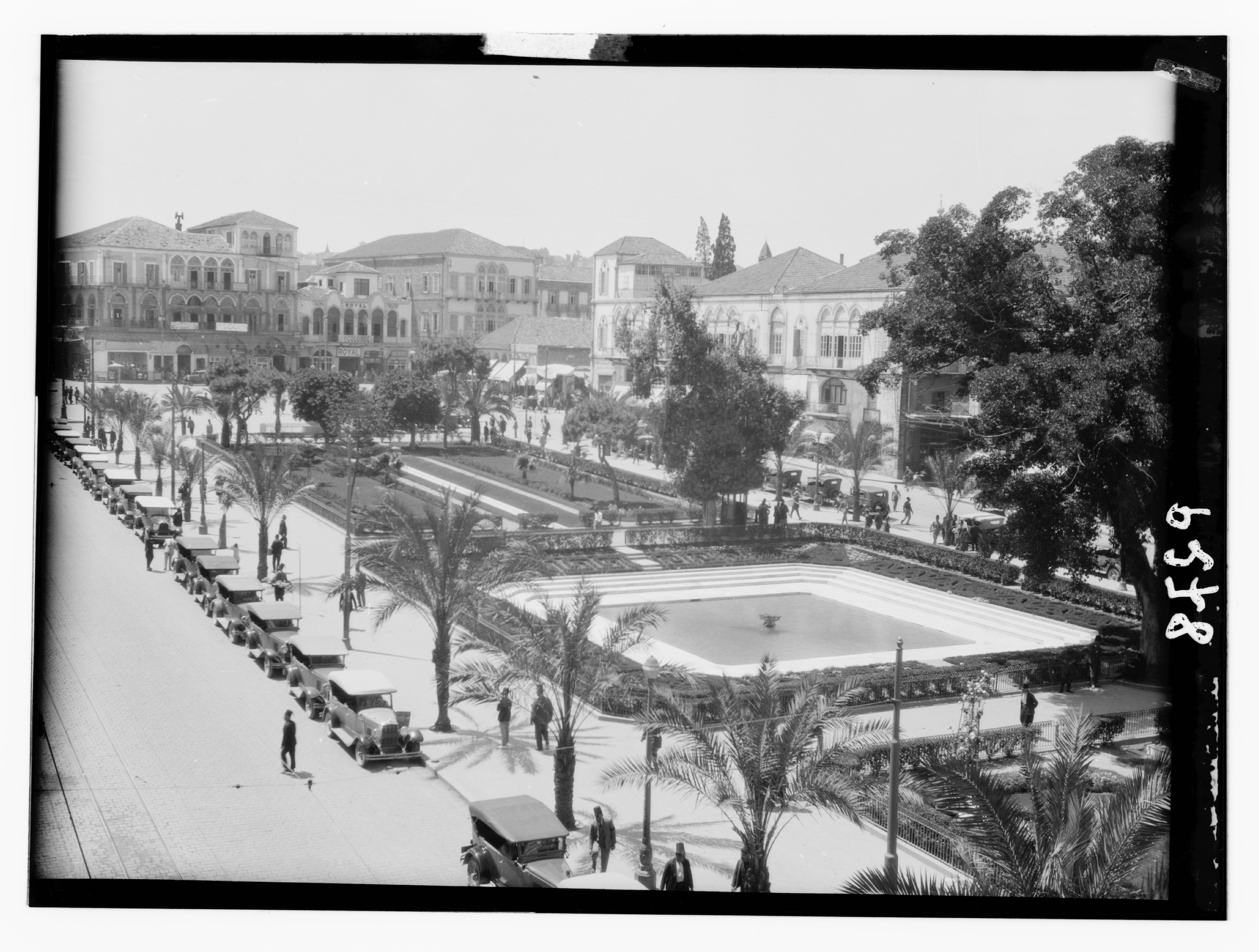
The Burj in the early 20th century

Al-Hani was a Christian Maronite Arab and resident of Beirut, in modern Lebanon. In March 1913 he was one of six men who had signed a letter to the French consul in Beirut, François Georges-Picot, requesting French assistance to liberate Syria and Lebanon from the rule of the Ottoman Empire. The outbreak of the First World War in 1914, in which the Ottoman Empire declared war on France and the other Allies, led to the evacuation of the French consulate in Beirut. Picot was advised by the American consul, Stanley Hollis, to destroy his secret papers but refused to do so. Picot, who thought the war would last just a couple of weeks, hid his documents behind a panel in the consulate building.

The hiding place of the documents was known to another Maronite, Philippe Effendi Zalzal, employed as a dragoman at the embassy. Zalzal was deported by the Ottomans to Damascus. When Picot did not return he panicked and, fearing he would be exiled to Anatolia, made contact with Djemal Pasha the Ottoman governor of the Syria province, to offer the information in exchange for a return to Beirut. The French consulate came under the protection of the neutral American consul, who placed seals on its doors. These were broken on 12 November 1914 when an Ottoman army unit, guided by Zalzal, broke in and removed a quantity of paperwork including Picot's secret documents. More papers, from the consulate archive, were removed on 27 September 1915.

In early 1916, frustrated with the lack of Ottoman success in the war, Djemal ordered the arrest of some of those residents of Syria known to have corresponded with the French. Al-Hani, the sole signer of the March 1913 letter who had remained in the Ottoman Empire during the war, was among those arrested. Djemal was reluctant at first to prosecute Muslim Arabs over the correspondence, for fear of causing a rift in the Empire – the Arab populace was in danger of revolt. He selected al-Hani as a man who could be publicly tried without offence to the Muslims. Al-Hani was tried for treason at a court martial in Aley on 26 February 1916. Convicted, he was publicly hanged at the Burj (main square) in Beirut at 5 am on 5 April 1916. His last words were "I have lived a blameless life and I die without fear". He was buried on the beach. The French had been unaware of the capture of the secret documents until al-Hani was executed.

Arab leaders Faisal and Hussein, who remained at this point nominally loyal to the Ottoman Empire (ahead of the June 1916 start of the Arab Revolt) pleaded with Djemal to limit the sentencing of other Arabs implicated in the seized documents to imprisonment. Hussein threatened that "blood will cry for blood". On 6 May Djemal hanged fourteen more men in Beirut and seven in Damascus, seventeen of these were Muslims and the remainder Christians. The square where al-Hani and the others were hanged in Beirut is now known as Martyrs' Square and 6 May is commemorated as Martyrs' Day in modern-day Lebanon and Syria.
