= Jezreel Valley Railway monument =

Jezreel Valley railway monument
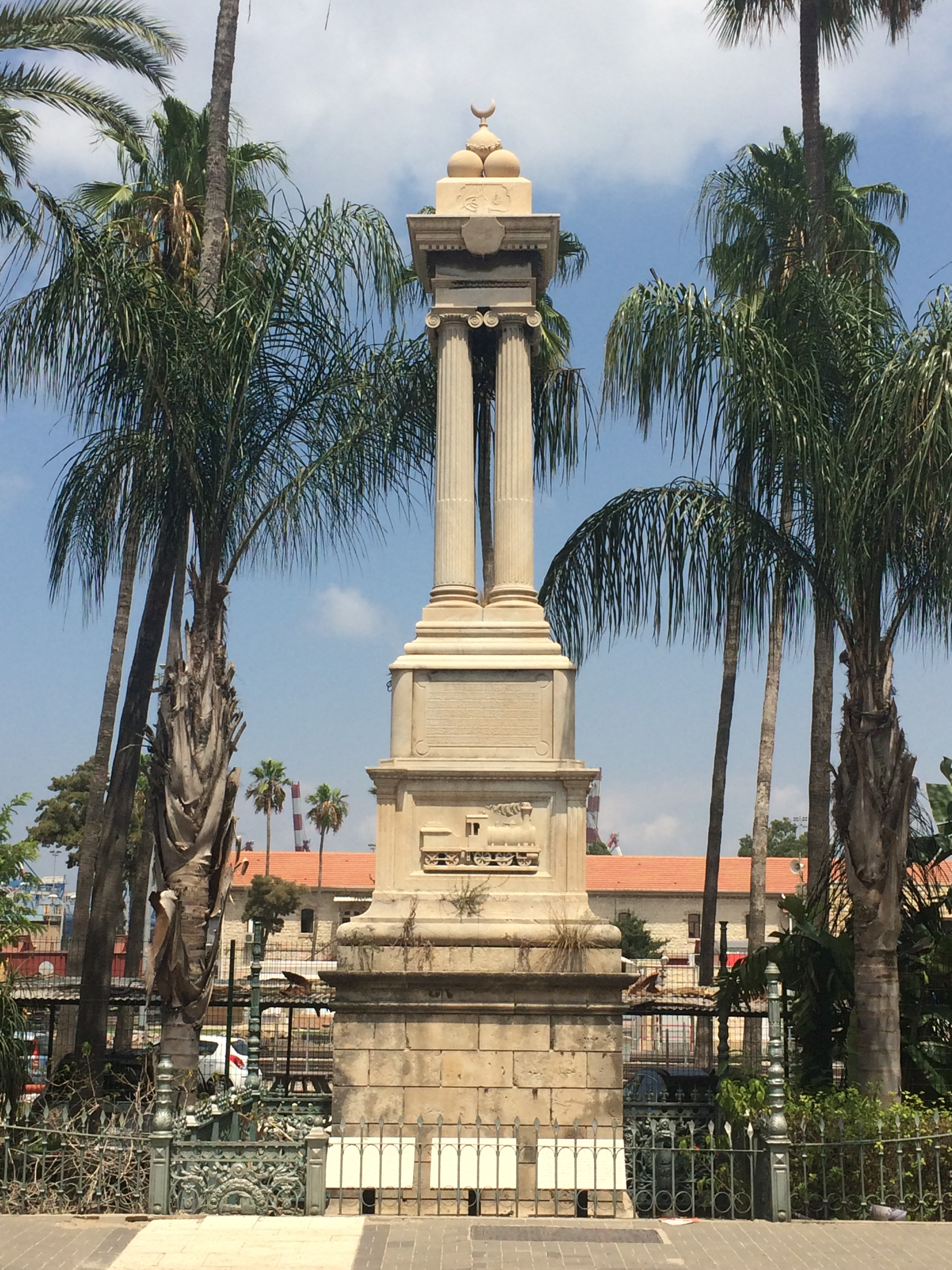
- View of the front of the monument.
- Artist: Raimondo D'Aronco
- Year: 15 October 1905
- Type: Monument
- Medium: Stone
- Subject: Opening of the Jezreel Valley Railway
- Location: Israel Railway Museum; Haifa, Israel

The Jezreel Valley Railway monument, located in Haifa, Israel, is a commemorative monument celebrating the opening of the Jezreel Valley Railway by the Ottoman Empire in 1905. It was designed in Istanbul and transported by sea to Haifa for the official opening of the railway.

== History ==
The monument was designed by Italian sculptor Raimondo D'Aronco in Istanbul in 1903 and shipped to Haifa for the opening of the railway on 15 October 1905 (which was also the sultan’s birthday). It was presented in a ceremony in front of a large crowd at the new Haifa railway station. It stands as a "reminder of the railway’s importance as a projection of the imperial authority, as well as its material value to Ottoman trade and communications". It has relief carvings depicting a steam locomotive and Ottoman insignia. It also contains an inscription in Turkish (see below).

Monuments such as this and the Telegraph Column in Damascus were designed to commemorate the "charitable works" of Abdul Hamid II for his people; the railway would be used to carry pilgrims to the Hajj

== Description ==
The monument consists of four fluted Ionian columns with a square entablature with an architrave supported by the columns. The entablature is supported by four stone balls, with one ball on top crowned with flowers and supporting an Islamic crescent. At the base of the monument, the pedestal has carved bas-relief of a steam locomotive with tender on one side and a winged wheel on another. Tughras appear at various locations on the monument. An inscription in Turkish on the second level of the monument reads: "Our lord and master… Abdülhamid … has commanded the construction of a railway line from Damascus to facilitate for the nation of Muhammad the pilgrimage to the house of God (ed. Mecca) … The Sultan then gave his grand command, may God lengthen his rule, that a railway line should be laid from Haifa to connect with the Hammidiyya Hijaz line. Therefore it is the duty of every Muslim who made his pilgrimage to the house of God and availed himself of the visit to the grave of the Prophet to pray to God to support the Sultan’s Grand Caliphate and to raise his hand high over the heads of the people. Inscribed in 1319 /20 April 1901 – 9 April 1902"
