= Tomb of the Unknown Soldier (Damascus) =

- ضريح الجندي المجهول
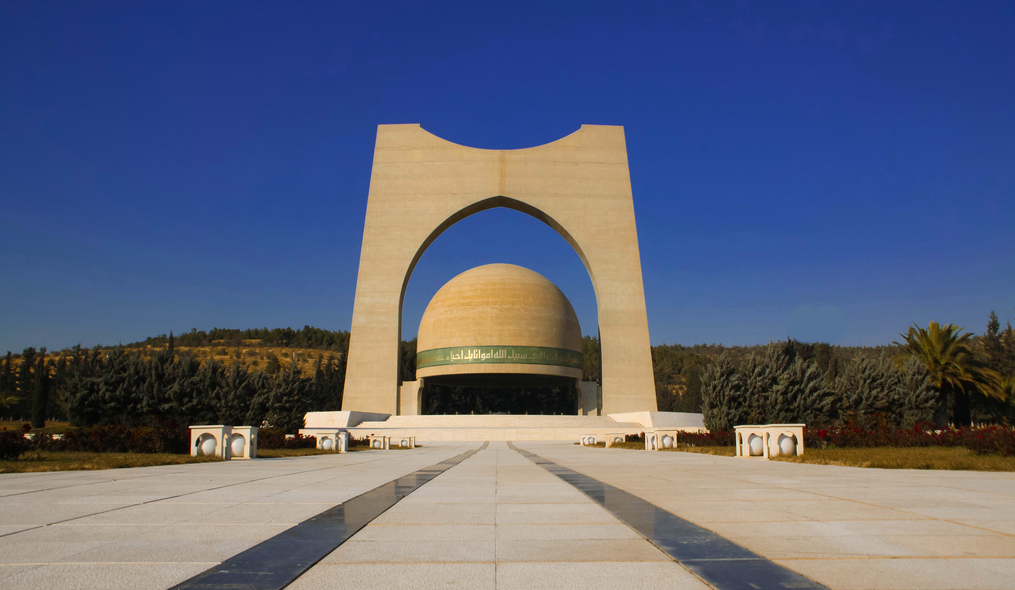
- The exterior of the tomb
- Interactive map of the Tomb of the Unknown Soldier area

General information
- Type: Mausoleum
- Location: Damascus, Syria
- Coordinates: 33°31′33″N 36°15′17″E
- Completed: 1985

Height
- Height: 20 metres (66 ft)

Dimensions
- Diameter: 40 metres (130 ft)

Technical details
- Floor area: 126,000 square metres (1,360,000 ft^{2}) (With the gardens)

Design and construction
- Architects: Mahmoud Hammad, Abdo Kass-Hout
- Other designers: Hassan Tourkami

The Tomb of the Unknown Soldier (Arabic: ضريح الجندي المجهول) is a war memorial, dedicated to the Syrian soldiers killed during battle. It was visited every year by the President of Syria on Martyrs' Day (May 6) prior to the fall of the Assad regime.

Two Quran verses are engraved into the monument:

Think not of those who are slain in God's Way as dead. Nay, they live, finding their sustenance in the Presence of their Lord; They rejoice in the Bounty provided by God: and with regard to those left behind, who have not yet joined them (in their bliss), the (Martyrs) glory in the fact that on them is no fear, nor have they (cause to) grieve.

== See also ==
- Tomb of the Unknown Soldier
