= Martyrs' Day (Lebanon) =

Commemorative holiday

Martyrs' Day عيد الشهداء
- Observed by: Lebanese
- Type: National
- Significance: Syrian and Lebanese nationalists executed in Damascus and Beirut by the Ottomans
- Observances: Flowers, moment of silence
- Date: 6 May
- Next time: 6 May 2027
- Frequency: annual

Martyrs' Day (Arabic: عيد الشهداء) is a Lebanese national holiday commemorating the Syrian and Lebanese Muslim-Christian Arab nationalists executed in Damascus and Beirut on 6 May 1916 by Jamal Pasha, also known as 'Al Jazzar' or 'The Butcher', the Ottoman wāli of Greater Syria. They were executed in both the Marjeh Square in Damascus and Burj Square in Beirut. Both plazas have since been renamed Martyrs' Square.

== Rise of nationalism in early 20th century ==
The Ottoman Empire (now Turkey) ruled over Lebanon and Syria from its conquest in 1516 to the end of World War I in 1918.

=== Turkish nationalism ===
In the early 20th century, a new wave of Turkish nationalism started seething in Istanbul. It came to be known as Jön Türkler, from the French Les Jeunes Turcs (The Young Turks). For the first time, Turks spoke of specific Turkish nationalism against the generalised Islamic Ottoman Empire. The movement resulted in an unlikely union of reform-minded pluralists, Turkish nationalists, Western-oriented secularists and indeed anyone else who accorded the Sultan political blame for the harried state of the empire. The movement grew and resulted in the Young Turk Revolution, which began on 3 July 1908 and quickly spread throughout the empire.

=== Arab nationalism ===
Inspired by the Young Turk Revolution, Arab delegates and political figures of the Empire began to speak of the Western notion of Arab nationalism (Arabic: القومية العربية) as well. The Arabs' demands were of a reformist nature and were limited in general to 'autonomy', 'greater use of Arabic in education' and 'changes in conscription in the Ottoman Empire in peacetime for Arab conscripts' that allowed local service in the Ottoman army. At this stage, Arab nationalism was not yet a mass movement, even in Syria, where it was the strongest. Many Arabs gave their primary loyalty to their religion or sect, their tribe or their own particular governments. The ideologies of Ottomanism and Pan-Islamism were strong competitors of Arab nationalism.

However, as Turkish nationalism grew, discussion of Arab cultural identity and demands for greater autonomy for Greater Syria grew. These demands had been predominantly taken up by Christian Arabs for years but were now joined by some Syrian Muslim Arabs. Various public or secret societies (the Beirut Reform Society led by Salim Ali Salam, 1912; the Ottoman Party for Administrative Decentralization, 1913; al-Qahtaniyya, 1909; al-Fatat, 1911; and al-Ahd, 1913) were formed to advance demands ranging from autonomy to independence for the Ottoman Arab provinces. Members of some of these groups came together at the request of al-Fatat to form the Arab Congress of 1913. The dissolution of the Ottoman Empire had begun.

Resultantly, in 1913, intellectuals and politicians from the Arab Mashriq met in Paris at the first Arab Congress at which desired reforms were discussed. They produced a set of demands for greater autonomy within the Ottoman Empire. They again demanded for Arab conscripts to the Ottoman army not to be required to serve in other regions except in time of war.

== Fall of Arab nationalism ==
=== Jamal Pasha ===
The situation, however, lost momentum and took a blow with the events that unfolded next. In 1914, the Ottoman Empire allied itself with the German Empire and formed the Ottoman–German Alliance. It was the binding alliance that ultimately led the Ottoman Empire to enter the First World War in August 1914 on the side of the Central Powers (composed of Germany, Austria-Hungary and Bulgaria) in battling the Triple Entente or the Allied Forces of Britain, France and Russia later joined by the United States.

The outbreak of World War I brought Greater Syria further problems. The Ottoman government abolished Lebanon's semi-autonomous status and appointed Jamal Pasha, then minister of the navy, as the commander in chief of the Turkish forces in Greater Syria, with discretionary powers. Known for his harshness, Jamal Pasha was nicknamed "Al Jazzar", or "The Butcher". He militarily occupied Lebanon and indirectly killed a quarter of its population by starvation.

Indeed, in February 1915, frustrated by his unsuccessful attack on the British forces protecting the Suez Canal, Jamal Pasha initiated a blockade of the entire eastern Mediterranean coast to prevent supplies from reaching his enemies. Lebanon suffered more than any other Ottoman province. The blockade resulted in a grave food shortage with swarms of locust invading Lebanon. The result was famine, followed by plague, which killed more than a quarter of the population.

=== French and British support ===
Because of the growing dissent against Jamal Pasha and the Ottoman Empire, there was a movement on behalf of the Arab nationalists in Greater Syria for an alliance with France and Britain. The French and the British took advantage of the opportunity to support the nationalists to weaken the Ottoman Empire.

The Arab nationalists in Greater Syria, thus, started secretly corresponding with the French Consul in Beirut and explicitly asked the Allies for support. The French Consul in accordance with the British authorities promised support, ammunition, and future sovereignty to the Arab nationalists, provided they revolt.

In the meantime, the British authorities were also secretly corresponding with the Sharif of Mecca, Hussein bin Ali. In their correspondence, the British encouraged the Arabs to revolt in the Ottoman Empire and promised in return the recognition of Arab independence upon the Allies' victory. See Hussein-McMahon Correspondence.

=== French and British betrayal ===
At the same time, collusion was happening across the borders. The Sykes-Picot Agreement was struck between the governments of the United Kingdom and France, where they agreed to subdivide the Arab provinces of the Ottoman Empire (excluding the Arabian peninsula) into areas of future British and French control or influence in case of victory.The terms were negotiated by the French diplomat François Georges-Picot and British Sir Mark Sykes. Nothing in the plan precluded rule through an Arab suzerainty in the areas.

In a devious scheme in which the French consul had to escape Beirut, which was in Ottoman territory, it is said that the French purposely left behind evidence of the Arab nationalists' correspondence with the French Consulate for the Turkish authorities to find them. The French Consulate burned all diplomatic papers except the specific letters of the Arab nationalists. The purpose is proclaimed to be the premise of the Sykes-Picot Agreement. If the allies won the war, the Arab nationalists would never let them divide their lands and rule over them, since the promise was to help them gain autonomy.

== Execution of Arab nationalists (1916) ==
The Ottoman authorities found the evidence of the Arab-French correspondence which incriminated the Arab nationalists as "traitors" to the Ottoman Empire.

On May 6, 1916, Jamal Pasha publicly executed seven Arabs in Damascus and fourteen in Beirut simultaneously for alleged pro-Entente activities. The date, May 6, is commemorated annually in both countries as Martyrs' Day, and the site in Beirut has come to be known as Martyrs' Square. Jamal Pasha later became known as the “Butcher of Syria”

=== Nationalists executed in Damascus ===
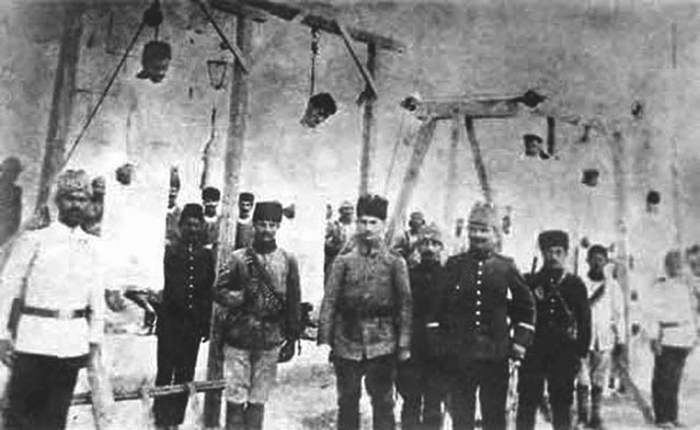
Djemal Pasha, the Ottoman minister of the navy, publicly executed Syrian nationalists who espoused and disseminated anti-Ottoman viewpoints and agitated against the Ottoman military presence in Syria.

The following nationalists were executed in Marjeh Square, which came to be known as Martyrs' Square, in Damascus on May 6, 1916:

- Shafiq al-Muayyad al-Azm: Syrian Official Delegate for Damascus to the Turkish Parliament, son of former Sultan's advisor Muayad Pasha al-Azm, and grandson of former wāli of Damascus and Egypt Nassouh Pasha al-Azm. Shafiq al-Azm is also the grandfather-in-law of former Lebanese prime minister Abdallah El-Yafi.
- Abdelhamid al-Zahrawi: Journalist and founder of Homs-based newspaper "al-Minbar". In 1913, he called for and headed the first Arab Congress in Paris.
- Rushdi al-Shamaa: MP for Damascus in 1908.
- Omar al-Jazairi
- Shukri al-Asali: MP for Damascus in 1908.
- Salim Ahmad Abdul Hadi: Member of the Decentralization Party
- Rafiq Rizq Salloum: Lawyer and Poet

=== Nationalists executed in Beirut ===
The Martyrs' Square in 2008 after the reconstruction

The following nationalists were executed in Sahat al-Burj, or Place des Canons, which later came to be known as Martyrs' Square, in Beirut on May 6, 1916:

- Emir Aref Chehab
- Saïd Fadel Akl, prominent lawyer, journalist, and author
- Father Joseph Hayek
- Abdul Karim al-Khalil, from Chyah
- Abdelwahab al-Inglizi
- Saleh Haidar, from Baalbek
- Joseph Bshara Hani
- Mohammad Mahmassani, from Beirut
- Mahmoud Mahmassani, brother of Mohammad
- Omar Ali Nashashibi
- Omar Hamad, from Beirut
- Tawfiq al-Bsat, from Saida
- Philippe El Khazen, journalist from Jounieh, Lebanon
- Farid El Khazen, younger brother of Philippe and also a journalist and editor from Jounieh, Lebanon
- Sheikh Ahmad Tabbara
- Petro Paoli, fiance of Mary Ajami
- Abdel Ghani al-Arayssi, editor of al-Mufid newspaper
- Muhammad Chanti, publisher of ad-difa'a newspaper in Jaffa.
- George Ibrahim Haddad, journalist and poet

The martyrs of May 6, 1916 have been immortalized in Lebanese history textbooks, and historical events leading to their hanging are often compulsively memorized by school children.

Martyrs' Square in Beirut has become an even more pivotal landmark for the Lebanese people as it held the famous 2005 Cedar Revolution following the assassination of former Prime Minister Rafic Hariri.

== Consequences of the war ==
The periphery of the Empire started to splinter under the pressures of local revolutions and Allies' victories. The Ottoman Empire eventually lost the war and was dissolved.

The Sykes-Picot Agreement is seen by many as a turning point in Western-Arab relations. It negated the promises made to Arabs through T. E. Lawrence for a national Arab homeland in the area of Greater Syria, in exchange for their siding with British forces against the Ottoman Empire. The agreement's principal terms were reaffirmed by the inter-Allied San Remo conference of 19–26 April 1920 and the ratification of the resulting League of Nations mandates by the Council of the League of Nations on 24 July 1922.

It is impossible to say what directions the proposed Arab Nationalistic reforms of 1913 would have taken if the war, the fall of the Ottoman Empire and the Balfour Declaration had not happened. It is clear, however, that the Arabs never gained the freedoms that they sought from either the Ottomans or the Allies. The different form of Arab nationalism that came about after World War II is attributable to other factors, such as the decline of colonial influence, rather than the constructive hopes of reforms which were debated back in 1913.

== Today ==
Some remains of the old Cinema Opera building (now a Virgin Megastore) and the bronze Martyrs statue are the only features left of the Martyrs' Square. The statue, which was inaugurated on March 6, 1960, is the work of the Italian sculptor Renato Marino Mazzacurati. The statue, riddled with bullet holes, has become a symbol for all that was destroyed during the Lebanese Civil War.

The Martyrs' Square is a common location for protests and demonstrations. Among the most notable demonstrations were the 2005 Cedar Revolution protests, which led to the expulsion of the Syrian army presence in Lebanon, and the 2019–20 Lebanese protests, the cross-confessional anti-government protests that were the largest that the country has experienced.

== Commemoration ==
Traditionally, the presidents of both countries pay their respects on Martyrs' Day by visiting the Tomb of the Unknown Soldier before the fall of the Assad regime.

In October 2025, Syrian President Ahmed al-Sharaa issued a presidential decree defining the country’s official holidays, removing Martyrs' Day from the list.

== See also ==
- Ahmad Qasir
