= Telegraph Column (Damascus) =

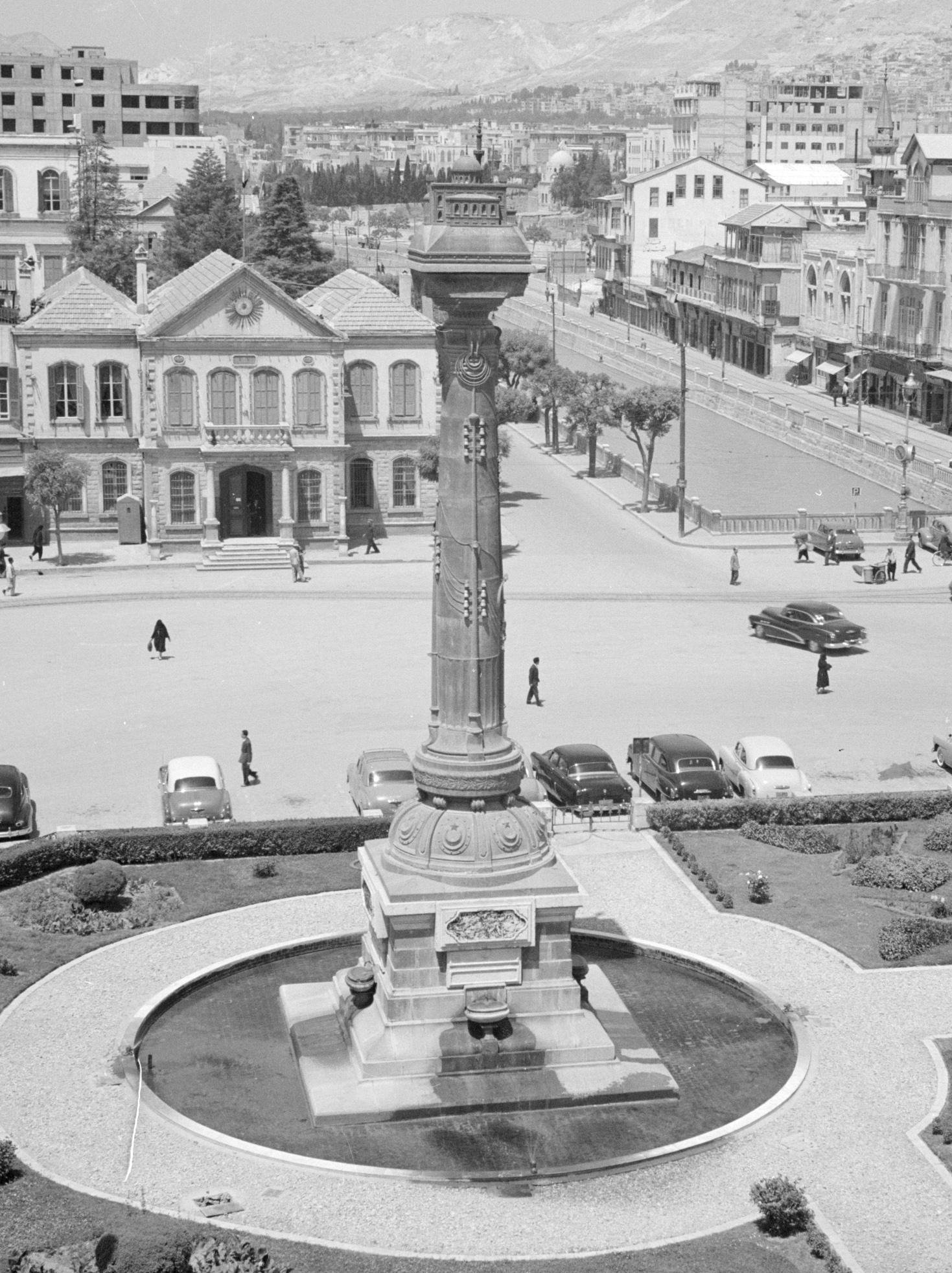
- View of the monument in 1950
- Artist: Raimondo D'Aronco
- Year: 1907
- Type: Monument
- Medium: cast-iron
- Subject: the finishing of the telegraph line between the Syrian capital and the holy sites in the Hijaz
- Location: Damascus, Syria; 33°30′46″N 36°17′53″E

The Telegraph Column, located in Damascus, Syria, is a commemorative monument celebrating the completion of the telegraph line between that city and Hajj sites, in the former Ottoman Empire. It was designed by Raimondo D'Aronco.

== History ==
Monuments such as this and the Jezreel Valley Railway monument in Haifa were designed to commemorate the charitable works of Abdul Hamid II for his people; the railway would be used to carry pilgrims to the Hajj and the telegraph would allow rapid communication between the two locations.

== Description ==
The monument consists of a cast-iron column on stone base adorned with representations of telegraph lines and insulators running along the pole. The notable feature of the monument is the mosque on top of the column. The mosque at the top of the column is a scale replica of the Yıldız Hamidiye Mosque at the entrance of the Yıldız Palace in Istanbul.

Written on the four sides of the base of the column:

" أمير المؤمنين خليفة رسول رب العالمين شوكتلو مهاتبلو السلطان ابن السلطان السلطان الغازي عبد الحميد خان ثاني افند مزحضر نلرنيك حجاز خطة مباركة سنة تمديد امر وفرمان بيور دفلري تلغراف خطنك خاطرة فاخره سيد "

This text written in Ottoman Turkish, using Arabic Script, roughly translates to: "Amir Al Mu'minin, Caliph of the Messenger of the Lord of the World. His Majesty, the Sultan,(who is) the son of a Sultan, the Ghazi Sultan Abdul Hamid Khan II, Effendi — by his presence and authority, has commissioned the blessed plan to extend the telegraph line to the Hijaz. This decree and order have been issued, and the work has been executed with noble and distinguished care."

The current monument is designed in an Art-Nouveau styling and breaks from an earlier design that would have used an obelisk on a pedestal with four fountains. Opened in the early 1900s, it "is an elegant, bulbous column festooned with faux telegraph wires". The use of architecture atop the column instead of a figurative statue serves as a unique indication of Ottoman power. The monument is a focal point of Marjeh Square in Damascus. It served as a symbol of the municipal administration until circa 2010.
