= Djemal Pasha =

Ottoman military leader (1872–1922)

Ahmed Cemal Pasha
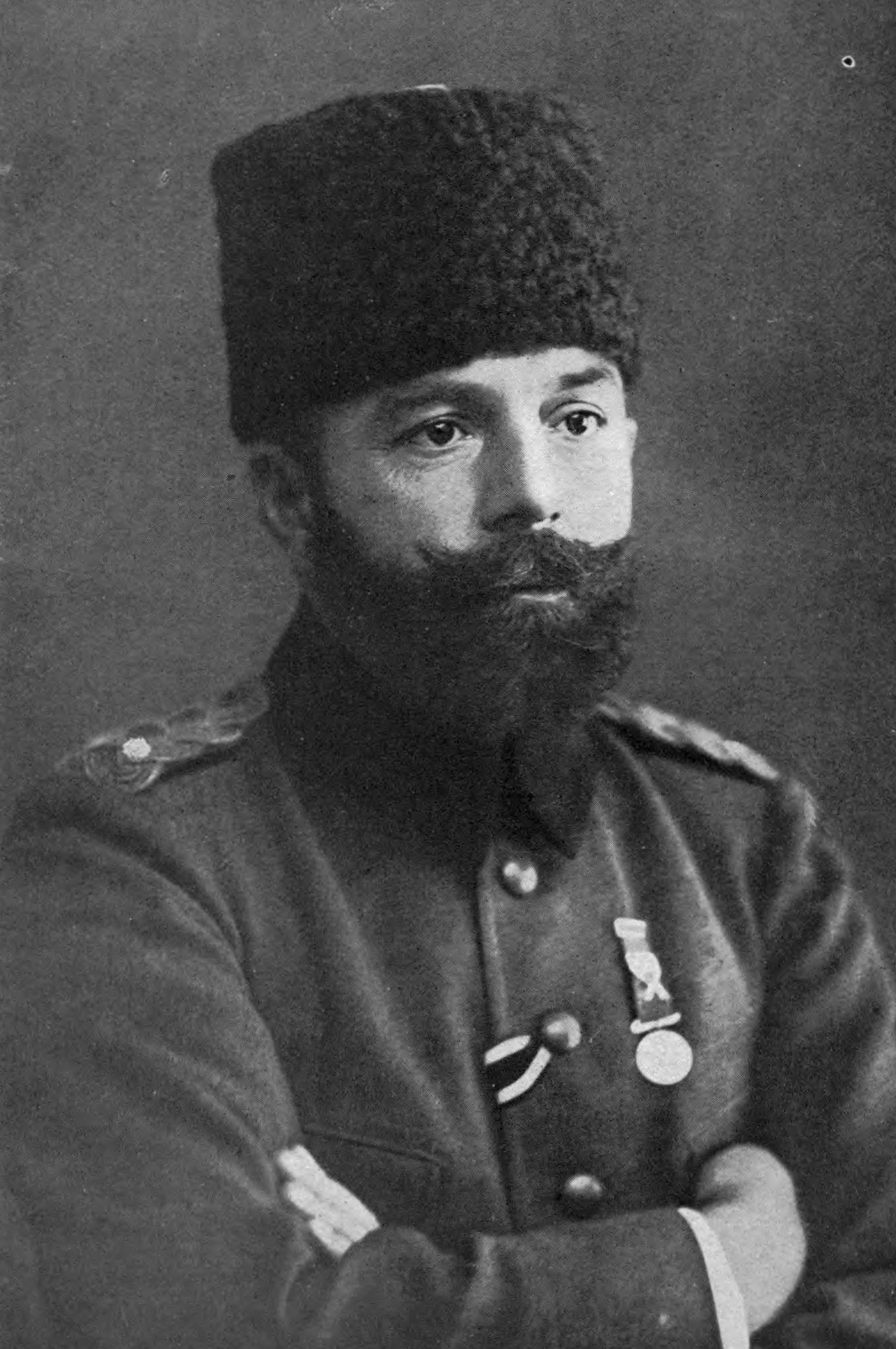

Minister of Public Works
- In office 17 December 1913 – 10 March 1914
- Monarch: Mehmed V
- Grand Vizier: Said Halim Pasha
- Preceded by: Osman Nizami Pasha
- Succeeded by: Çürüksulu Mahmud Pasha

Minister of the Navy
- In office 10 March 1914 – 14 October 1918
- Monarchs: Mehmed V Mehmed VI
- Grand Vizier: Said Halim Pasha; Talaat Pasha
- Preceded by: Çürüksulu Mahmud Pasha
- Succeeded by: Hüseyin Rauf Pasha

Personal details
- Born: 6 May 1872 Midilli, Ottoman Empire
- Died: 21 July 1922 (aged 50) Tbilisi, Georgian SSR
- Relations: Hasan Cemal (grandson)
- Children: 5

Military service
- Allegiance: Ottoman Empire; Emirate of Afghanistan (1920–1922)
- Years of service: 1893–1918
- Rank: General
- Commands: Fourth Army
- Battles/wars: Macedonian Struggle; 31 March Incident; Balkan Wars; First Balkan War; Second Balkan War; World War I; Sinai and Palestine Campaign; Suez Canal; Megiddo; First Battle of Gaza; Capture of Jericho; Second Battle of Gaza; Charge at Irbid; Mesopotamia Campaign; Arab Revolt; Battle of Wadi Musa; Tafas massacre

Ahmed Djemal Pasha (Ottoman Turkish: احمد جمال پاشا; Turkish: Ahmed Cemâl Paşa; 6 May 1872 – 21 July 1922) was an Ottoman general and statesman. Along with Talaat and Enver, he was one of the Three Pashas that ruled the Ottoman Empire during World War I.

As an officer of the II Corps, he was stationed in Salonica, where he developed political sympathies for the Committee of Union and Progress (CUP), a secret reformist party. He was initially praised by Christian missionaries and provided support to the Armenian victims of the Adana massacres.

In the course of his army career Djemal developed a rivalry with Mustafa Kemal (later known as Atatürk), served in Salonica on the frontlines of the Balkan Wars and was given command of Constantinople after the Raid on the Sublime Porte. Djemal's authoritarian three-year rule in Syria alienated the local population who opposed Turkish nationalism. His role in the Armenian genocide has been controversial as his policies were not as deadly as other CUP leaders; Djemal favored the forced assimilation of the Armenians.

After the Armistice of Mudros and the fall of the CUP government in 1918, Djemal fled the Ottoman Empire and was sentenced to death in absentia by the Special Military Tribunal. He was assassinated four years later in Tbilisi by members of the Armenian Revolutionary Federation.

== Early life and career ==
Ahmed Djemal was born in Mytilene, Lesbos, to Mehmed Nesib Bey, a military pharmacist. Djemal graduated from Kuleli Military High School in 1890 and completed his studies at the Military Academy (Mektebi Harbiyeyi Şahane), the staff college in Istanbul, in 1893. He was posted to serve with the 1st Department of the Imperial General Staff (Seraskerlik Erkânı Harbiye), and then he worked at the Kirkkilise Fortification Construction Department bound to Second Army. Djemal was assigned to the II Army Corps in 1896. Two years later, he was appointed staff commander of the Novice Division, stationed on the Salonica frontier.

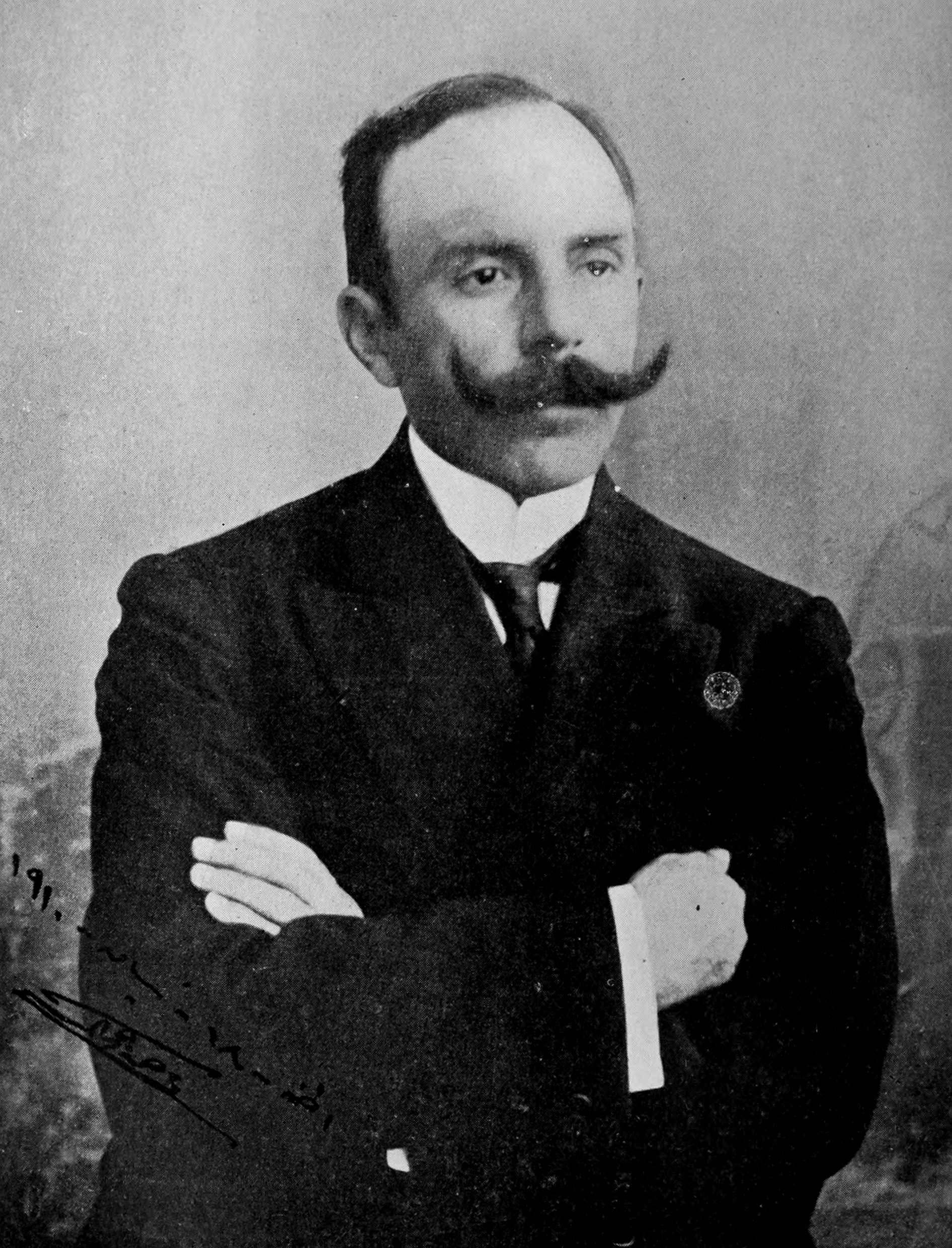
Djemal Pasha (1910) when he was governor of Adana

Meanwhile, he began to sympathize with the Committee of Union and Progress (CUP), and joined the organization in 1898. It was in 1905 that Djemal was promoted to major and designated Inspector of Rumelia Railways. The following year he signaled his democratic credentials and joined the Ottoman Freedom Society. He became influential in the department of military issues of the Committee of Union and Progress. He was elected to the board of the III Army Corps in 1907. Following the Young Turk Revolution in 1908 he became a member of the central committee (Merkezi Umum-i) of the CUP and later was deployed as a Kaymakam to Üsküdar, Constantinople.

Djemal served as the governor of the Adana Vilayet between August 1909 and April 1911. In Adana, he was involved in providing support for the Armenian victims of the Adana massacres, and was praised by Christian missionaries in the region as a competent administrator. He was also military governor of Istanbul in 1909, 1910, 1912, and 1913. In the III Army Corps, he worked with future Turkish statesmen Major Fethi (Okyar) and Mustafa Kemal (Atatürk), although Atatürk soon developed a rivalry with Djemal Pasha and his colleagues over their policies after they seized power in 1913.

== Balkan Wars ==
In 1911, Djemal was appointed Governor of Baghdad. He then resigned to rejoin the army in the Balkan Wars on the Salonica front line, attempting to protect Turkey's European possessions. In October 1912, he was promoted to colonel. At the end of the First Balkan War, he played an important role in the propaganda drawn up by the CUP against negotiations with the victorious European countries. He tried to resolve the problems that occurred in Constantinople after the Coup of 1913, he became the martial-law commander of Constantinople and was appointed Minister of Public Works by Grand Vizier Mahmud Sevket Pasha. Djemal played a significant role in the Second Balkan War. By December 1913 he was given the title Pasha and in February 1914, he was promoted to Minister of the Ottoman Navy.

== World War I ==
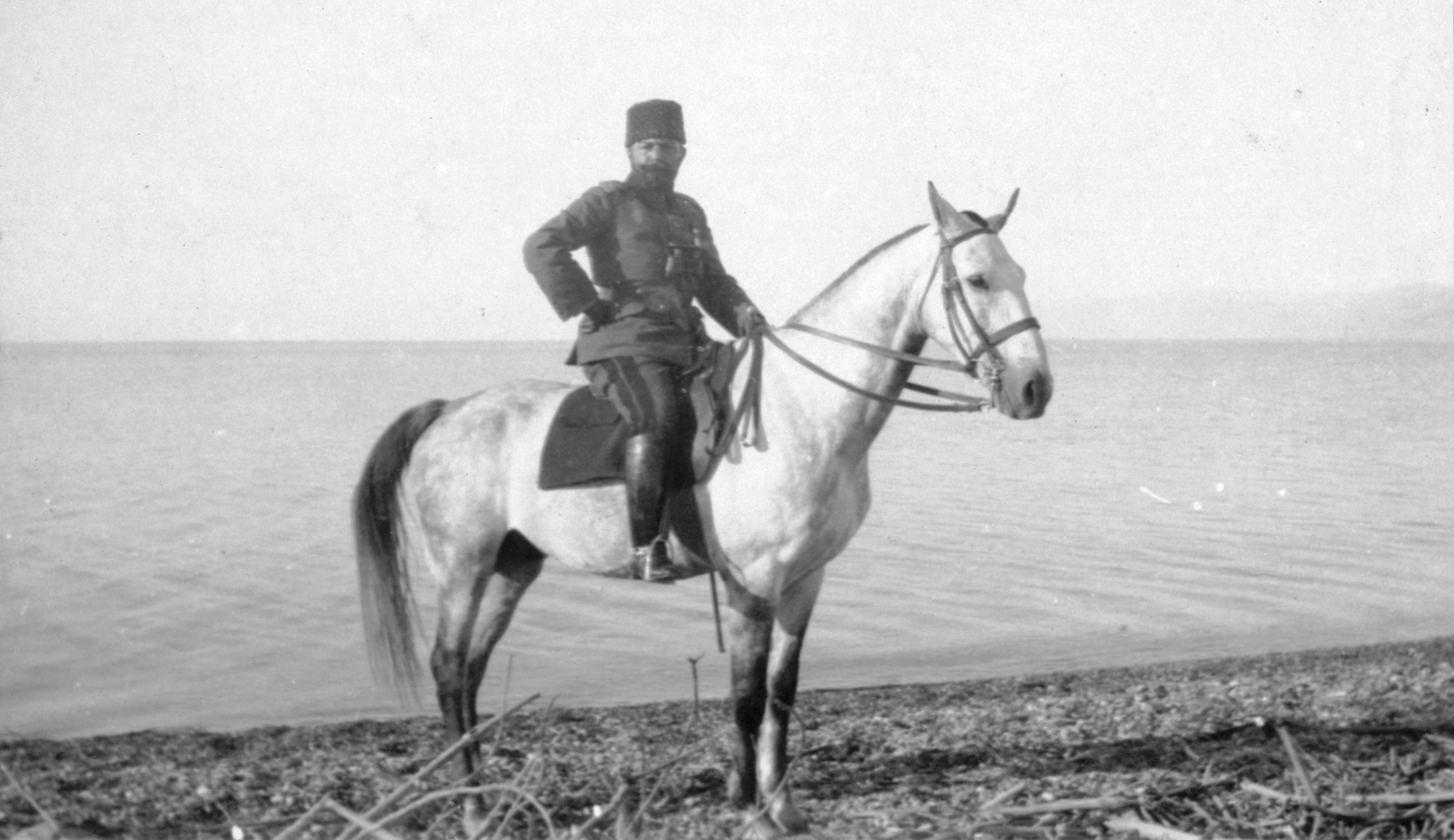
Ahmed Djemal on the shore of the Dead Sea in 1915

When Europe was divided into two blocs before the First World War, he supported an alliance with France. He went to France to negotiate an alliance with the French, but failed and then sided with Enver and Talaat, who favoured the German side. Djemal, along with Enver and Talaat, took control of the Ottoman government in 1913. The Three Pashas effectively ruled the Ottoman Empire for the duration of World War I.

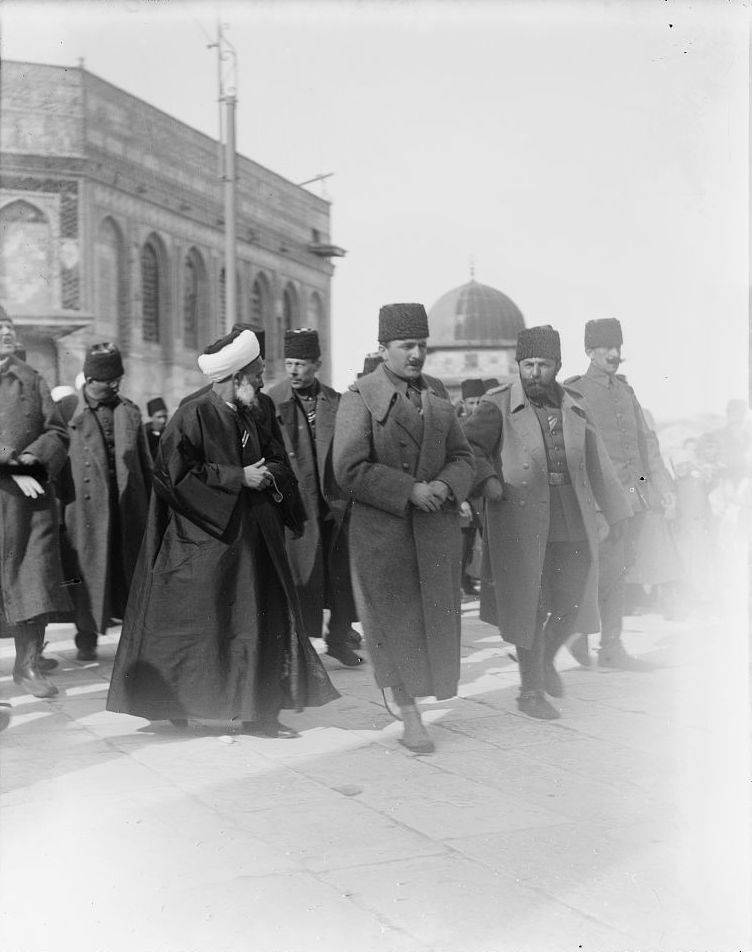
Djemal Pasha and Enver Pasha visiting the Dome of the Rock in Jerusalem, circa. 1916

Previously snubbed by the Allies, Djemal switched his attention to an alliance with the Central Powers, although he had at first been opposed to a full alliance with Germany. Nevertheless, he agreed in early October 1914 to use his ministerial powers to authorise Admiral Souchon to launch a pre-emptive strike in the Black Sea, which led to Russia, Britain and France declaring war on the Ottoman Empire a few days later. After the entry of the Ottoman Empire into the war, Enver Pasha nominated Djemal Pasha to lead the Ottoman army against British forces in Egypt, and Djemal accepted the position. In late 1914, he was assigned to the governorship and military command for the southern provinces of the Ottoman Empire.

=== Rule in Syria ===
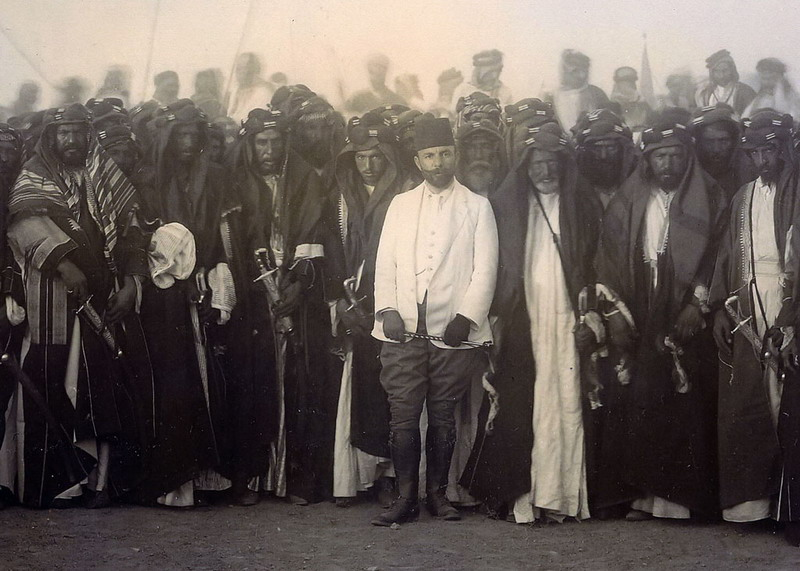
Djemal Pasha with Anazzah tribal leaders in Iraq, celebrating the completion of the al-Hindya dam on the Euphrates river near al-Hilla, south of Baghdad

Djemal Pasha was appointed with full powers in military and civilian affairs in Syria in 1915. A provisional law granted him emergency powers in May of that year. All cabinet decrees from Constantinople concerning Syria became subject to his approval. Both his first and second attacks on the Suez Canal failed. Coupled with the wartime exigencies and natural disasters that afflicted the region during these years, this alienated the population from the Ottoman government, and led to the Arab Revolt. In the meantime, the Ottoman army usually commanded by Colonel Kress von Kressenstein pushed towards and occupied Sinai. The two men had a thinly disguised contempt for each other, which weakened the command.

He was known among the local Arab inhabitants as as-Saffāḥ (Arabic: السَّفّاح, lit. 'The Butcher'), being responsible for the hanging of many Lebanese and Syrian Arab nationalists, including Sunni Muslims, Shia Muslims and Christians, wrongly accused of treason on 6 May 1916 in Damascus and Beirut. In total between 1915 and 1916, Djemal had 34 Syrian and Lebanese politicians and nationalists executed.

Jamal Pasha was praised for his good deeds by some Arab inhabitants of Aleppo, such as the water pipeline he built, which saved Aleppo's population from a severe drought in the summer of 1917. His popularity among some Arab inhabitants of Aleppo can be attributed to the city's orientation toward the Ottoman Empire.

In his political memoirs, the leader of the "Beirut Reform Movement" Salim Ali Salam recalls the following:

Jamal Pasha resumed his campaign of vengeance; he began to imprison most Arab personalities, charging them with treason against the State. His real intent was to cut off the thoughtful heads, so that, as he put it, the Arabs would never again emerge as a force, and no one would be left to claim for them their rights … After returning to Beirut [from Istanbul], I was summoned … to Damascus to greet Jamal Pasha … I took the train … and upon reaching Aley we found that the whole train was reserved for the prisoners there to take them to Damascus … When I saw them, I realized that they were taking them to Damascus to put them to death. So … I said to myself: how shall I be able to meet with this butcher on the day on which he will be slaughtering the notables of the country? And how will I be able to converse with him? … Upon arriving in Damascus, I tried hard to see him that same evening, before anything happened, but was not successful. The next morning all was over, and the … notables who had been brought over from Aley were strung up on the gallows.

At the end of 1915, Djemal with viceregal powers is said to have started secret negotiations with the Allies for ending the war; he proposed to take over the Ottoman administration himself as an independent king of Syria. These secret negotiations came to nothing, in part because the Allies reportedly could not agree on the future territory of the Ottoman Empire; France objected strongly, and Britain was unwilling to fund the imperial operations.

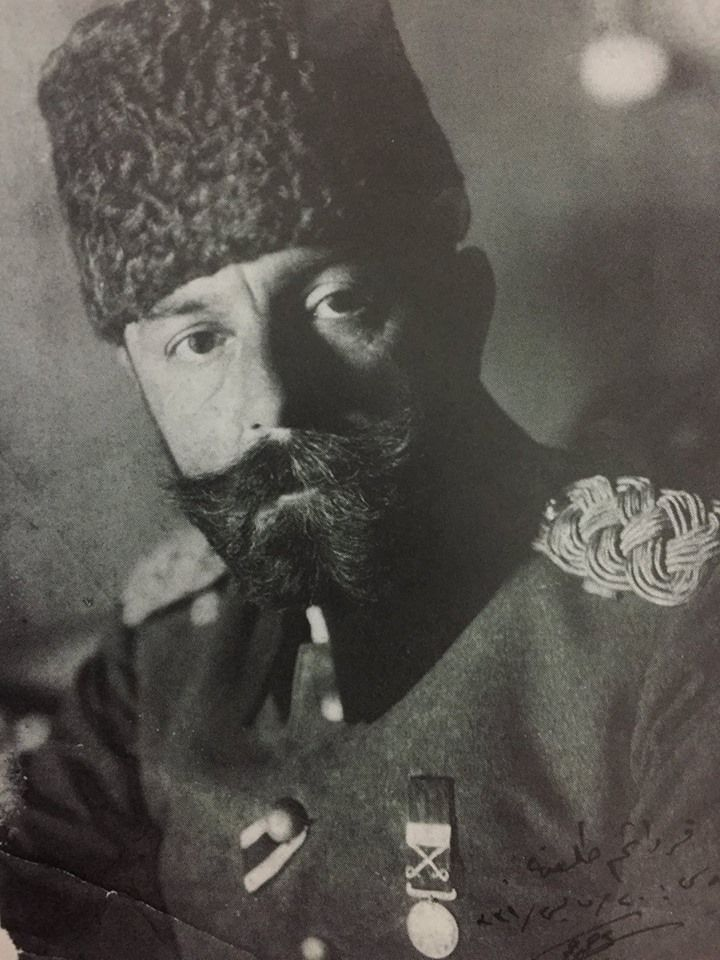
While Minister of Naval Affairs, 1915

His most successful military exploit was against the British Mesopotamian Expeditionary Force, which had arrived in early 1915 from India. 35,000 British troops marched north on Baghdad, hoping to take the citadel with relatively few casualties. Djemal Pasha was appointed to command and marshaled a vast army, ultimately led by Halil Kut Pasha, which by the time of the siege of Kut al-Amara numbered 200,000 Turks and Arab auxiliaries. The British could only evacuate their wounded with Djemal's consent and attempted to send emissaries requesting permission to evacuate while the city was encircled on three sides. Djemal refused to compromise his advantageous position, and strafed enemy attempts by the Tigris Corps to take relief boats up river. They had underestimated Djemal's considerable administrative capabilities and will to resist the Allied armies. The Ottoman troops fought hard at the Battle of Ctesiphon, but the subsequent fate of POWs and civilians later enhanced Djemal Pasha's wartime reputation as a capricious and cruel general. Nonetheless, the successes impressed T. E. Lawrence to write a significant account of their diplomatic encounters when finally Kut fell in April 1916, which provides for "a colourful character". The ever-present threat of Arab Revolt fomented by British intelligence was rising throughout 1916 and 1917. Djemal instituted strict control over Syria Province against Syrian opponents. Djemal's forces also fought against the Arab nationalists and Syrian nationalists from 1916 onwards. Ottoman authorities occupied the French consulates in Beirut and Damascus and confiscated French secret documents that revealed evidence about the activities and names of the Arab insurgents. Djemal used the information from these documents as well as from others belonging to the Decentralization Party. He believed that insurgency under French control was the main reason for his military failings. With the documents he gathered, Djemal moved against the insurgent forces which were led by Arab political and cultural leaders. This was followed by the military trials of the insurgents known as Âliye Divan-ı Harb-i Örfisi in which they were punished.

=== Commander of Fourth Army ===
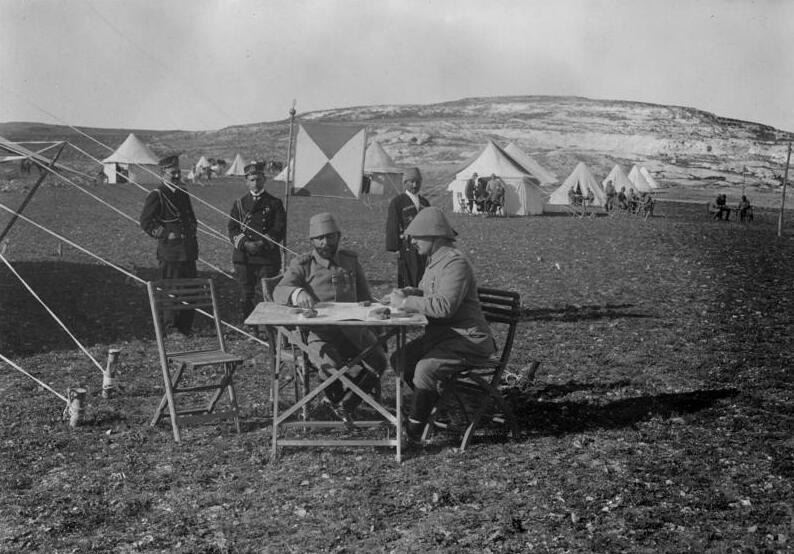
Djemal Pasha and his chief of staff Fuad Bey at a command post in southern Palestine in April 1917

Gaza's head of garrison, Major Tiller, had 7 infantry battalions, a cavalry squadron, and some camel troops. The British under Colonel Chetwode already had 2,000 troops in front of the city. Reluctantly, Djemal marched with the 33rd Division to relieve Gaza. Kressenstein was delighted to have repelled the British assault and wanted to mobilise aggressively by driving into Shellal, Wadi Ghazze, and Khan Yunis, but Djemal absolutely forbade it. The British had a whole division in retreat, so Djemal apprehended that a two-battalion sortie would have been annihilated. One of Djemal's associates in Iraq was engineer Colonel Heinrich August Meissner who had built both the Hejaz and Baghdad railways and who was employed on an ambitious project to construct a railway to the Suez canal at Bir Gifgafa. By October 1915, the Central Powers had already built 100 miles of track as far as the oasis of Beersheba. Djemal insisted that an extended railway would be needed to attack British Egypt.

Djemal was completely committed to the Turco-German military machine, which he saw as necessary to resist the new wave of offensives launched by the British High Command. Mustafa Kemal Pasha and Djemal Pasha became increasingly skeptical of German capabilities, but Djemal was not yet prepared to openly back the German allies. He insisted on the possibility of a planned allied assault behind the Yıldırım Army, as the Seventh Army gathered at the Turco-German Aleppo Conference. In the shake-up that followed, Djemal was demoted to a command of the Fourth Army under General Erich von Falkenhayn. They now adopted a plan similar to the Kress Plan for Gaza and sent the Yıldırım Army to Baghdad. It was not until October 1917 that the Seventh Army could march south to face the growing threat from Edmund Allenby, hampered by the limitations of the single-gauge railway, which was built away from the coastline to avoid Royal Navy salvos. During this time, Djemal presided over the 1917 Jaffa deportation in which he was accused of allowing the Jewish population of Jaffa to be robbed, assaulted, starved and killed.

On 7 November, the British captured Gaza, but Djemal had long since been forced to evacuate. Although chased, he managed to retreat at speed. In December, the Turks were driven out of Jaffa, Djemal's army still in retreat, and the city fell without a fight. Falkenhayn had ordered an evacuation on 14th, and the British had begun to enter the same day. But now the Turkish Eighth formed a much stronger line of entrenchment; Djemal's organized defence of Gaza had been amply anticipated by the British. His army delayed them further at the vital Junction railway station. But the British were probably unaware of its importance.

The fighting in the hills was all but over by 1 December. On 6 December, Djemal Pasha was in Beirut to make a speech publicizing the allied deal to 'carve up' Syria-Palestine into partitioned spheres of influence in the Sykes-Picot agreement. At the end of 1917, Djemal ruled from his post in Damascus as a near-independent ruler of his portion of the Empire. On 9 April and then 19 April 1918, Djemal ordered the evacuation of civilians from Jaffa and Jerusalem. The Germans were furious and rescinded the order, revealing the chaos in the Ottoman Empire. Djemal's ambiguous attitude to the subject populations of the Ottoman Empire proved beneficial to the British colonial authorities. The Turkish line was solidified in readiness for the final onslaught at Nebi Samwell and Nahr-el-Auja. To the south of Nebi Samwell were the defences of Beit Iksa; the Heart and Liver Redoubts before Lifa; and Deir Yassin, two systems behind Ain Karim. In all, there were 4 miles of fortifications. Djemal Pasha was recalled to Istanbul in June 1918. He was sent back to the southern Syrian provinces in August 1918 to defend the Ottoman lines there however the Ottoman Army was forced to retreat and in an act of revenge, Djemal Pasha's forces committed the Tafas massacre against the local Arab population for allying with the advancing British forces. After the defeat of Ottoman forces in World War I, he once again returned to Istanbul.

=== Role in the Armenian Genocide ===
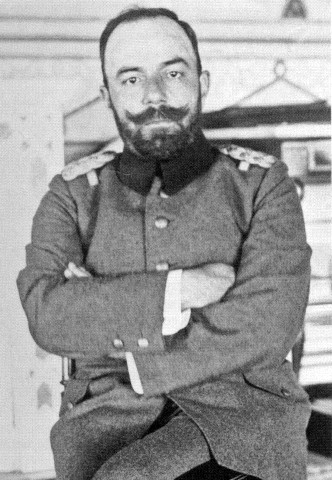
Djemal Pasha

Djemal's role in the Armenian genocide has been contested by historians. His policies allowed some Armenians to survive in the territories under his control. German historian Wolfgang Gust states, "while preserving the lives of perhaps 150,000 Armenians—in terrible conditions—he helped kill another 150,000". In December 1915, he offered to the Entente powers that he would march to Constantinople, overthrow the CUP government, and end the genocide in exchange for the guarantee of the Ottoman Empire's territorial integrity in its pre-World War I borders.

Historian Ümit Kurt argues that "The most fundamental difference between Djemal and the other two leaders [Talat and Enver] was the methods he wanted to employ to decrease the number of Armenians to a level that would no longer pose a threat to the Ottoman state." Instead of killing Armenians, he favored their forced conversion and assimilation to neutralize the perceived Armenian threat. Kurt furthermore argues: "Saving the lives of some fortunate Armenians does not exempt Djemal from the label 'génocidaire', for he was fully committed to the disappearance of Armenians from Ottoman soil."

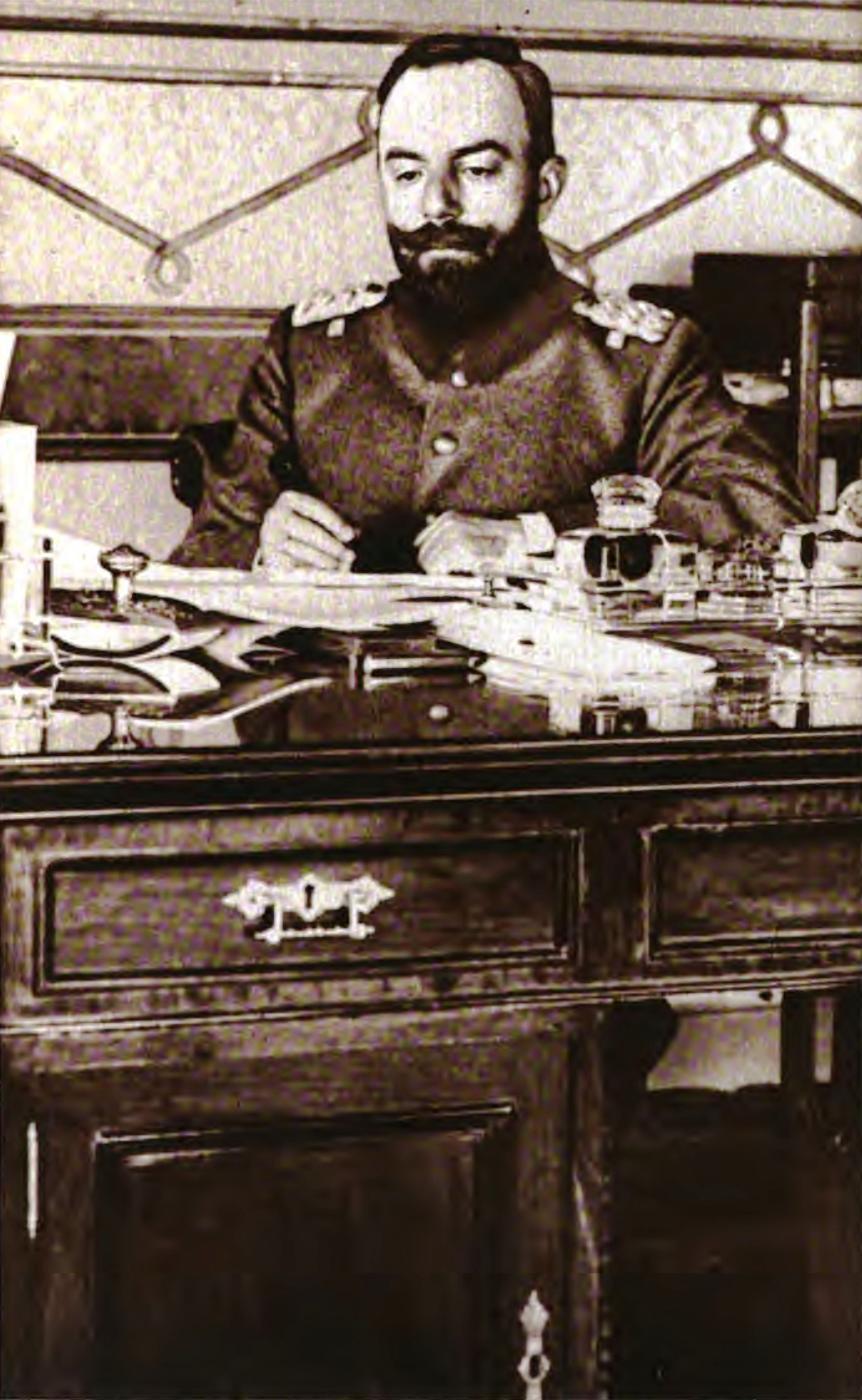
Attending naval matters

In the CUP's penultimate congress held in 1917, Djemal was elected to the Board of Central Administration.

=== Military trial ===
With the defeat of the empire in October 1918 and the resignation of Talaat Pasha's cabinet on 2 November 1918, Djemal fled with seven other leaders of the CUP to Germany, and then Switzerland.

A military court in Turkey accused Djemal of massacring Arab subjects of the Ottoman Empire and sentenced him to death in absentia. Later in 1920, Djemal went to Central Asia, where he worked as a military advisor, charged with modernising the Afghan Royal Army.

== Assassination ==
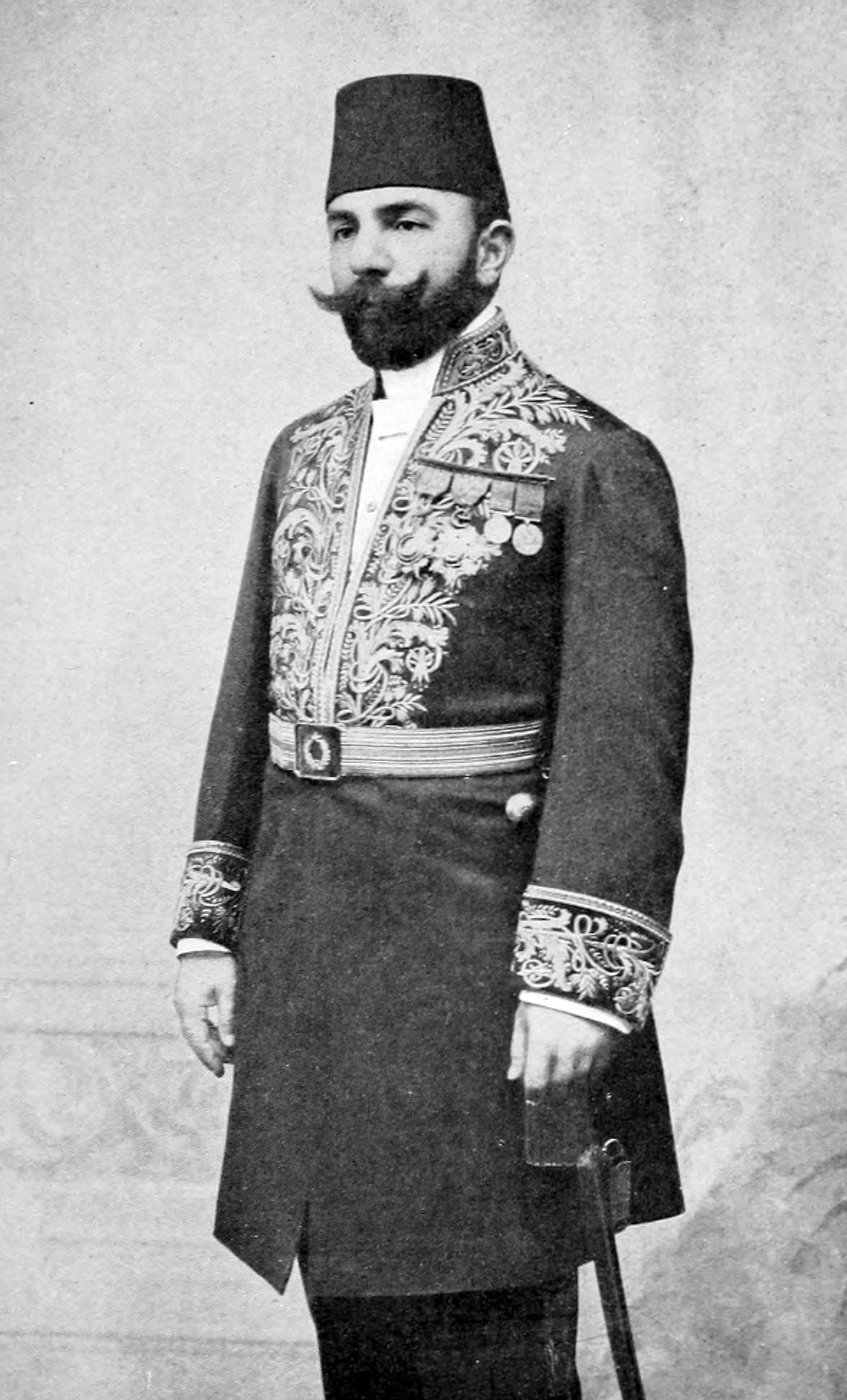
Djemal Pasha wearing diplomatic uniform

Due to the success of the Bolshevik Revolution, Djemal traveled to Tiflis to act as a military liaison officer to negotiate over Afghanistan with the Communist Party of the Soviet Union. He also negotiated for the Soviets to send support to Mustafa Kemal Pasha in his Turkish War of Independence. Together with his secretary, Djemal was assassinated on 21 July 1922 by Armenian Revolutionary Federation members Stepan Dzaghigian, Artashes Gevorgyan, and Petros Ter Poghosyan, as part of Operation Nemesis, a global plan by Armenians to track down and assassinate the surviving chief perpetrators of the Armenian genocide. Djemal's remains were brought to Erzurum and buried there.

== Personal life ==
Djemal Pasha married twice. His first wife was a daughter of Bekir Pasha, and they married on 19 February 1897. She died in childbirth. He married Seniha Hanım in Serres on 2 June 1899, and later they settled in Thessaloniki. They had five children, a daughter and four sons. His grandson, Hasan Cemal, is a well-known columnist, journalist and writer in Turkey.

== Honours ==
- Ottoman Empire:
  - Golden Liakat Medal
  - Golden Imtiyaz Medal
  - Osmanieh Medal, (4th-Class); 16 August 1907
  - First Class Knight Order of the Medjidie, (4th-Class); 22 July 1901
  - First Class Knight Order of the Medjidie, (1st-Class); 14 February 1914
  - Osmanieh Medal, (1st-Class); 26 April 1915
  - Order of Murassa Osmanieh, 18 June 1917
- France:
  - National Order of the Legion of Honour, (2nd-Class); 14 July 1914
- (Austrian Empire) (Kingdom of Hungary) Austria-Hungary:
  - Gold Military Merit Medal; 28 February 1915

== Legacy ==
Djemal Pasha is known as Jamal Basha as-Saffah (Arabic: جمال باشا السفاح, lit. 'Djemal Pasha the Bloodthirsty') in Lebanon and Syria for his treatment of the local population during WWI. Djemal Pasha named a street in Damascus after himself, but the name was later changed to "al-Nasr Street".

In Syria and Lebanon, 6 May is Martyrs' Day, a national holiday that commemorates the execution of seven Syrians in Damascus and 14 in Beirut by Djemal Pasha for their collaboration with the British and French at the height of WWI. The French and British had promised arms and financing for some Syrians and Lebanese actors with the ultimate independence and statehood status, provided they revolt and sabotage the Ottoman war effort. The squares in which the executions occurred in Damascus and in Beirut were renamed "Martyrs' Square" (Arabic: ساحة الشهداء).

== Bibliography ==
- Aaronsohn, A. (1917). With the Turks in Palestine. London.
- Ajay, A. (1974). "Political intrigue and suppression in Lebanon during WWI". International Journal of Middle East Studies. doi:10.1017/S0020743800027793. S2CID 155962400.
- Anderson, Scott (2014). Lawrence in Arabia: War, Deceit, Imperial Folly and the Making of the Modern Middle East. Anchor Books.
- Benson, A. (1918). Crescent and the Iron Cross. London.
- Benz, Wolfgang (2010). Vorurteil und Genozid. Ideologische Prämissen des Völkermords (in German). Böhlau Verlag.
- Cleveland, William (2004). A History of the Modern Middle East. Boulder: Westview Press.
- Djemal Pasha, Ahmed (1922), Memories of a Turkish statesman: 1913–1919, London and New York: George H. Doran Company
- Erickson, E.J. (2001). Ordered to Die: A History of the Ottoman Army in the First World War. Westport, CT.
- Findley, Carter Vaughn (2010). Turkey, Islam, Nationalism, and Modernity. Yale University Press.
- Fromkin, David (1989). A Peace to End All Peace: The Fall of the Ottoman Empire and the Creation of the Modern Middle East. New York: Avon Books.
- G G Gilbar, ed. (1990). Ottoman Palestine. London.
- Haddad, W.W.; Ochsenwald, W. (1977). Nationalism in a Non-Nationalist State: The Dissolution of the Ottoman Empire. Columbus, OH.
- Howard, H.N. (1966). The Partition of Turkey: A Diplomatic History, 1913–1923. Norman, OK.
- von Kressenstein, F Kress (1921). "Zwicken Kaukasus und Sinai". Jahrbuch des Bundes der Aisenkampfer (in German).
- von Kressenstein, F Kress (1938). Mit dem Turken zum Suezkanal (in German). Berlin.
- Lawrence, T.E. (1976). Seven Pillars of Wisdom: A Triumph (5th ed.). London.
- Mango, Andrew (1999). Atatürk: The Biography of the Founder of Modern Turkey. Woodstock, NY: The Overlook Press. ISBN 1-58567-011-1.
- Orga, Irfan (1958). Phoenix Ascendant: The Rise of Modern Turkey. London.
- Provence, Michael (2005). The Great Syrian Revolt and the Rise of Arab Nationalism. University of Texas Press. ISBN 0-292-70680-4.
- Ramsaur, E.E. (1957). The Young Turks: the Prelude to the Revolution of 1908. New York.
- Rubin, Barry M.; Kemal Kirişci (2001). Turkey in World Politics: An Emerging Multiregional Power. Lynne Rienner Publishers. ISBN 978-1-55587-954-9.
- Salibi, K.; Berque, J.; Chevalier, D. (1976). "Beirut under the Young Turks: As Depicted in the Political Memoirs of Salim Ali Salam (1868–1938)". Les Arabes Par Leurs Archives: XVIe–XXe Siecles. Paris: Centre National de la Recherche Scientifique.
