= Marjeh Square =

Public square in Damascus

Marjeh Square ساحة المرجة
- Martyrs' Square ساحة الشهداء
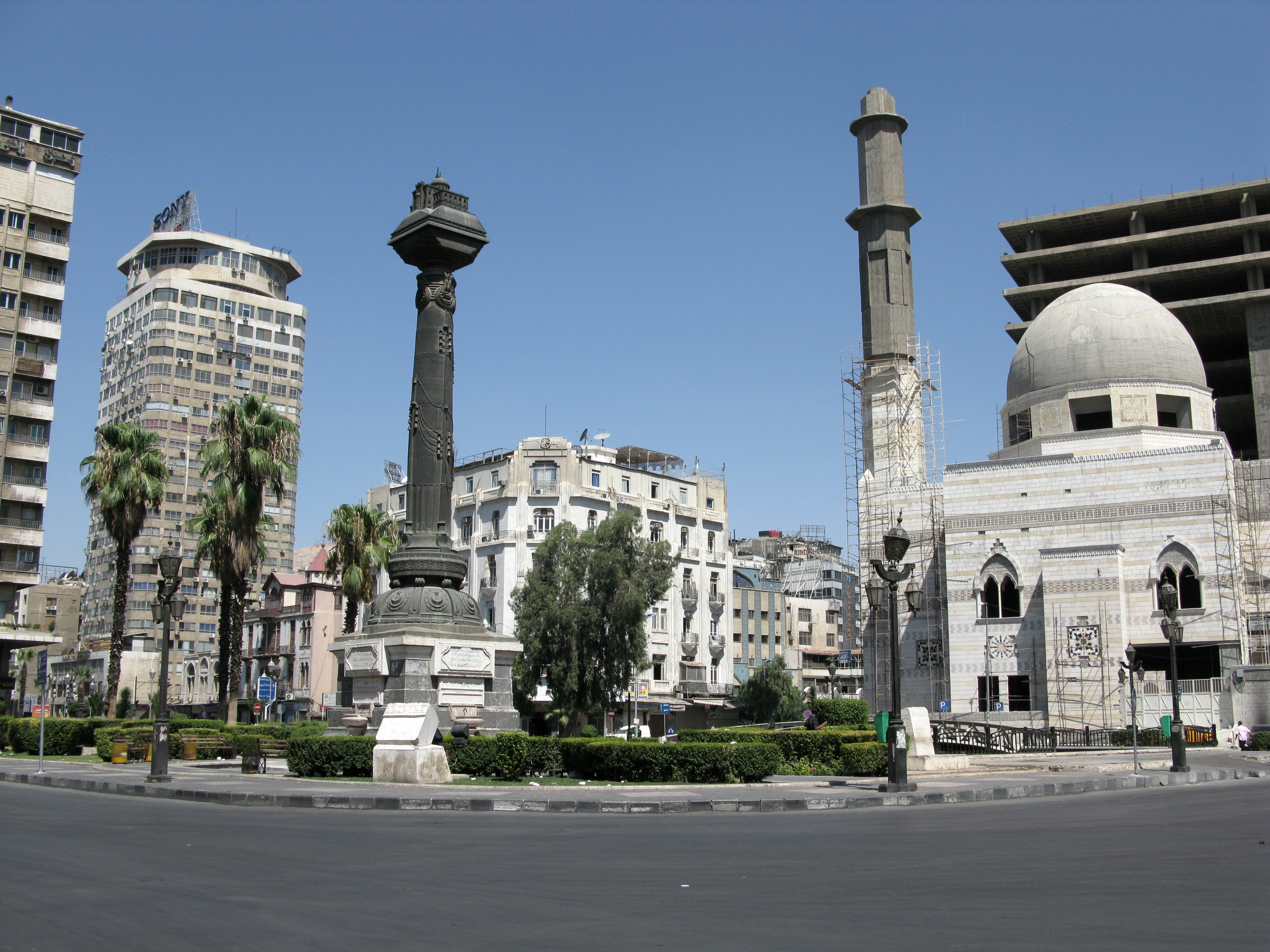
- The square and the Yalbugha Mosque in 2008

- Location within Damascus

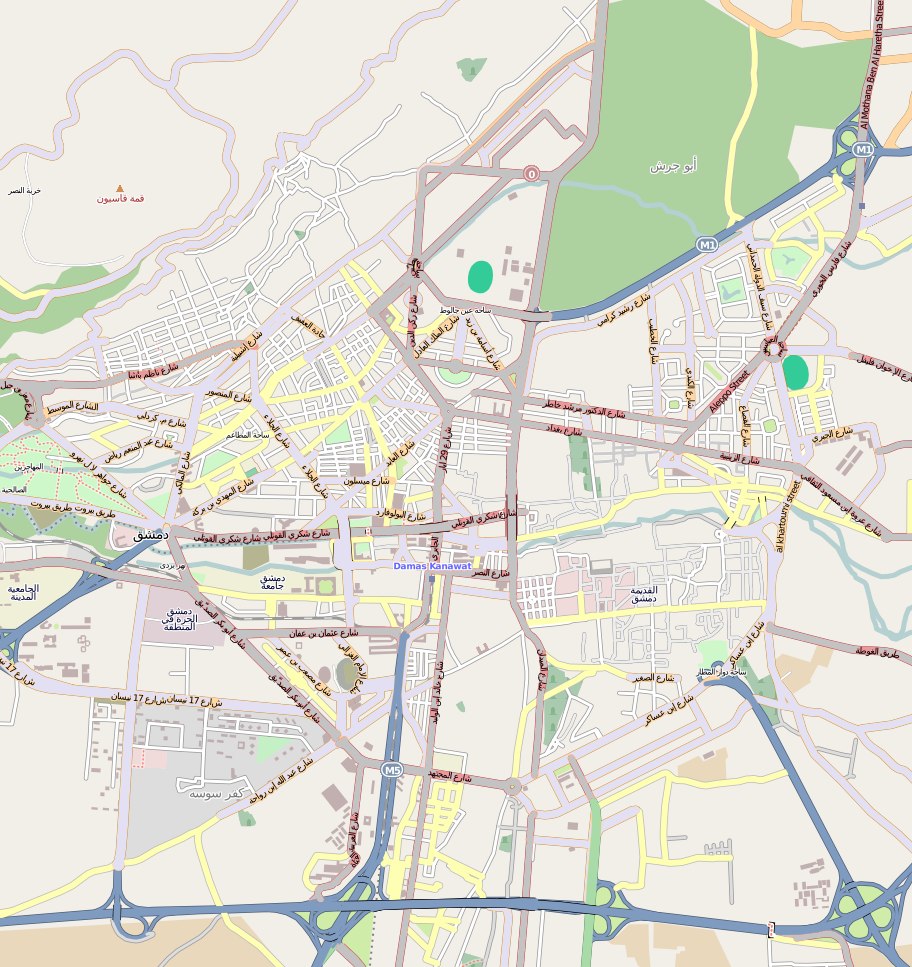
- Coordinates: 33.5128°N 36.2980°E

Construction
- Completion: Late 19th century

Marjeh Square (Arabic: ساحة المرجة, romanized: sāḥat al-Marjah), also known as "Martyrs' Square" (ساحة الشهداء sāḥat ash-Shuhadā’), is a square in central Damascus, Syria, just outside the walls of the old city. The Syrian Interior Ministry has its headquarters in the square.

== History ==
The square was built by the Ottomans in the late nineteenth century. A new post office and municipality were built there using steel and cement, new materials for Damascus at that time. The Ottomans publicly executed seven Syrian national activists in the square on Martyrs' Day, 6 May 1916, after which it became known as "Martyrs' Square". When the French took over Syria they continued to use the square for the same purpose. Fakhri Hassan al-Kharrat, son of the Great Syrian Revolt leader Hasan al-Kharrat, was hanged there in 1925–26. On 18 May 1965, Israeli spy Eli Cohen was publicly hanged in Marjeh Square.

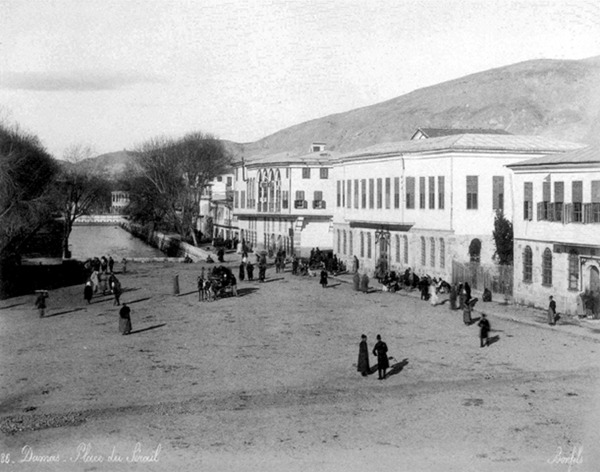
The Post Office building in Marjeh Square in 1890

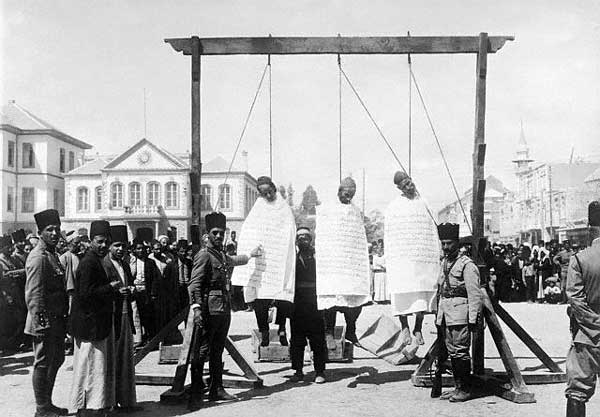
Public hanging in Marjeh Square during the Arab Revolt in 1916–1918

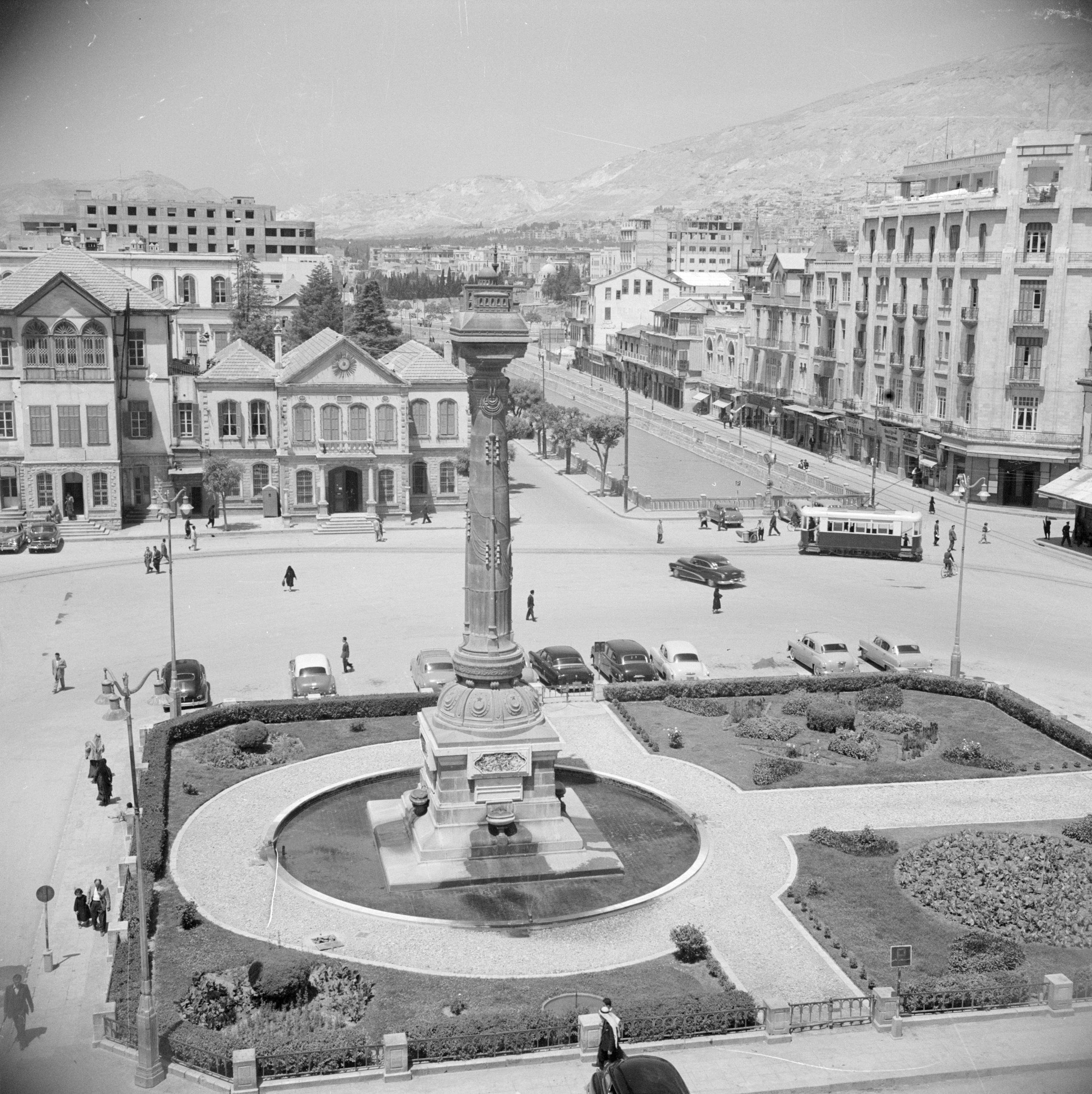
The Telegraph Column in 1950

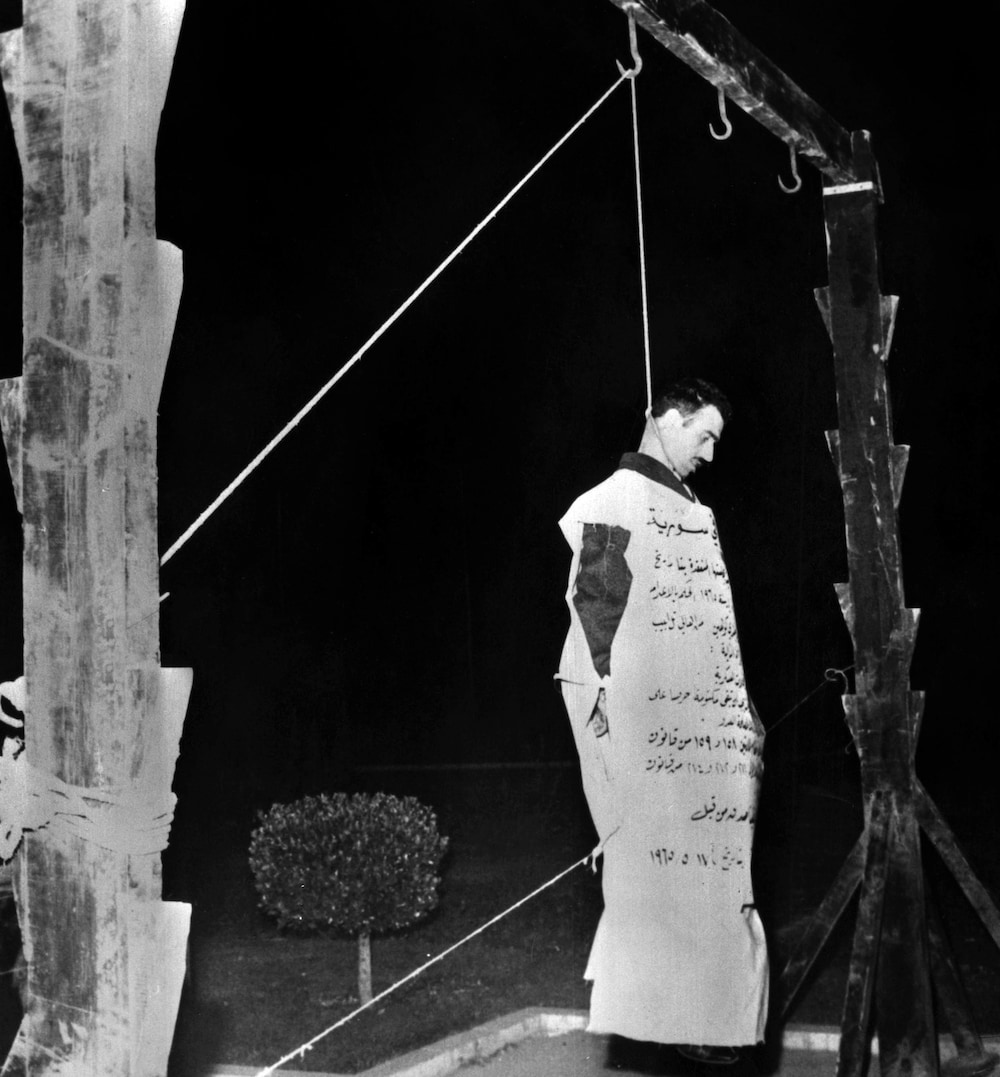
Eli Cohen publicly hanged in Marjeh Square on 18 May 1965

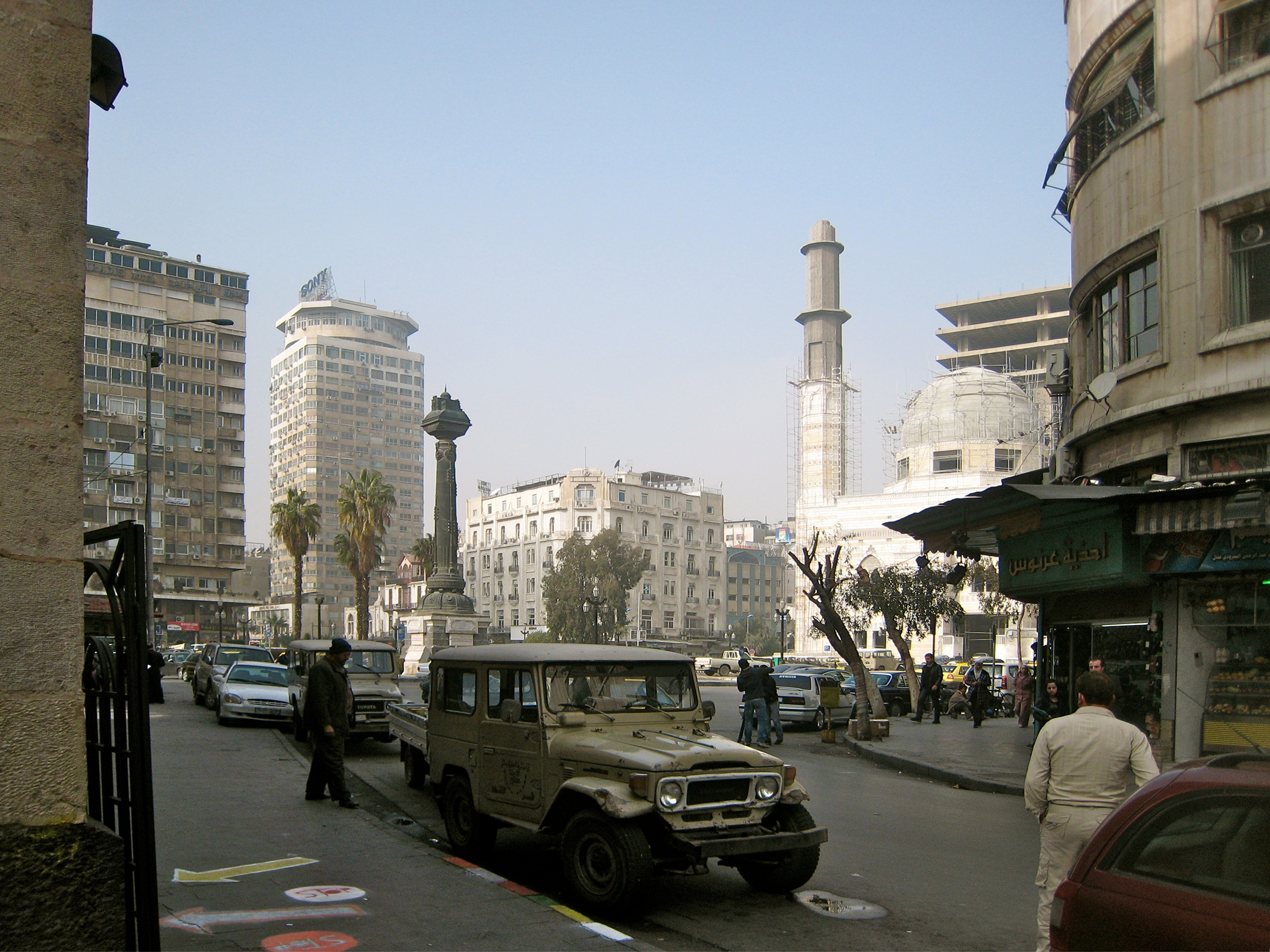
Marjeh Square in 2009
