= Al Qabas (newspaper) =

Newspaper in Syria (1913–1958)

- Type: Daily newspaper
- Founders: Shukri Al Asali; Muhammad Kurd Ali
- Founded: September 1913; 1920
- Ceased publication: 1916; 19 January 1958
- Political alignment: Arab nationalism
- Language: Arabic
- Headquarters: Damascus

Al Qabas (Arabic: القبس, lit. 'The Flash') is the title of two Arabic newspapers both of which were published in Damascus, Syria. The first one was in circulation between 1913 and 1916. The second one was published in the period 1920–1958 with some interruptions.

== Al Qabas (1913–1916) ==
The paper was launched by Shukri Al Asali in September 1913. Al Asali edited the paper until 1916 when he was executed.

== Al Qabas (1920–1958) ==
Muhammad Kurd Ali, a Syrian historian, established a paper entitled Al Muqtabas in Damascus in 1920. From 1928 the paper was renamed Al Qabas which was edited by Najib Al Rayyis, a Syrian journalist. It was published by Dimashq in Damascus. One of the frequent contributors was Munir Al Ajlani, a Syrian jurist.

Al Qabas was one of the publications supporting Arab nationalism and subject to frequent bans due to its radical and uncompromising political stance. The paper opposed to the idea of Greater Syria. During this period Al Qabas was close to the National Party. Najib Al Rayyis published anti-Semitic editorials in the paper. In an editorial he openly expressed his admiration and respect for the Nazi leader Adolf Hitler citing his determination and dominance over his opponents.

Al Qabas folded in 1952 when Najib Al Rayyis died, but soon it was restarted. However, this second period was not so long, and the last issue of the paper appeared on 19 January 1958.
