= List of University of Westminster alumni =

This is a list of alumni of the University of Westminster (including its predecessor institutions).

== Architecture and Urban Design ==
- Raymond Allchin archaeologist and cultural historian of ancient India
- Sir Thomas Bennett – architect (Saville Theatre, London Mormon Temple)
- Alfred Bossom – Conservative Party politician; architect (Magnolia Hotel)
- Ludo Campbell-Reid – urban designer (2004 Olympic Games)
- Gordon Cullen – architect; author (Townscape)
- Ralph Erskine – Swedish architect (Clare Hall, Cambridge)
- Stephen Gardiner - architect and writer
- John Harvey (1911–1997) – architectural historian
- Ron Herron – creator of the Walking City
- Jack Howe – architect and industrial designer
- Shiu-Kay Kan – architect, industrial and lighting designer
- Michael Manser– architect and past president of the Royal Institute of British Architects
- Ivan Margolius – author, architect and propagator of Czech culture and technology
- Peter Melvin - architect and vice-president Royal Institute of British Architects
- Vicky Richardson – editor of architecture and design magazine Blueprint
- Ian Ritchie – architect (Courtyard Theatre, Reina Sofia Museum of Modern Art)
- Fred Roche – architect and general manager of Milton Keynes Development Corporation
- Alireza Sagharchi – architect (New Quadrangle and Theatre for Magdalen College, Oxford; Kings Cross, London regeneration programme)
- Hamid Shirvani – President of California State University, Stanislaus
- Cameron Sinclair – co-founder of Architecture for Humanity
- Raglan Squire – British architect
- Michael Webb – founding member of Archigram
- Michael Wilford – architect (Lowry Centre, British Embassy in Berlin)
- Chris Wilkinson – architect (Gateshead Millennium Bridge, Magna Centre)

== Art ==
- Eileen Aldridge – painter and illustrator
- Anthea Alley – painter and sculptor
- Sybil Atteck – Trinidadian painter
- Norman Blamey – artist (Ordination, The Lavabo)
- Eden Box – artist
- John Frederick Brill – painter (creator of the Bardia Mural)
- Laurence Broderick – sculptor (The Bull, Birmingham Bullring)
- Sir Anthony Caro – sculptor (Dream City at the Yorkshire Sculpture Park, Black Cover Flat at the Tel Aviv Museum of Art)
- Richard Cullen – animator and music video director
- Leonard Daniels – painter and teacher
- Leslie Davenport - painter and teacher
- George Finey – Australian artist
- Dennis Flanders – artist and illustrator
- Fougasse – editor of Punch magazine
- Mark Gertler – portrait and landscape painter
- Thomas Hennell – painter and writer
- Usha Rani Hooja – Indian sculptor
- Jacobine Jones – sculptor (seven principal industries at the Bank of Canada Building, figures of scholar and hockey player at Kerr Hall, Ryerson University (now Toronto Metropolitan University))
- Charles Keeping – illustrator, children's author and lithographer (Les Misérables, Beowulf and various works by Charles Dickens)
- Constance-Anne Parker – sculptor
- Margot Perryman – artist
- John Ryan – animator and creator of Captain Pugwash
- Steve Sabella – Palestinian artist
- Flora Twort – painter
- Hester Wagstaff - artist, author and jeweller
- Melanie Walsh – children's book illustrator
- Barbara Warren – Irish painter

== Business ==
- Sinclair Beecham – co-founder of Pret à Manger
- Wilfred Cass – businessman and philanthropist
- Adekunle Ojora - business mogul and philanthropist
- Moorad Choudhry – Managing Director Royal Bank of Scotland plc
- Michael Jackson – Chairman, Universal Television Group USA
- Neil Laughton - former army officer, entrepreneur and adventurer
- Julian Metcalfe - co-founder of Pret a Manger
- Bejay Mulenga - businessman and creative consultant
- Adar Poonawalla - businessman and CEO of Serum Institute of India

== Fashion ==
- Claire Barrow - fashion designer and artist
- Christopher Bailey – Chief Executive and Chief Creative Officer (Burberry)
- Paolo Carzana – fashion designer
- Jeremy Laing – Canadian fashion designer; exchange student while studying fashion at Ryerson University (now Toronto Metropolitan University)
- Carri Mundane – fashion designer (Cassetteplaya)
- Stuart Vevers – fashion designer (Loewe)
- Vivienne Westwood – fashion designer
- Ashley Williams - fashion designer

== Film and television ==
- Stephen K Amos – comedian and TV presenter
- David Bonneville – screenwriter and director
- Charlie Brooker – BAFTA-nominated broadcaster
- Kristian Digby – presenter and director
- Andrew Dunn – BAFTA winning cinematographer
- Ruth England – newscaster and former presenter of Wish You Were Here...?
- Trisha Goddard – TV presenter/chat show host
- Darine Hamze – Lebanese actress and filmmaker
- Asif Kapadia – BAFTA winning filmmaker
- Aret Komlosy – singer
- John Lundberg – documentary filmmaker
- Sunshine Martyn – Big Brother 11 contestant
- Arthur Max – Oscar nominated and BAFTA winning art director
- Seamus McGarvey – cinematographer
- Stella Meghie – Canadian film director and screenwriter
- Trevor Miller – author and screenwriter
- Suleman Mirza – Signature dance group
- Jake Nava – music video and commercial director
- Carl Ng – Chinese/Hong Kong actor
- Perou – fashion photographer and judge of Make Me a Supermodel
- Rafi Pitts – Iranian film director
- Neal Purvis – scriptwriter (James Bond series including Die Another Day, Casino Royale and Quantum of Solace)
- Matt Richards – TV producer
- Georgia Toffolo – TV and media personality
- Anand Tucker – film director (Shopgirl, Leap Year)
- Stanley Unwin – comedian
- Danny Wallace – writer and presenter
- Timothy West – actor and director

== Government and politics ==
- Rafik Abdessalem – Minister of Foreign Affairs of Tunisia
- Ibikunle Amosun – Governor, Ogun State, Nigeria
- Janet Anderson – Labour Party Member of Parliament for Rossendale and Darwen
- Jean Arnault – United Nations Special Representative to Georgia
- Sir Robert Bellinger – Lord Mayor of London and director of Arsenal Football Club
- Katalin Bogyay – Hungarian Ambassador to UNESCO
- Harpal Brar – UK-based Indian communist
- Sir Bryan Cartledge – British diplomat and architect
- Asma Chaâbi - Mayor of Essaouira, Morocco
- Lynda Chalker, Baroness Chalker of Wallasey – Conservative politician
- Caroline Cox, Baroness Cox – politician, lobbyist
- Susan Cunliffe-Lister, Baroness Masham of Ilton – crossbencher and member of the House of Lords
- Keith Darvill – Labour Councillor and former MP for Upminster
- Jack Easter – Australian politician and Member of Parliament
- Natascha Engel – Labour Party MP for North East Derbyshire
- Christopher Fraser – Conservative Party politician and MP for South West Norfolk
- Dominic Grieve – Conservative MP for Beaconsfield and Attorney General for England and Wales
- Stephen Hesford – Labour Party MP for Wirral West
- Brian Hord – Conservative Party politician and Member of the European Parliament
- Ahmed Inaz – Minister of Finance and Treasury of Maldives
- Raheem Kassam - political activist and journalist
- Supinya Klangnarong – Thai media rights activist
- David Lepper – Labour Party MP for Brighton Pavilion
- Satyabrata Mookherjee – former Indian Union Minister of State
- Julian Morris – director of think-tank International Policy Network
- Geoff Mulgan – director of the Young Foundation
- Mohamed Nur – Former Mayor of Mogadishu
- Olabisi Onabanjo – Nigerian Governor
- Abdirahman Omar Osman – former Mayor of Mogadishu killed in 2019 by the armed group al-Shabaab
- Michael Otedola – Nigerian Governor
- Gloria de Piero – Labour MP for Ashfield
- Anand Ramlogan – human rights attorney
- Sir Anthony Seldon – political commentator
- Adin Talbar – former Deputy Director of the Israel Ministry for Commerce and Industry
- Azzam Tamimi – member of the Muslim Association of Britain
- Mark Versallion – Councillor and Treasurer for the Conservative Party
- Bowen Wells – Conservative MP for Hertford and Stortford
- Rosie Wrighting – Labour MP for Kettering
- Lilian Wolfe – anarchist and founding contributor to The Voice of Labour
- Paul Xuereb – President of Malta
- Stefán Jón Hafstein (Icelandic writer and statesman)
- Yang Cheng-wu-7th Magistrate of Kinmen County, member of the 9th Legislative Yuan
- Makram Mustafa Queisi- Former Jordanian Minister of Youth and Ambassador

== Law and legal practice ==
- Abiola Aderibigbe – British-Nigerian lawyer; advocate for a Nigerian Construction Act

== Literature ==
- Margery Allingham - author of Campion mysteries
- Mary Jo Bang – poet and Professor of English at Washington University in St. Louis
- George Barker – poet and author
- Samit Basu – author (The Simoqin Prophecies, The Manticore's Secret and The Unwaba Revelations)
- Quentin Crisp – writer and raconteur (Englishman in New York)
- Zee Edgell – author and professor of English at Kent State University
- David Gascoyne – poet
- Dorothy Hartley – social historian
- Mengistu Lemma – Ethiopian poet
- Siddharth Dhanvant Sanghvi – author
- Clive Sansom – poet, playwright and speech educator
- Philip Tew – Professor of English (post-1900 literature) Brunel University, novelist
- Dee Shulman, author

== Media and journalism ==
- Mo Abudu - media mogul, owner of EbonyLife TV
- Talal Al-Haj – New York bureau chief for the Al-Arabiya news network
- Nick Bright – BBC Radio 1Xtra presenter
- Mike Chaney, Today editor
- Will Cozens - Capital presenter
- William Frankel – former editor of the Jewish Chronicle
- Fran Godfrey – BBC Radio 2 newsreader
- Carrie Gracie – journalist and newsreader at BBC News
- Rose Hacker – journalist and sex educator
- Hsiao-Hung Pai – Taiwan-born journalist and author
- Denis Jenkinson – motor sport journalist
- James King – BBC film critic
- Riz Lateef - BBC journalist and news presenter
- Sarah Mukherjee – BBC's Environment Correspondent
- Annie Nightingale – BBC Radio 1 DJ
- Muyiwa Olarewaju - TV & Radio Broadcaster at Christian Broadcasting Network & Premier Christian Radio
- Michelle Olley – former deputy editor of Penthouse
- Ofeibea Quist-Arcton – National Public Radio foreign correspondent, journalist, broadcaster, and host
- Jon Ronson – journalist and author of The Men Who Stare At Goats
- Matt Smith – Sky News Entertainment Correspondent
- Brian Whitaker – former Middle East editor at The Guardian newspaper

== Music ==
- Amir Amor - member of drum and bass band Rudimental
- David Balfe – The Teardrop Explodes and founder of Zoo Records
- Banks & Wag – TV composers (The X Factor, ZingZillas, Ross Noble) and musicians
- Einar Örn Benediktsson – member of Icelandic anarcho-punk group KUKL
- Luke Busby – producer Temposhark
- Alex Cartañá – Spanish singer/songwriter/actress
- Robert Diament – singer/songwriter Temposhark
- Henry's Final Dream – indie rock band; all members studied at the University
- Jono Grant - One Third of London-based trance trio Above & Beyond and founder of UK Label Anjunabeats
- Richard Jones, Ciaran Jeremiah, Kevin Jeremiah & Paul Stewart – members of pop group The Feeling
- Nick Mason – musician, member of rock group Pink Floyd
- Jake Nava – music and advertising director
- Pure Reason Revolution – progressive rock band
- William G. Shields – English rapper better known as Jehst
- Al Shux – producer of the Jay-Z hit song "Empire State of Mind"
- Mumzy Stranger – British singer, rapper, producer and writer
- Simon Toulson-Clarke – lead singer of pop-group Red Box
- Roger Waters – musician and lyricist of rock group Pink Floyd
- Charlie Watts – musician, member of The Rolling Stones
- Rick Wright – musician, member of rock group Pink Floyd

== Photography ==
- Arnis Balcus - photographer; video artist
- Stuart Roy Clarke – photographer, known for his major work The Homes Of Football
- Iain Macmillan – photographer (cover of The Beatles' Abbey Road album)
- Scarlet Page – photographer and daughter of Led Zeppelin guitarist Jimmy Page
- Olivier Richon – photographer and Professor of Photography at the Royal College of Art
- Jo Spence – photographer, known for the documentation of her struggle with cancer

== Science and engineering ==
- Frederick Abel – chemist and inventor of cordite
- Seweryn Chomet – physicist
- Sir Diarmuid Downs – former President of the Institution of Mechanical Engineers
- Lewis R. B. Elton – physicist and researcher in education
- Mary English – mycologist and historian
- Sir Alexander Fleming – Nobel Prize in Medicine
- H. J. Gough – former President of the Institution of Mechanical Engineers
- George Hockham – engineer and pioneer in research for fiber-optics
- David Lewis – psychologist
- Gerald Palmer – British car design engineer
- Walter Eric Spear – physicist and pioneer of thin film displays
- Armand de Waele – British chemist and rheologist

== Sports ==
- Lambros Athanassoulas – Greek rally driver
- Colin Charvis – rugby player and captain of the Welsh national rugby team
- Herbert Gayler - Olympic cyclist and 12 hour record holder
- Dunia Susi – England women's football player
- Frank Turner - three-times Olympic gymnast

== Miscellaneous ==
- Henry Allingham – supercentenarian and World War I veteran
- A. E. Bassom – pioneer of traffic policing
- Shirley Becke - commander of London Metropolitan Police's A4 Branch (Women Police), first woman officer in United Kingdom to reach chief officer rank.
- Stephen Geoffrey Cottrell – Archbishop of York
- Mladen Dolar – Slovenian philosopher
- Lucy Bella Earl – teacher of English, YouTuber
- Mohammed Emwazi – militant jihadist
- Princess Aisha bint Faisal – Jordanian princess
- Maurice Grosse – paranormal investigator
- Simmon Latutin – awarded George Cross for bravery during World War II
- Tengku Muhammad Fakhry Petra – Malaysian Kelantanese prince
- Allyson Williams - midwife
