= The Parachute Paradox =

2016 memoir by Steve Sabella

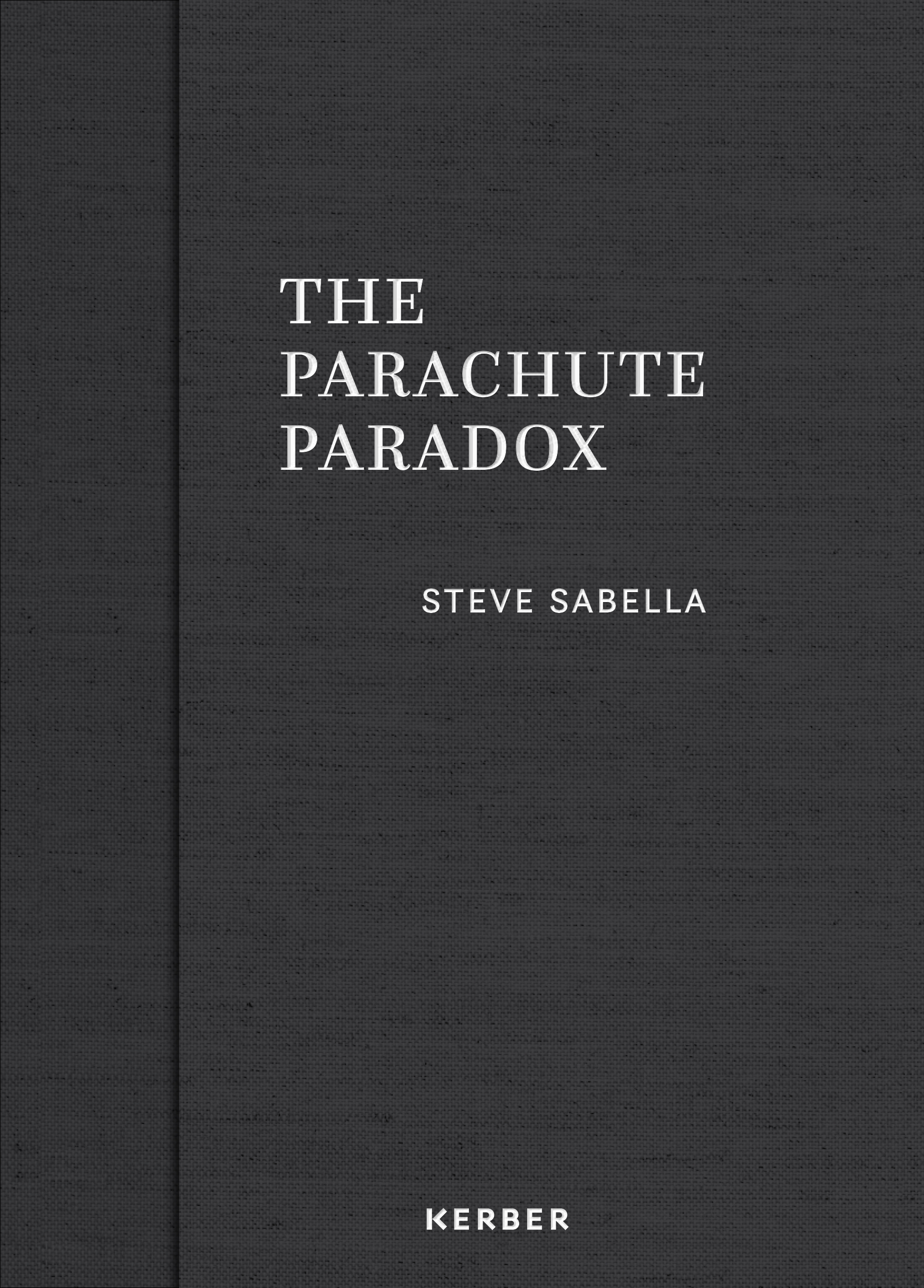
- Cover
- Author: Steve Sabella
- Language: English
- Genre: Memoir
- Publisher: Kerber Verlag
- Publication date: September 2016
- Publication place: Germany
- Pages: 304 pp
- ISBN: 978-3-7356-0305-0
- OCLC: 961156303

The Parachute Paradox is a memoir by the artist Steve Sabella, published in September 2016 by Kerber Verlag. It details Sabella's upbringing in Jerusalem under Israeli occupation, his subsequent nomadism, and the development of his art practice as a means of mental emancipation from the colonisation of the imagination.

The London-based newspaper Al-Araby Al-Jadeed stated, "The Parachute Paradox…proposes a subject that is unprecedented in Palestinian literature: the liberation of the self and the homeland through the liberation of the imagination."

== Emerging themes ==
=== The Israeli occupation of Palestine ===
Throughout the memoir, Sabella wrote on the psychic and physical effects of living in an occupied Palestine. The book’s title metaphors the Israeli occupation, referring to a tandem skydive jump Sabella took in Haifa.

I felt light, less burdened by what was happening below. I felt identity-less, free from all the labels and classifications, free from all the racism and discrimination, free from the Israeli occupation I was born into. But I didn’t open the parachute. I was in a tandem jump, attached to an Israeli… Life under occupation is like the reality of a Palestinian attached to an Israeli in a tandem jump. There is an Israeli on the back of every Palestinian, controlling all aspects of life—the Israeli is always in control. This impossible reality places the Palestinian under constant threat, in a never-ending hostage situation.

=== Colonization of the imagination ===
Sabella identifies the Israeli occupation as affecting both the bodily and mental lives of Palestinians. With Israel’s constant military presence, the establishment of checkpoints and barriers, and the construction of settlements, he finds that Palestinian reality has become fragmented and entrapped in a seemingly eternal condition:

… Palestinians reached a point where they were no longer able to imagine that they could live in freedom. The colonization on Palestinian land was obvious, but what was hidden was the colonization of the imagination.

Wars proved long ago that conquering the world is impossible, but today it’s still possible to conquer the collective consciousness—we live in an era of the colonization of the imagination.

=== Exile and global citizenship ===
Leaving Jerusalem for London in 2007 and then Berlin in 2010, Sabella writes about life in exile—a state experienced both at home, as a Palestinian living under occupation, and abroad:

I was neither here nor there, not in Jerusalem, nor in London. I was in no space. London injected me with an extra dose of alienation, stronger than the ones I’d received in Jerusalem, making me feel more and more out of place. I was going through a process of self-construction. Hermits sought the desert, not to find identity but to lose it. I decided to lose mine, in search of a new one, true only to me. But I became a stranger to myself—lost in my mental wilderness.

I shook my camera like a mad man, like prisoners are shaken during a brutal interrogation. The movement created blurry images, as if the universe was collapsing in on itself, disintegrating… defying perception and reality. I had been injected with adrenaline, blood flowing through my veins, struck by lightning over and over again, in an erratic state of euphoria. This spark altered my consciousness, and made me aware of the possibility of change. But to become more malleable I would have to break my bones, crush them, to allow a new self to emerge. I looked to the sky and was finally able to plant my roots in the clouds, to always remain in transition.

=== Identity ===
Sabella explains that his identity is based on his understanding of the world, rather than his religion, ethnicity, or nationality. He says of identity:

It cannot be defined by words on paper—and words on paper never defined mine. My true identity was made up of my personal views and thoughts about life, nurtured by observing its details. I never saw my identity as a label, but as a process—fluid, changing everyday. Maybe this explained why I struggled when people asked me where I came from, expecting a direct answer relating to a geographic location. I wanted my answer to be true to what I felt. But in the process of not referring to labels, I became a stranger to myself, finding it difficult to relate to identity with words.

=== Liberation ===
Sabella argues for the necessity of a personal, mental liberation from systemic oppression instead of one that is solely based on political and social change.

I found a life between euphoria and melancholia, between exile and home. I am the only one who can be the source of my energy. As a child, I pointed a flashlight into the well of my Old City house. Today, I look into the dark well of my life and see my own light mirrored back. every time I fall into the darkness—my darkness—I remind myself that liberation comes through the search for inner light.

== Awards ==
The Parachute Paradox won the 2016 Nautilus Book Awards for best memoir. The book was also a finalist for The International Book Awards.

== Reception and media coverage ==
=== General commentary ===
Referring to The Parachute Paradox as "this captivating black book," the philosopher, curator, and writer Almut Shulamit Bruckstein Çoruh stated: "The artist teaches us ways of escape from the deadlocks of visual codes inspired by the power of the imagination…The Parachute Paradox is therefore also a book about the transformation of the self, about freedom, about liberating the image of Jerusalem from her ideological confinement, about the power of love, and about the artistic imagination breaking free."

In the newspaper Al Khaleej, the novelist, poet, and critic Mohammed Al-Assad wrote of The Parachute Paradox:

What is identity? Is it assigned through words? Are they the labels we are born into and continue on living under in their shadows? The current Palestinian answer was proposed by the experiences of Edward Said who said that identity has a fluid nature––it does not settle, or rather it should not settle. He described it as whatever the person wants it to be, subject to constant change. But Steve adds new meaning in his book, derived from his life in exiled Jerusalem, and then in exile in London and Berlin, where he now lives. His multiplicitous identity arose from where he was born amongst standardized labels, from family, to community and the wider homeland. Steve doesn't state that he is with the case of his nation, exposed to all kinds of uprooting from the self and the land. This is a given, unarguable. But, and this is more important, he is for justice—in any time and any place. Here, the artist rises to an identity that he starts to embroider with threads of what he sees, knows and learns.

The Palestinian activist Hanan Debwania wrote:

Sabella is more than a voice for Palestinians; he is a spokesman for humanity, for his struggle of growing up in Jerusalem under occupation was a struggle not only for civil rights, but for human rights…I always say if someone wants to feel occupation, he or she must visit the ghost city of Hebron. Now I would say that if anyone wants to feel what it means for a human to be occupied, they must read The Parachute Paradox.

=== Features and excerpts ===
The art journal Protocollum published the eighth chapter of The Parachute Paradox while Sabella was writing the book. The same month it was published, Al-Araby Al-Jadeed published the book's prologue, translated by Mohammed Al-Assad. Following its publication, the memoir gained attention and esteem, reviewed in numerous international publications. NPR Berlin ran a two-episode feature on the memoir in their Life in Berlin program. For their issue titled "Future Visions for Jerusalem," the Palestine-Israel Journal also published an excerpt.

=== Reviews and interviews ===
New books [on the Israel-Palestine conflict] tend follow the same patterns in terms of approach, construction and content. An in-depth history of one stage of the conflict, a compelling argument to achieve peace or, perhaps, a convincing strategy to challenge the status quo. On rare occasions, an original narrative of the conflict, imbued with honesty and sensitivity, is published.

— The National

When asked, "What do you hope to accomplish by publishing this book?", Steve Sabella responded "…With this book in particular, it seems to target Palestine and Israel and calls for the end of the brutal occupation. It also deals with the reality that we all live under systems that dictate to us how to live, think and even imagine. I want everyone who reads it to feel that our imaginations are free. I want them to consider what I’m convinced of today, that imagination and reality are two sides of the same coin, and that we create our own realities.

— Selections

The Parachute Paradox is perhaps the most impressive book I've ever read on the Palestinian-Jewish conflict. A good book to read and to go through gently, piece by piece.

— Moors Magazine

Sabella is arguably the perfect protagonist: his art and writing are at once very personal as well as political and universal; his monologues are passionate, while leaving room for question marks.

— Spitz Magazine

== Book launches ==
- Contemporary Art Platform, Kuwait City, Kuwait. October 5, 2016.

Reading and conversation with Sabella and the writer, poet and critic Mohammed al-Assad.

- Institute of Critical Inquiry (ICI), Berlin, Germany. October 18, 2016.

Reading and discussion with Sabella, director of ifa-Galerie Alya Sebti, and founder of Taswir Projects Dr. Almút Sh. Bruckstein.

- Alserkal Avenue, Dubai, UAE. November 13, 2016.

Reading and conversation with Sabella and Editor-in-chief of Harper’s Bazaar Art Arabia Rebecca Anne Proctor; in collaboration with Barjeel Art Foundation

- School of Oriental and African Studies, University of London, London, UK. November 21, 2016.

Reading and conversation with Dr. Siba Aldabbagh and Professor Wen-Chin Ouyang.

== Design ==
The first edition of The Parachute Paradox was printed in a limited edition of 1,250 copies, in addition to 150 artist proofs, and 100 for media. The pages are bound in a Swiss brochure style, with a folding, double hard cover and an exposed spine.

The book's material concept was conceived by Sabella, and its design was carried out by Verlena Gerlach.

== Image gallery ==
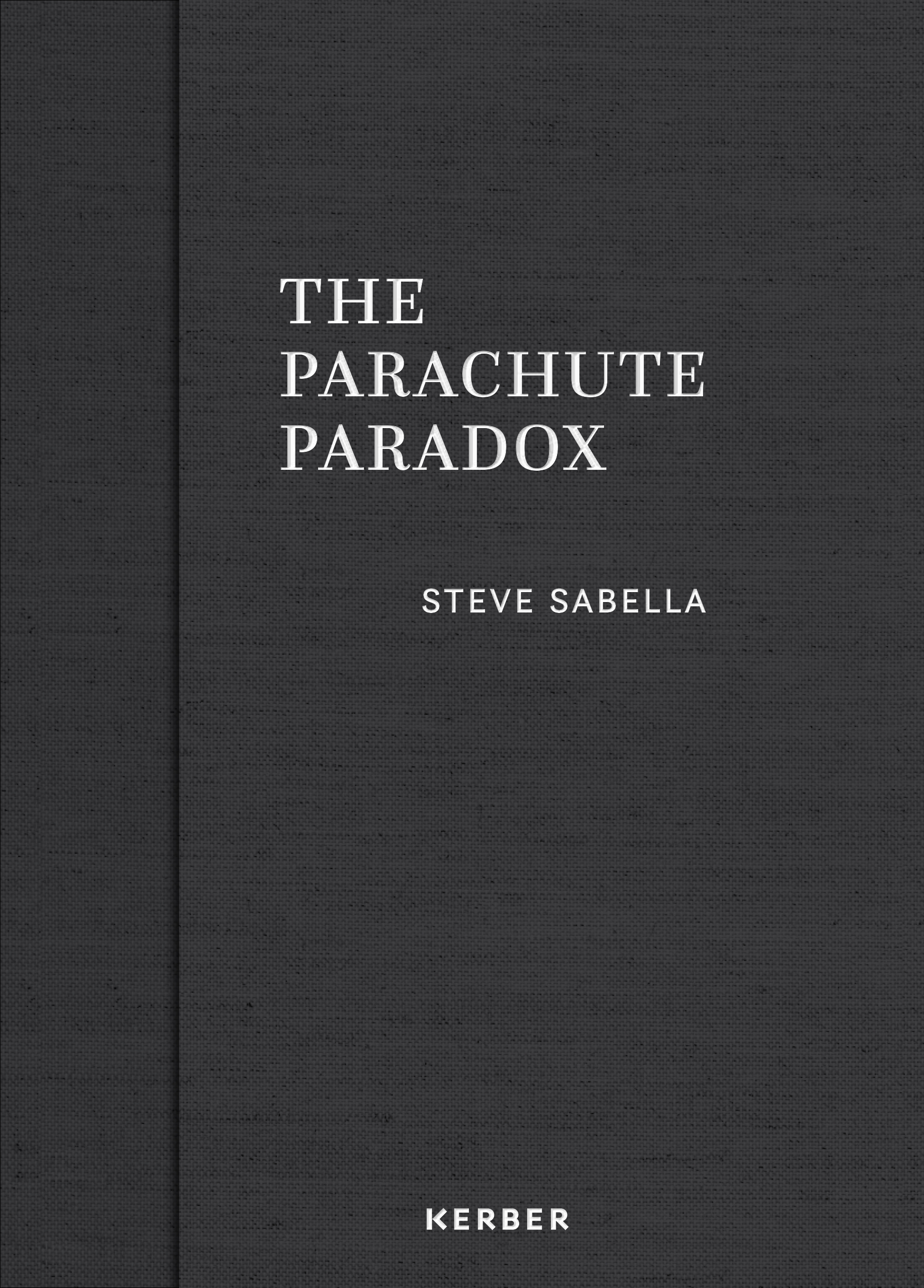

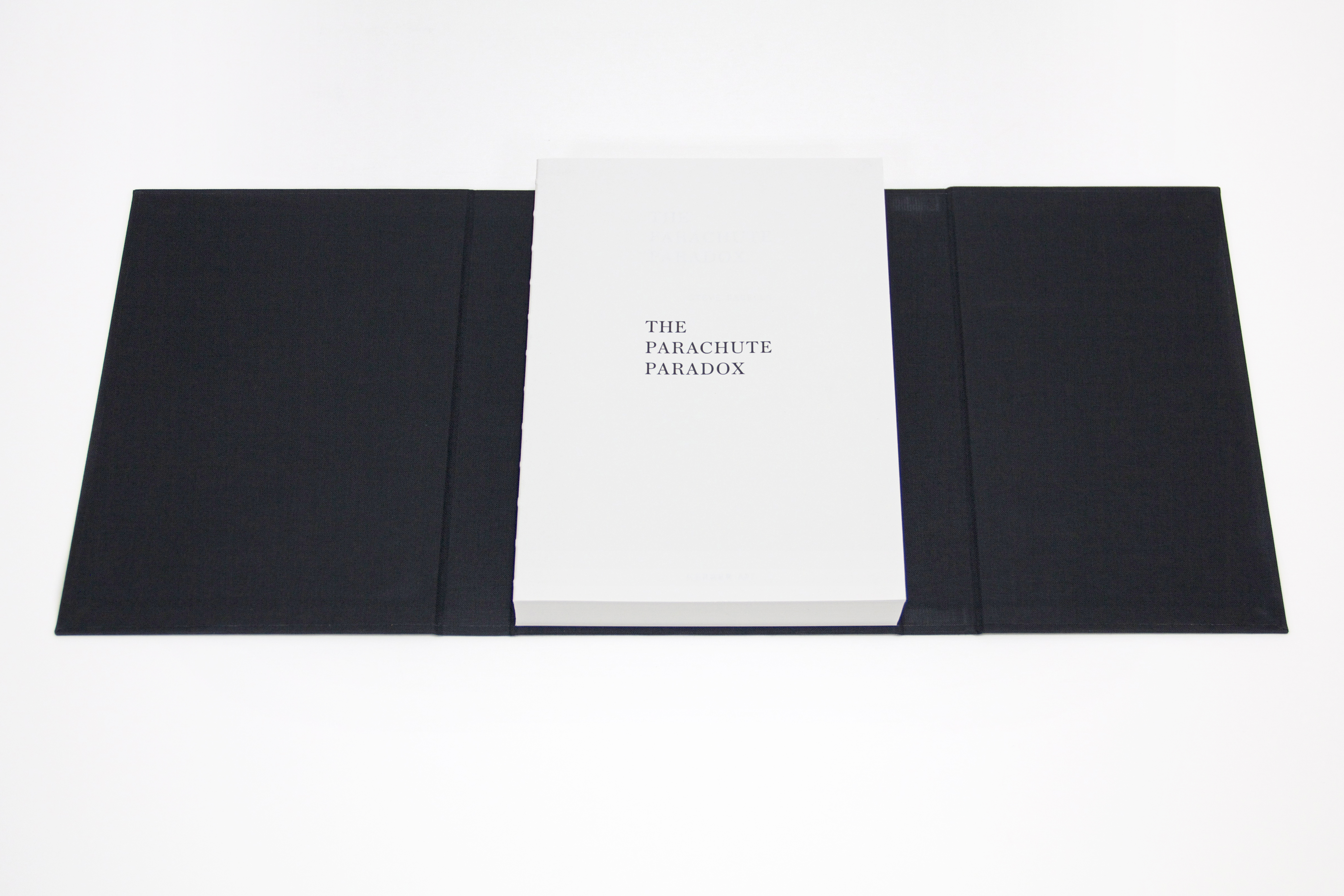

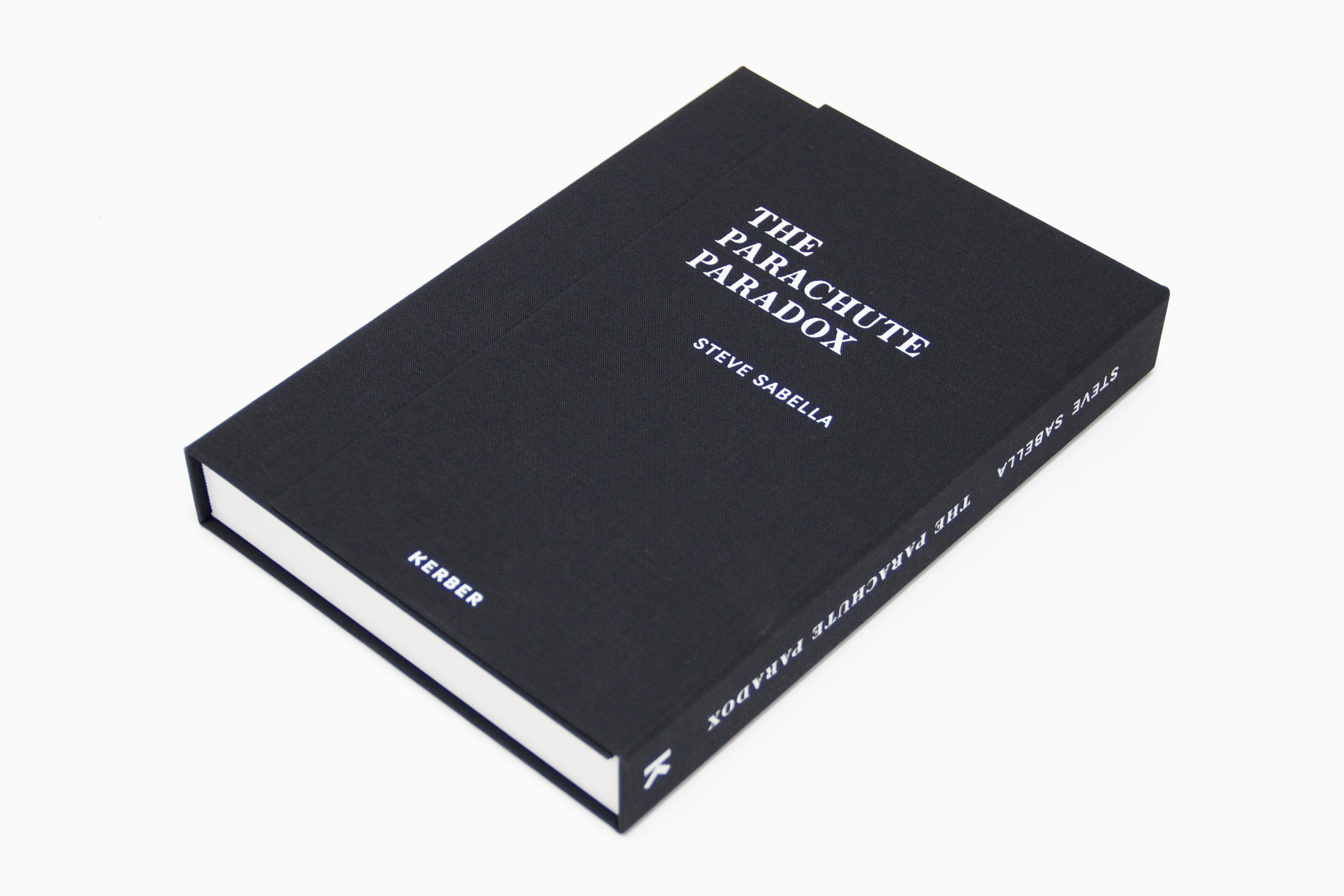

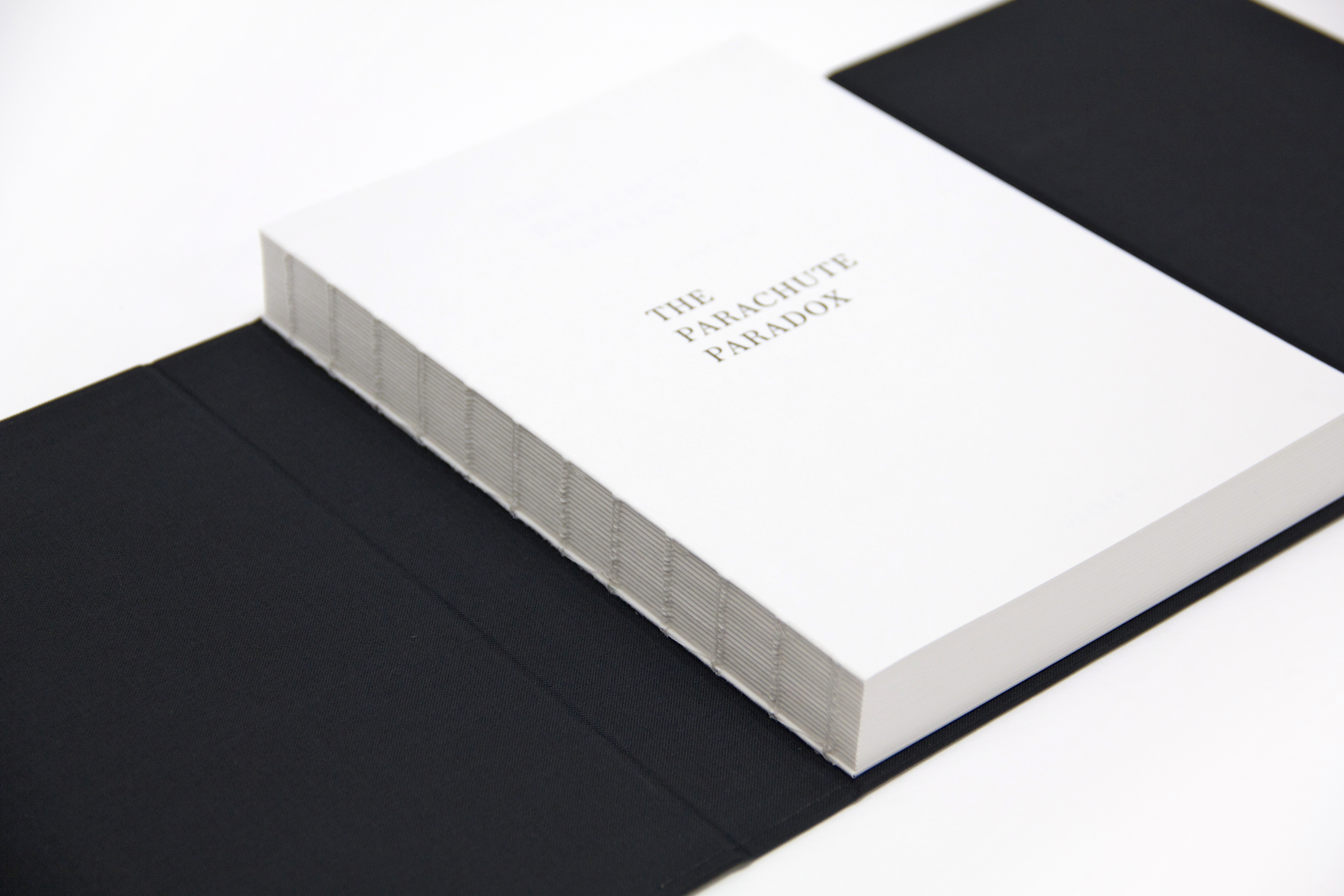

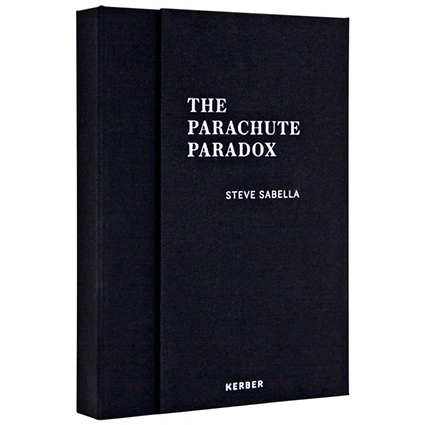

== See also ==
- Palestinian art
- Palestinian literature
- Akademie der Künste
- Kamal Boullata
- List of University of Westminster alumni
- Mathaf: Arab Museum of Modern Art
