= Steve Sabella =

Palestinian artist

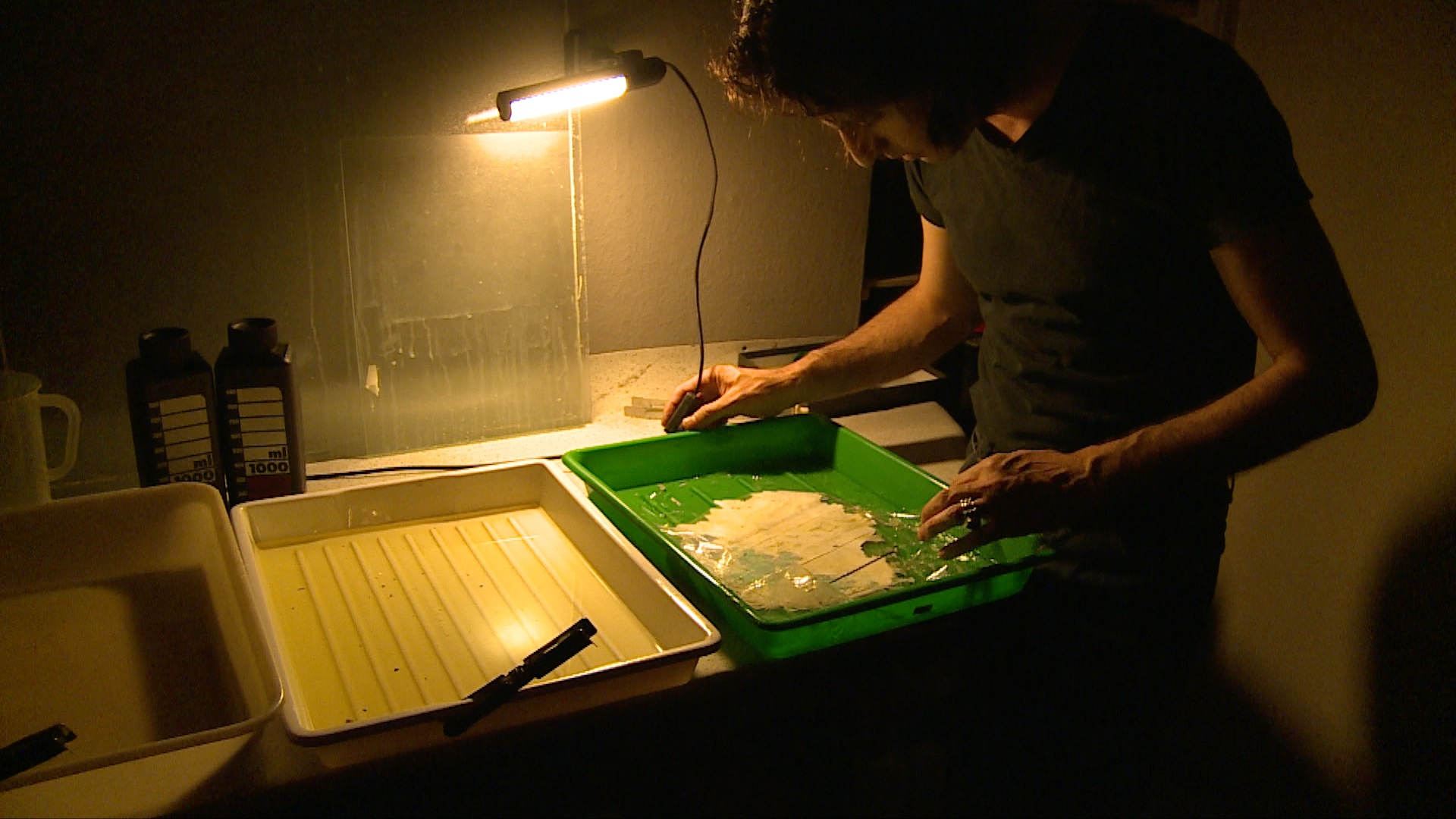
- Photograph of Steve Sabella in a darkroom
- Born: 19 May 1975 (age 51); Jerusalem, Israel
- Education: Jerusalem School of Photography (Musrara); State University of New York; University of Westminster; Sotheby’s Institute of Art
- Occupations: Visual artist; photographer; author; educator
- Known for: Photography; collage; visual arts; installation; writing; lecturing; postcolonial themes
- Notable work: Settlement: Six Israelis & One Palestinian; 38 Days of Re-Collection; The Great March of Return; The Parachute Paradox; The Artist’s Curse
- Awards: Ellen-Auerbach-Stipendium for Photography (Akademie der Künste, 2008); Nautilus Book Award (2016) & Eric Hoffer Award (2017) for best memoir; Silver Nautilus Award (2024) for The Artist's Curse
- Website: stevesabella.space

Steve Sabella (Arabic: ستيف سابيلا) (born 19 May 1975 in Jerusalem) is a Palestinian visual artist, author, and educator based in Berlin. He works primarily with photography, collage, and installation. He is the author of the memoir The Parachute Paradox: Decolonizing the Imagination, first published by Kerber Verlag in 2016, and The Artist's Curse (Emaginity, 2023).

Rather than using photography only to document reality, Sabella treats the image as a site of excavation, where memory, place and history are constructed. A related concern in his writing is the liberated image, photography released from conventional function and used to construct new visual realities. His work has been discussed in relation to the genealogy and archaeology of the image, and to themes of identity and exile, including what Sabella has called the "colonization of the imagination."

Sabella was among the artists commissioned for Mathaf: Arab Museum of Modern Art's inaugural exhibition Told/Untold/Retold (2010–11). He has shown his work internationally at institutions and exhibitions including the British Museum, the 1st Biennial of Arab Photography (Maison Européenne de la Photographie and the Institut du Monde Arabe, Paris), Les Rencontres d'Arles, FotoFest Houston, and the International Center for Photography Scavi Scaligeri (Verona), which presented a retrospective of his work in 2014.

In 2008, he received the Ellen-Auerbach-Fellowship for Photography from the Akademie der Künste (Berlin); recipients are selected by nomination and jury. In 2014, Hatje Cantz and the Akademie der Künste (Berlin) published his monograph Steve Sabella – Photography 1997–2014, which includes texts by Hubertus von Amelunxen and Kamal Boullata.

== Early career and education ==
Sabella studied art photography at the Musrara School of Photography in Jerusalem, graduating in 1997. He later completed a BA in Visual Studies at the State University of New York, followed by an MA in Photographic Studies at the University of Westminster and an MA in Art Business at Sotheby’s Institute of Art.

While based in Jerusalem, he worked as an artist and as a commissioned photographer for international organisations, including UNICEF, UNRWA and the United Nations Development Programme (UNDP). In July 2005, UNDP officials identified Sabella and an Australian colleague as two contractors abducted in Gaza; both were released unharmed after about three hours.

Sabella moved to London in 2007 and relocated to Berlin in 2010, where he is based.

In 2024 and 2026, Sabella taught the elective course The Art Practice | From Vision to Action for BA and MA music students at the Barenboim–Said Akademie in Berlin.

== Visual art ==
Sabella works with large-scale photography, photographic collage, and mixed media. Across these formats, he has described his visual works as a form of research into the genealogy of the image. In his writing and interviews, he has contrasted his approach with documentary notions of photographic indexicality, arguing that photographic images can construct their own realities. He has also linked the production of such “alternative realities” to political questions, suggesting that images can shape the collective imagination, including in relation to Israel’s occupation of Palestine. Writers on Sabella’s work have described it through the language of visual archaeology and palimpsest, linking his use of fragments and layered images to memory, displacement, and the formation of identity.

== Recurring themes in Sabella's work ==
Critical writing on Sabella’s practice has discussed the relationship between image and memory, and has often addressed themes of displacement, exile, and the politics of representation. Commentators have described works such as 38 Days of Re-Collection as layered constructions in which walls, fragments, and photographic imagery function as material traces of lived history.

=== Visual archaeology ===
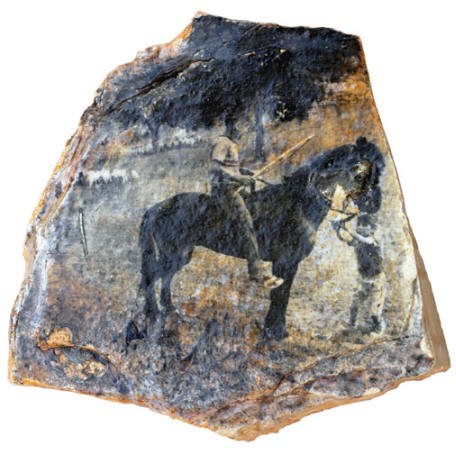
Till the End (2004)

Throughout his practice, Sabella has produced works that examine how visual history is constructed and how images participate in that process. Writers have frequently discussed his method through the language of archaeology, treating images as sites to be excavated rather than transparent records. In some works, Sabella builds images through processes of layering and revision; in others, photographs are presented as objects—for example, by printing black-and-white photo emulsion on Jerusalem stone or by transferring images onto fragments of scraped wall paint. In the series 38 Days of Re-Collection, photographs are printed onto paint fragments scraped from walls in Jerusalem’s Old City; Ella Shohat describes the scraping as “an act of excavation of the buried substrata of forgotten lives,” and as a way to “visualise lives once again intermingled." Independent curator Nat Muller described 38 Days of Re-Collection as making Sabella "a time capsule mediating the temporal limbo of the Palestinian condition."

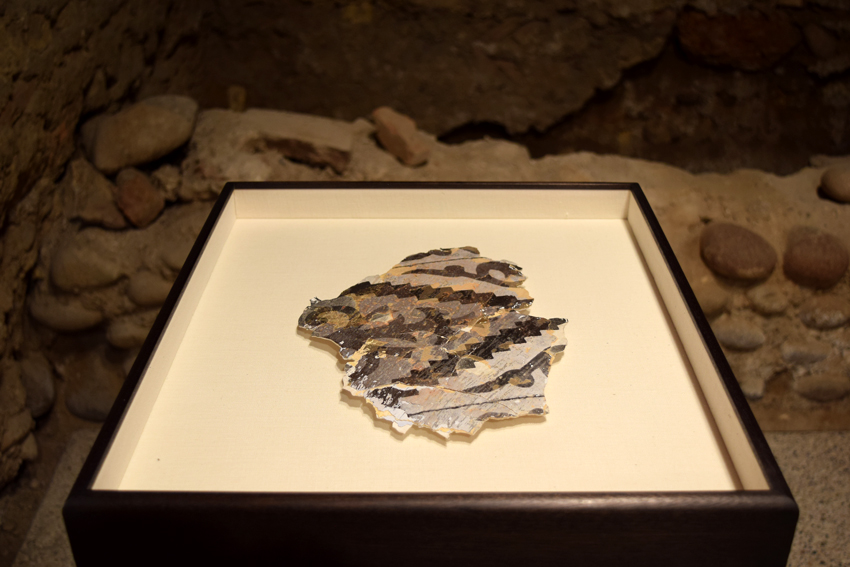
38 Days of Re-Collection (2014) (installation view), at International Center for Photography Scavi Scaligeri, Verona, Italy

=== Exile, the Palestinian experience and the colonization of the imagination ===
Critics of Sabella's work have often noted and discussed the themes of exile and the Palestinian experience. Artworks like Settlement - Six Israelis & One Palestinian and 38 Days of Re-Collection engage more directly with Sabella's birthplace in their content and media, but the themes of diaspora and occupation are also suggested by the titles of his series such as In Exile and Independence.

Arts writer Myrna Ayad wrote that “it is his name which instantly displaces him,” and added that “whereas Sabella’s name may mislead, the titles of his artworks do not.”

In a 2014 statement, Sabella argued that imagination is central to self-determination, describing a “colonization of the imagination” as a condition that must be resisted at the level of the individual.

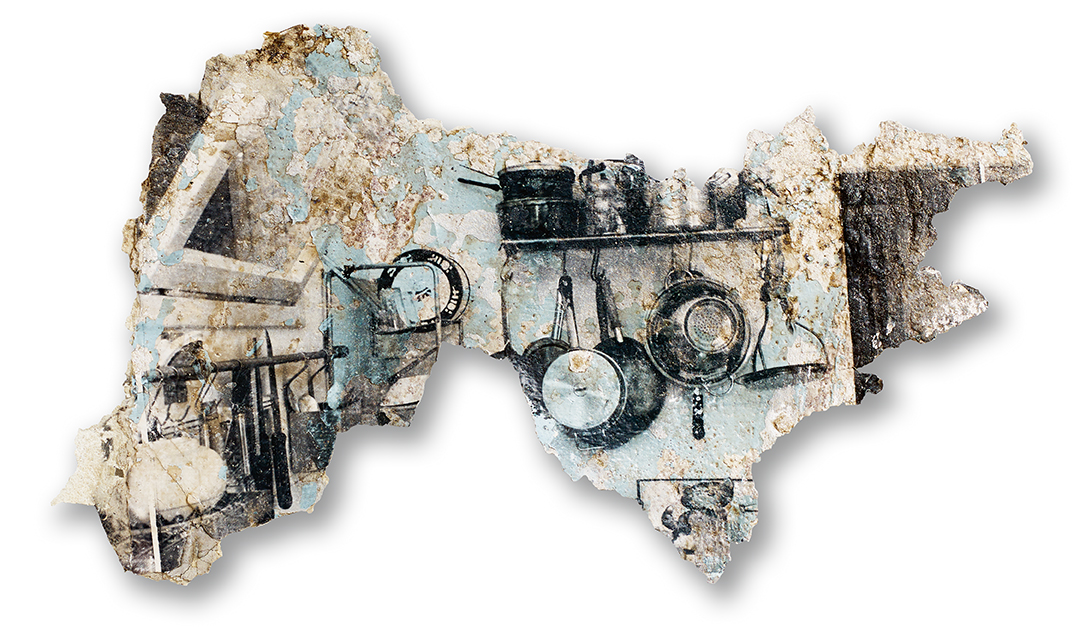
38 Days of Re-Collection (2014)

In the artist’s monograph, Hubertus von Amelunxen wrote that Sabella “chose exile,” and that his work confronts exile “in its distorting and destructive consequences,” describing Sabella’s art as “an art of understanding… [that] forms a bridge — it is the bridge.”

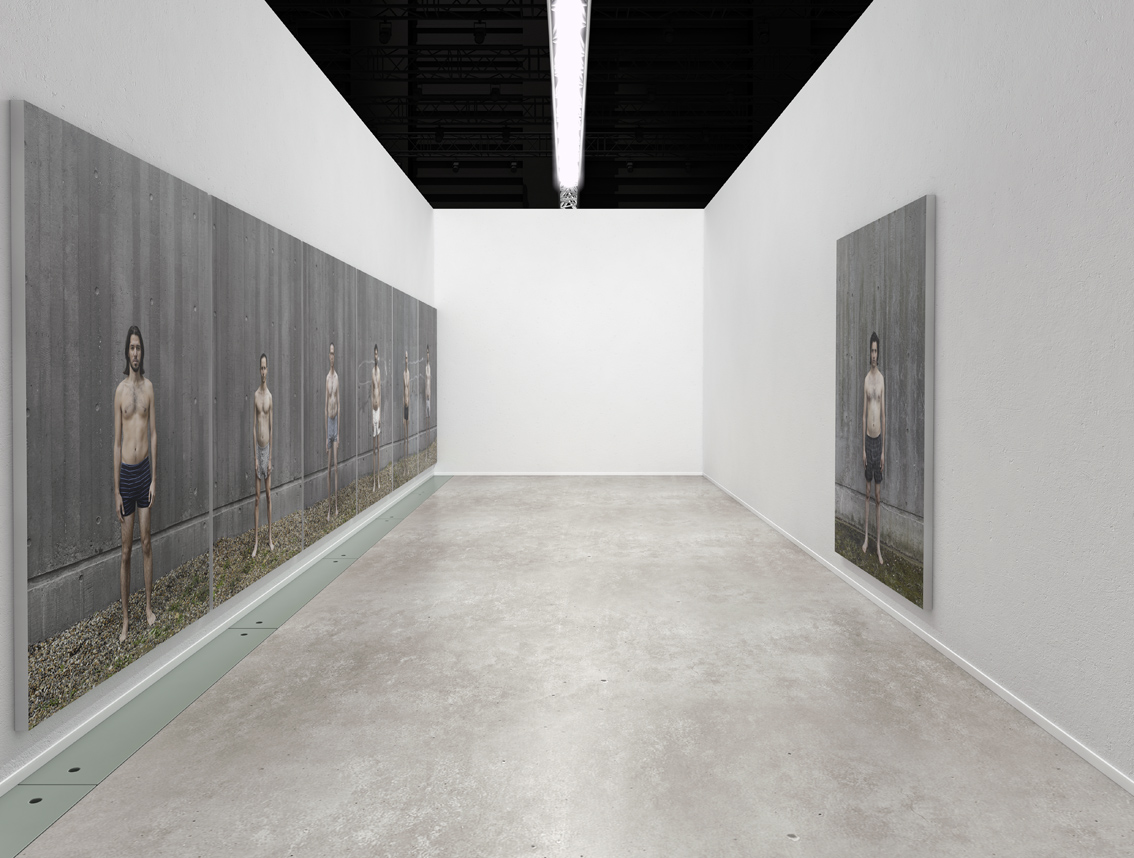
Settlement - Six Israelis & One Palestinian (2010) (installation view), at Mathaf: Arab Museum of Modern Art, Doha, Qatar

=== Experimentation of the photographic medium ===
Since the beginning of his career, Sabella has experimented with the photographic medium across different formats and materials. His early series Search (1997) was shot on infrared film, while later works such as Kan Yama Kan (2005) and Settlement – Six Israelis & One Palestinian (2008–2010) reconfigure photographs within installation-based presentation. He has also produced works in which photographs are printed on nontraditional supports, including stone from Jerusalem and fragments of peeling wall paint. In the foreword to Steve Sabella: Photography 1997–2014, Kamal Boullata wrote that Sabella has been “using his camera as a painter uses his brush,” and concluded that the images are “a dream to discover.”

=== Musicality ===
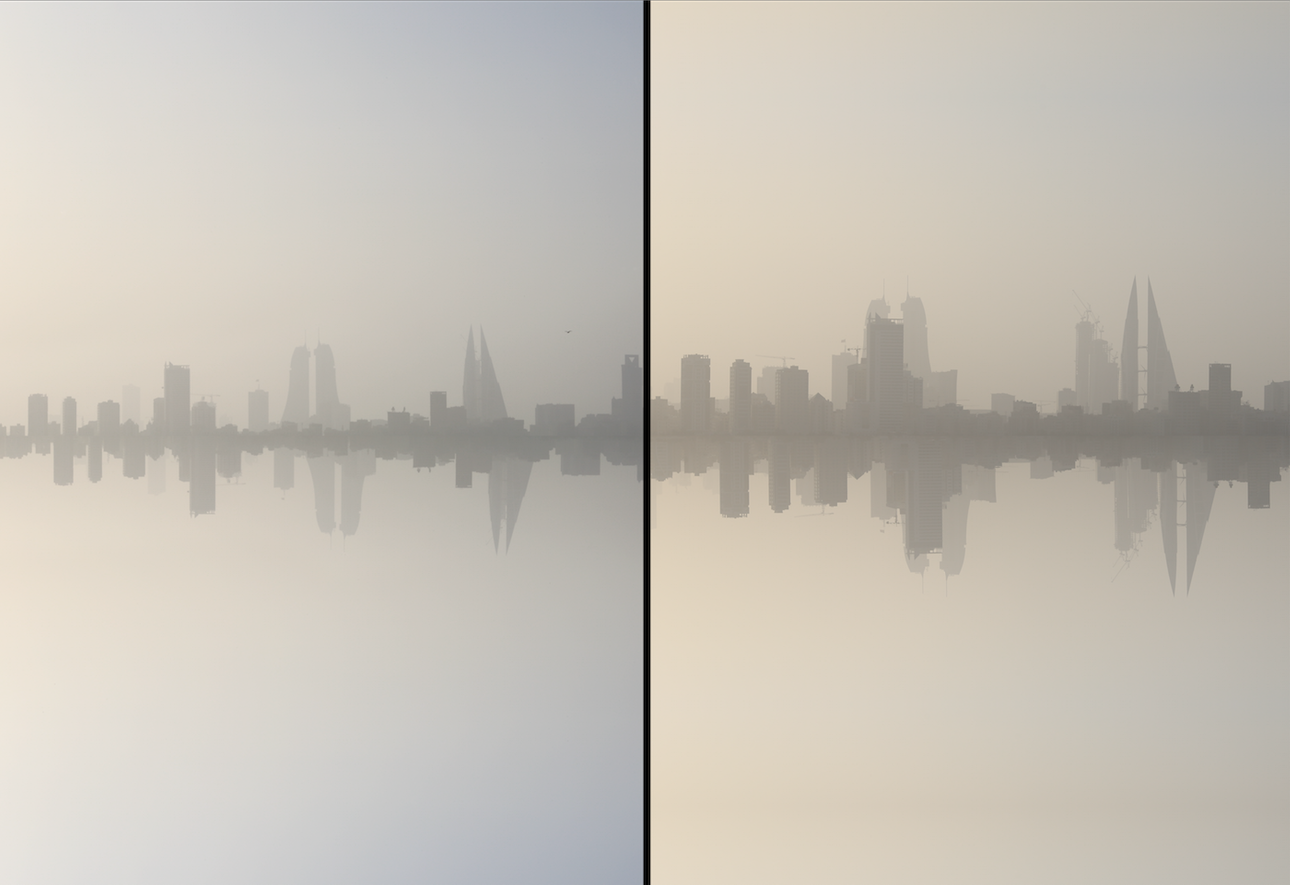
Sinopia (detail) (2014) by Steve Sabella

In Steve Sabella – Photography 1997–2014, art historian Hubertus von Amelunxen relates musical concepts to Sabella’s photo-collage practice, drawing in particular on the notion of counterpoint. Writing on Sinopia—a collage of photographs of the skyline of Manama, Bahrain—von Amelunxen describes the city’s mirrored axis and the skyline’s “reverberat[ion] at different pitches,” suggesting that visual repetition can produce a “sound pattern.”

Sabella has also collaborated with musicians: in 2014, he commissioned the jazz ensemble The Khoury Project to interpret the visual form of Sinopia as a waveform and to create an electroacoustic composition that sampled audio recorded in Bahrain.

== Exhibitions ==
=== Solo exhibitions ===
Sabella exhibited his work at various venues in Palestine, including eleven solo exhibitions between 1998 and 2007. Selected solo exhibitions outside Palestine include: Steve Sabella: In Exile (Metroquadro Gallery, Rivoli, 2010); Euphoria & Beyond (The Empty Quarter Gallery, Dubai, 2010); Archaeology of the Future (International Center for Photography Scavi Scaligeri, Verona, 2014); Fragments (Berloni Gallery, London, 2014); Layers (Contemporary Art Platform, Kuwait, 2014); Independence (Meem Gallery, Dubai, 2014); Fragments From Our Beautiful Future (The Bumiller Collection, Berlin, 2017); TranscenDance (Der Divan, Berlin, 2024), The Liberated Image (Einstein Forum, Berlin, 2026).

=== Group exhibitions ===
Sabella has shown work in group exhibitions including Gates of the Mediterranean (Castello di Rivoli, Rivoli, 2008, curated by Martina Corgnati); Told/Untold/Retold (Mathaf: Arab Museum of Modern Art, Doha, 2010–11, curated by Sam Bardaouil & Till Fellrath; commissioned artist for the museum’s inaugural exhibition); Keep Your Eye on the Wall (Les Rencontres d’Arles, Arles, 2013, curated by MASASAM); View From Inside (FotoFest Biennial, Houston, 2014, curated by Karin Adrian von Roque); First Biennial of Photographers of the Contemporary Arab World (Institut du Monde Arabe and the Maison européenne de la photographie, Paris, 2015, curated by Gabriel Bauret); Nel Mezzo del Mezzo (RISO Museo, Palermo, 2015, curated by Christine Macel, Marco Bazzini, Bartomeu Mari); Contemporary Art of the Middle East and North Africa (The British Museum, London, 2019, curated by Venetia Porter); and Blocks (Museo Riso – Museo d’Arte Contemporanea della Sicilia, Palermo, 2021, curated by Daniela Brignone); and in Global Visions FotoFest Biennial, 2026, Houston.

In 2026, Sabella's Elsewhere (2020) was included in The Lost Paintings: A Prelude to Return at The MAC, Belfast, a group exhibition bringing together 53 artists from Palestine and its diaspora.

== Public collections and institutional commissions ==
Sabella’s work is held in a number of public and private institutional collections and has been presented through institutional commissions. In the United Kingdom, his work is included in the collection of the British Museum (London). In France, works by Sabella are held by the Institut du Monde Arabe (Paris), including through the Lemand donation initiative. In Qatar, he was among the artists commissioned for Told/Untold/Retold—part of Mathaf: Arab Museum of Modern Art’s inaugural programming, curated by Sam Bardaouil and Till Fellrath—and his work is also held in the Mathaf collection. In Bahrain, he participated as one of the commissioned artists in Recreational Purpose at the Bahrain National Museum, which also holds his work. In the United Arab Emirates, his work is held by the Barjeel Art Foundation (Sharjah) and has been exhibited at the Salsali Private Museum (Dubai). In Lebanon, his work is held by the Dalloul Art Foundation (Beirut). Contemporary Art Platform (Kuwait) presented a solo presentation titled Evolution at Art Paris at the Grand Palais (Paris) in 2018 and also holds his work. In addition, Sabella contributed to the Ars Aevi Museum initiative through Neighbours in Dialogue: Istanbul Collection for Ars Aevi Sarajevo, associated with curator Beral Madra.

== Selected art publications ==
=== Steve Sabella - Photography 1997-2014 ===
Steve Sabella – Photography 1997–2014 is Sabella's first monograph, published by Hatje Cantz in collaboration with the Akademie der Künste, Berlin (2014). The volume includes core texts by Hubertus von Amelunxen and a foreword by Kamal Boullata. Hatje Cantz describes the book as “read[ing] time and history out of the photographs,” framing the development of Sabella’s photographic oeuvre through exile, identity, migration, and the “divided topologies” of the 21st century.

=== Archaeology of the Future ===
Archaeology of the Future is the catalogue published by Maretti Editore to accompany Sabella’s 2014 exhibition of the same name at the Centro Internazionale di Fotografia Scavi Scaligeri (Verona), curated by Karin Adrian von Roques and edited by Beatrice Benedetti. The publication frames Sabella’s practice around the relationship between image and imagination, and discusses recurring themes in the exhibition such as fragmentation, transience, and estrangement. In his contribution, Sabella describes the project as “an expedition through image and imagination,” proposing an “archaeology of the future” grounded in memory, perception, and layered visual palimpsests.

=== Fragments From Our Beautiful Future ===
Fragments From Our Beautiful Future is a catalogue published by Kerber Verlag in 2017 accompanying the exhibition of the same name by Steve Sabella and Rebecca Raue at The Bumiller Collection, Berlin. The publication includes essays by Hubertus von Amelunxen, Ella Shohat, T.J. Demos, Elliot R. Wolfson, and A. S. Bruckstein Çoruh, among others.

In her contribution, Shohat reads Sabella’s 38 Days of Re-Collection through an “aesthetics of dis/placement,” describing the works’ scraped wall fragments and photographic overlays as a palimpsest of memory, domestic space, and historical rupture. In a separate essay, Demos interprets the series as “archaeological traces” that materialize geopolitical dislocation, framing the work around a dialectic of loss and attempted repair. Bruckstein Çoruh situates Sabella’s “archaeological” fragments within the exhibition’s broader dialogue between contemporary works and medieval objects, emphasizing a layered experience in which time becomes fluid and spatial. Amelunxen characterizes Sabella’s images as ghostly—“the absence of presence and the presence of absence”—suspended between place and time.

=== Palestine UNSETTLED ===
In 2022, Sabella published Palestine UNSETTLED, a photographic book supported by an AFAC grant and issued by Emaginity with support from the Dalloul Art Foundation. The publication presents 130 photographs made in Palestine during the Second Intifada and is designed without captions, dates, or any accompanying text except for an Arabic dedication reading “To Mohammad Al-Asaad and Children of the Dew,” referring to Al-Asaad’s iconic novel.

=== De/Colonising Palestine: Contemporary Debates ===
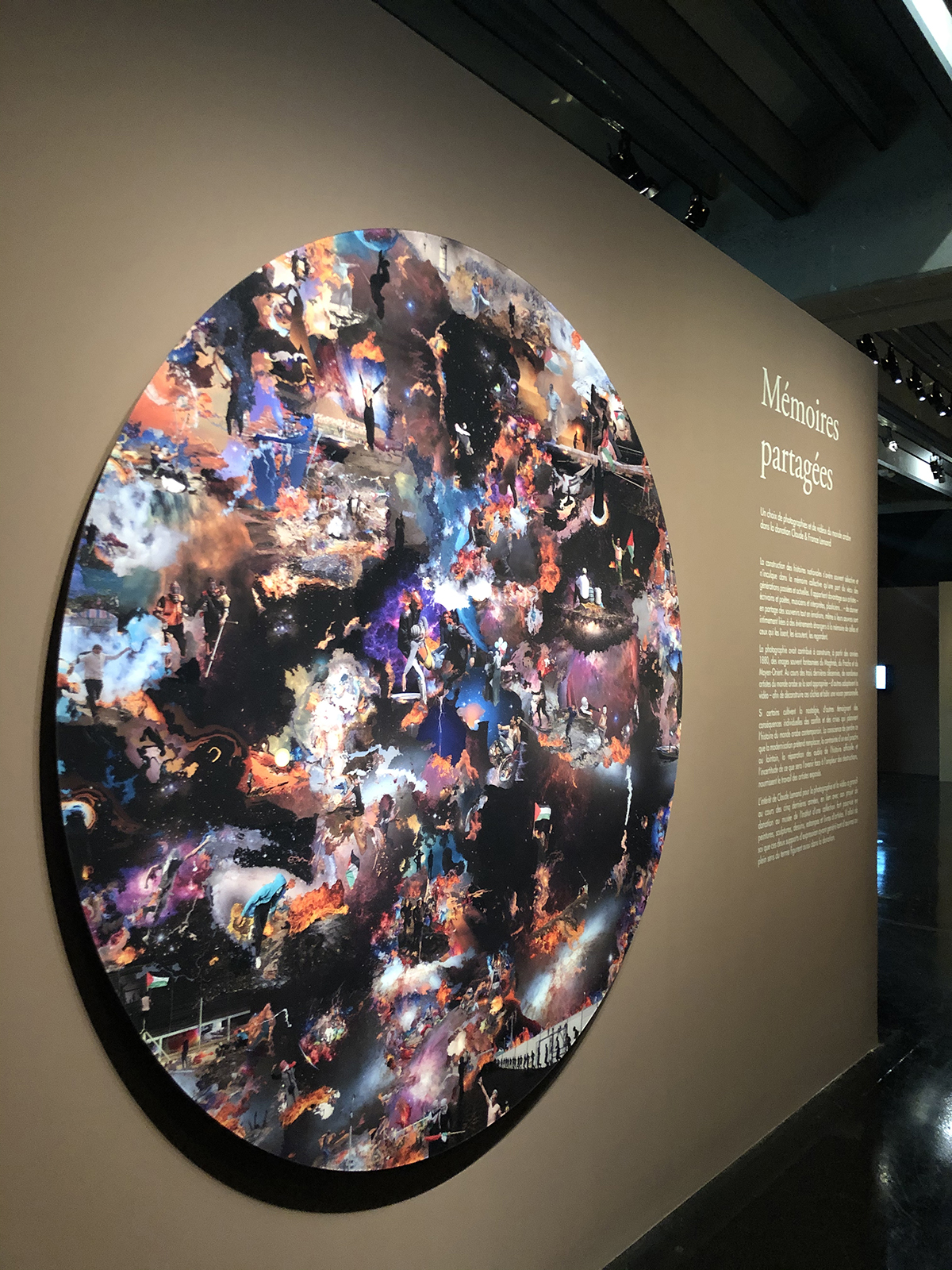
Installation shot of the Great March of Return (2019) by Steve Sabella at the Institut du Monde Arabe in Paris as part of the exhibition Mémoires Partagées.

Bocco, Riccardo; Saïd, Ibrahim (eds.). De/Colonising Palestine: Contemporary Debates. Geneva Graduate Institute, 2025. The cover image and other images in the volume are credited to Steve Sabella, and the book reproduces works from several of his series, including Elsewhere, 38 Days of Re-Collection, No Man’s Land, The Great March of Return, Everland, Exit, and SETTLEMENT | Six Israelis & One Palestinian. The volume also includes ‘The Parachute Paradox | Decolonizing the Imagination’ (chapter zero from Sabella’s memoir), which the introduction describes as delving into themes of identity, resilience, and imagination as tools of liberation. Contributors include Francesca P. Albanese (with Lex Takkenberg) and Ilan Pappé, among others.

=== Further reading ===
Sabella’s work has been reproduced and discussed in survey publications and edited volumes on contemporary Arab and Palestinian art, including the following:

Palestinian Art: From 1850 to the Present (Saqi Books, 2009)

- Boullata, Kamal. Palestinian Art: From 1850 to the Present. London: Saqi Books, 2009, pp. 301–303.

New Vision (Thames & Hudson / 2009)

- Amirsadeghi, Hossein; Mikdadi, Salwa; Shabout, Nada M. (eds.). New Vision: Arab Contemporary Art in the 21st Century. London: Thames & Hudson, 2009. pp. 250 - 253.

Keep Your Eyes on the Wall (Textuel, 2013)

- Snaije, Olivia; Albert, Mitchell. Keep Your Eyes on the Wall: Palestinian Landscapes. Paris, 2013.

From Galilee to the Negev (Phaidon, 2014)

- Shore, Stephen. From Galilee to the Negev. London/New York: Phaidon Press, 2014. (Sabella essay: “Hostage”, pp. 104-106).

Independence. Meem Gallery. Solo Exhibition

- Meagan Kelly Horsman, Madeline Yale Preston. Independence. Meem Publishing.

View From Inside: Contemporary Arab Photography, Video and Mixed Media Art (Schilt Publishing / FotoFest, 2014)

- von Roques, Karin Adrian (lead curator). View From Inside: Contemporary Arab Photography, Video and Mixed Media Art. Amsterdam: Schilt Publishing / FotoFest, 2014.

Steve Sabella Photography 1997 - 2014

- Hubertus Von Amelunxen, Kamal Boullata. Hatje Cantz, Akademie der Künste.

Steve Sabella. Archaeology of the Future

- Retrospective exhibition, Centro Internazionale di Fotografia Scavi Scaligeri, Verona. Flavio Tosi, Antonia Pavesi, Karin Adrian von Roques, Leda Mansour, Beatrice Benedetti. Maretti Editore, 2014.

Nel Mezzo Del Mezzo

- Macel Christine, Bazzini Marco, Mari Bartomeu. Nel Mezzo Del Mezzo: Contemporary Art in the Mediterranean. Palermo, Museo Riso. pp 200 - 202.

On the Arab-Jew, Palestine, and Other Displacements: Selected Writings (Pluto Press, 2017)

- Shohat, Ella. On the Arab-Jew, Palestine, and Other Displacements: Selected Writings. London: Pluto Press, 2017, cover art by Steve Sabella and essay in the introduction.

Fragments From Our Beautiful Future (Kerber Verlag, 2018)

Hubertus von Amelunxen, Ella Shohat, T.J Demos, Elliot Wolfson, Shulamit Bruckstein. Exhibition catalogue. The Bumiller Collection, Berlin. Essays on 38 Days of Re-Collection.

There Where You Are Not (Hirmer / 2019)

- Flood, Finbarr Barry (ed.). There Where You Are Not: Selected Writings of Kamal Boullata. Munich: Hirmer, 2019. pp. 138-144.

Reflections: Contemporary Art of the Middle East and North Africa (British Museum Press, 2020)

- Porter, Venetia. Reflections: Contemporary Art of the Middle East and North Africa. London: British Museum Press, 2020, p. 164

Becoming Palestine: Toward an Archival Imagination of the Future (Duke University Press, 2021)

- Hochberg, Gil Z. Becoming Palestine: Toward an Archival Imagination of the Future. Durham, NC: Duke University Press, 2021, Cover art by Steve Sabella.

Always Unconventional (Delius Klasing Verlag, 2023)

Always Unconventional. Leinfelden-Echterdingen: smart Europe GmbH, 2023. (Includes essay by Steve Sabella, “Art as a Powerful Tool for Liberation”).

Transcendance (Der Divan, Berlin)

Karin Adrian von Roques. TranscenDance. Steve Sabella Solo exhibition. Catalogue in German and Arabic.

Sumūd: A New Palestinian Reader (Seven Stories Press, 2024)

- Halasa, Malu; Elgrably, Jordan (eds.). Sumūd: A New Palestinian Reader. New York: Seven Stories Press, 2024, Cover art by Steve Sabella; pp. 149 -150).

Narrative Threads (Saqi / 2025)

- Barakat, Joanna. Narrative Threads: Palestinian Embroidery in Contemporary Art. London: Saqi Books, 2025. pp. 152-161.

De/Colonising Palestine (Geneva Graduate Institute, 2025)

- Riccardo Bocco, Ibrahim Said. Cover art by Steve Sabella. Introduction text pp. 10-13. pp 403-412.

== Writing ==
Alongside his visual practice, Sabella has developed a writing practice spanning essays and books. His texts move between reflections on the mechanics of the art world and questions of exile, liberation and how images carry history. He published essays on the international art market and art-world dynamics in Contemporary Practices Art Journal, where he was a regular contributor from 2008 to 2012.

=== The Parachute Paradox ===
Sabella’s memoir The Parachute Paradox: Decolonizing the Imagination was first published by Kerber Verlag in 2016. It recounts his upbringing in Jerusalem’s Old City under Israeli occupation and follows his later movement between places and cultures, framing exile as both a political condition and an inner one. Using the metaphor of a tandem jump with an Israeli, the book reflects on enforced entanglement—between lives, histories, and futures—and traces a search for liberation through questions of identity, displacement, and what Sabella calls the “colonization of the imagination.”

In a review in Al-Araby Al-Jadeed, poet and critic Mohammed Al-Assad (محمد الأسعد) wrote that the book presents an unprecedented subject in Palestinian literature: تحرير الذات والوطن من خلال تحرير المخيّلة (“the liberation of the self and the homeland through the liberation of the imagination”).

=== The Artist's Curse ===
On 21 September 2017, Sabella began publishing The Artist’s Curse as a daily online series of short texts (“curses”). The project was later expanded into the book The Artist’s Curse | On Being an Artist: Navigating the Art Market and the Art World (Emaginity Books, 2023), structured as 365 numbered reflections spanning themes from artistic purpose and the creative process to the practical realities of sustaining an art career. The double title is also read as The Artist’s Cure. The publication was sponsored by the Dalloul Art Foundation.

In 2024, The Artist’s Curse received a Silver Nautilus Book Award in the Creativity & Innovation category.

=== Always Unconventional ===
In 2023, Sabella contributed a commissioned essay on art as a powerful tool for liberation to Smart Europe’s 25th-anniversary book Always Unconventional, which features contributors and personalities including Robbie Williams and Ólafur Arnalds.

== Recognition ==
=== Sabella has received awards and scholarships including ===
- (2002) Young Artist of the Year Award, A. M. Qattan Foundation (Palestine).
- (2007) Chevening Scholarship (MA, Photographic Studies, University of Westminster).
- (2008) Caparo Award of Distinction (MA, Photographic Studies, University of Westminster).
- (2008) Independent Photographers Terry O’Neill Award (shortlisted and exhibited).
- (2008) Ellen-Auerbach-Fellowship for Photography, Akademie der Künste (Berlin).
- (2009) Saïd Foundation Scholarship (MA, Art Business, Sotheby’s Institute of Art).
- (2016) Nautilus Book Award (Gold, for The Parachute Paradox).
- (2017) Eric Hoffer Award (for The Parachute Paradox).
- (2017) Finalist, International Book Awards (for The Parachute Paradox).
- (2017) Visual Arts grant, Arab Fund for Arts and Culture (AFAC).
- (2024) Silver Nautilus Book Award in the Creativity & Innovation category for The Artist's Curse book.

=== Documentaries and video interviews ===
Sabella has been the subject of documentaries, including In The Darkroom with Steve Sabella by Nadia Johanne Kabalan (2014). He has also appeared in interviews for Deutsche Welle, France 24, Al Jazeera and The Electronic Intifada.

== Image gallery ==
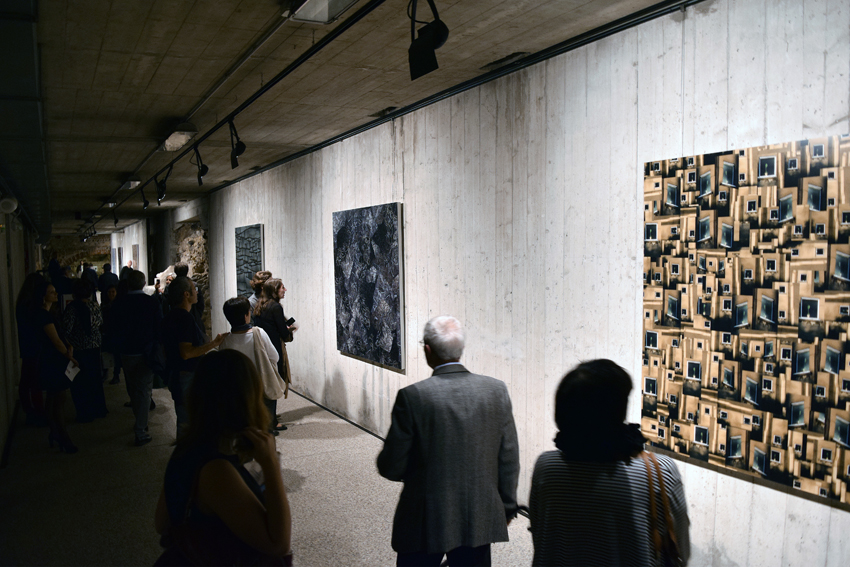
2

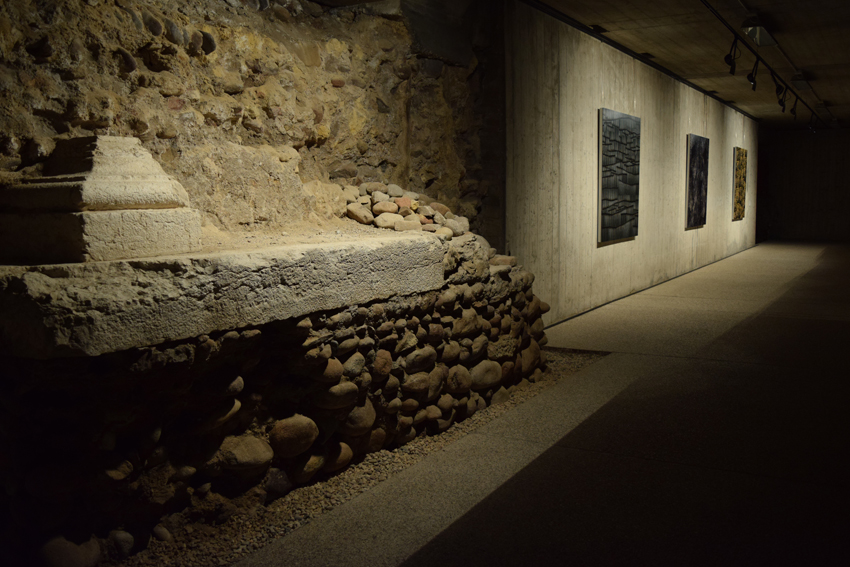
3

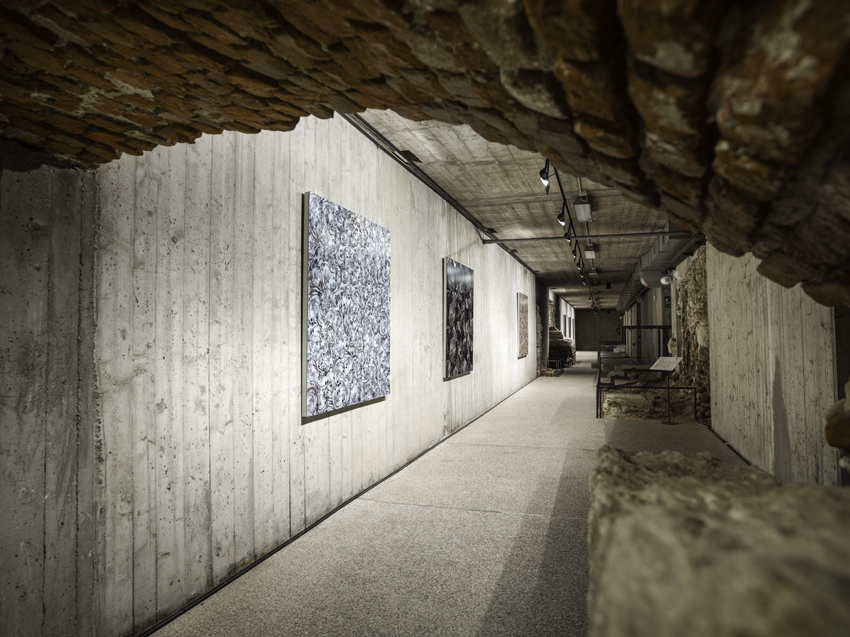
4

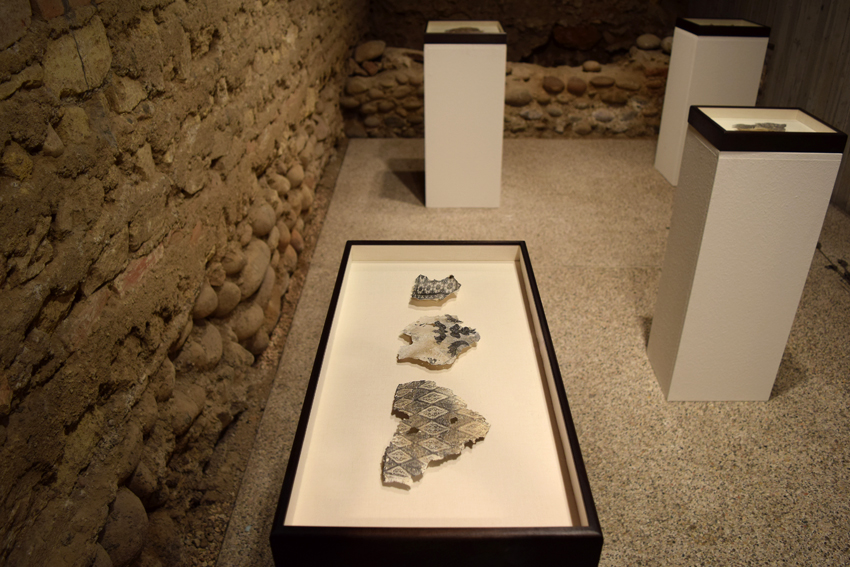
5

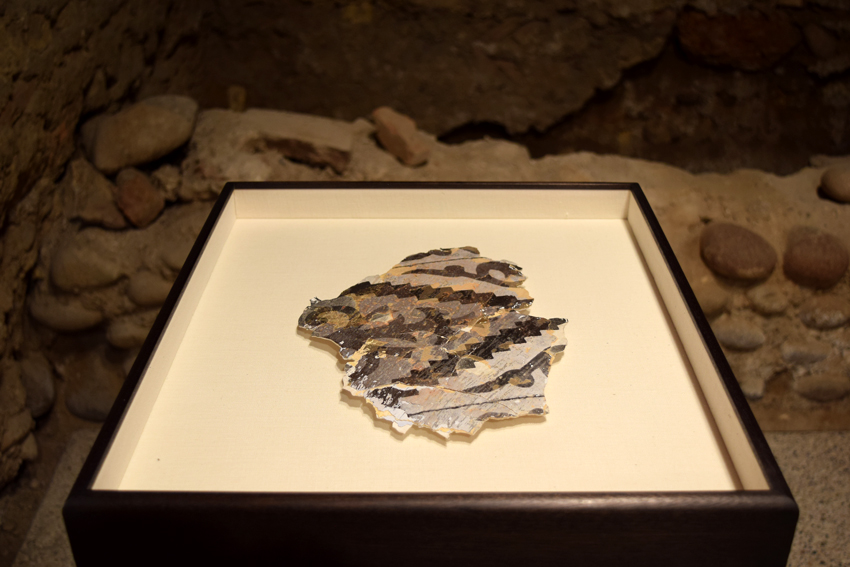
6

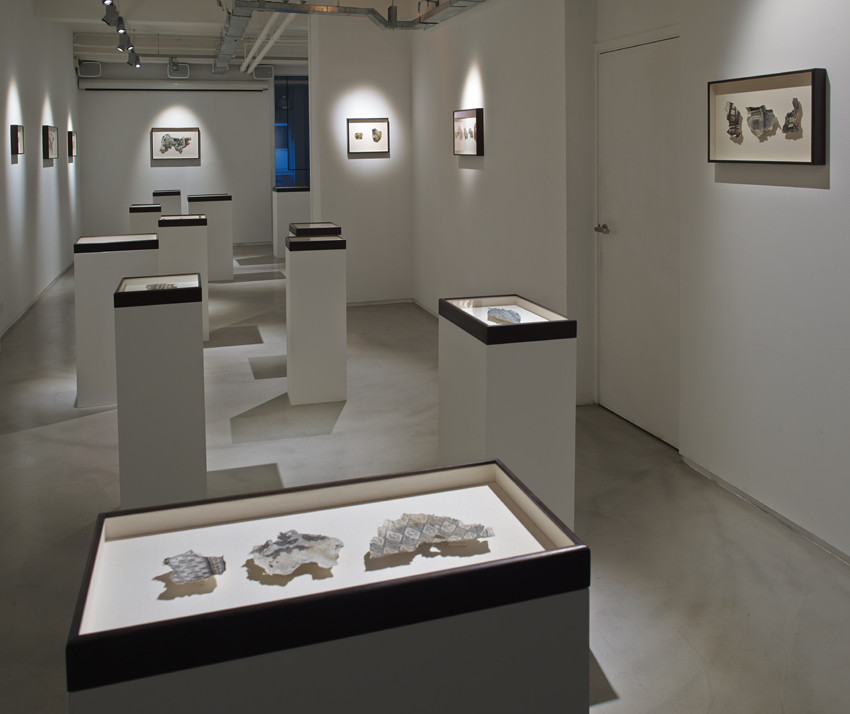
7

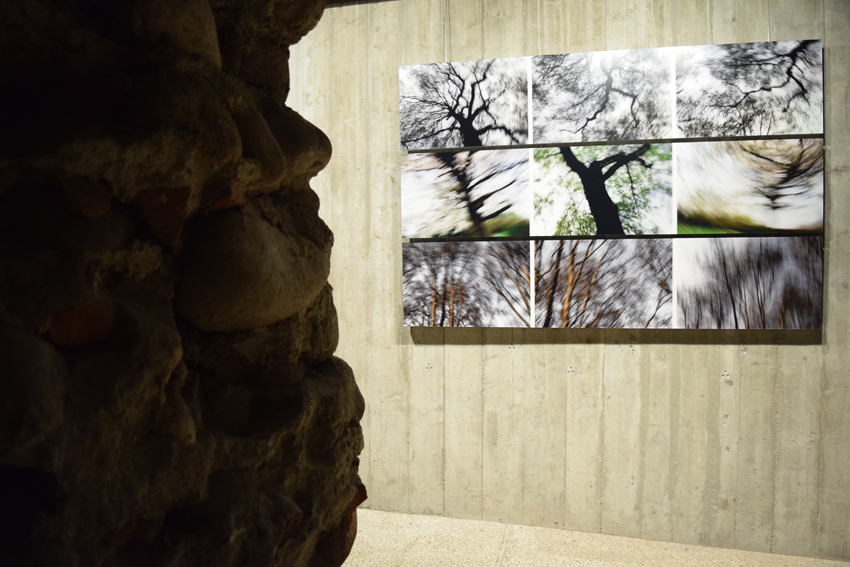
8

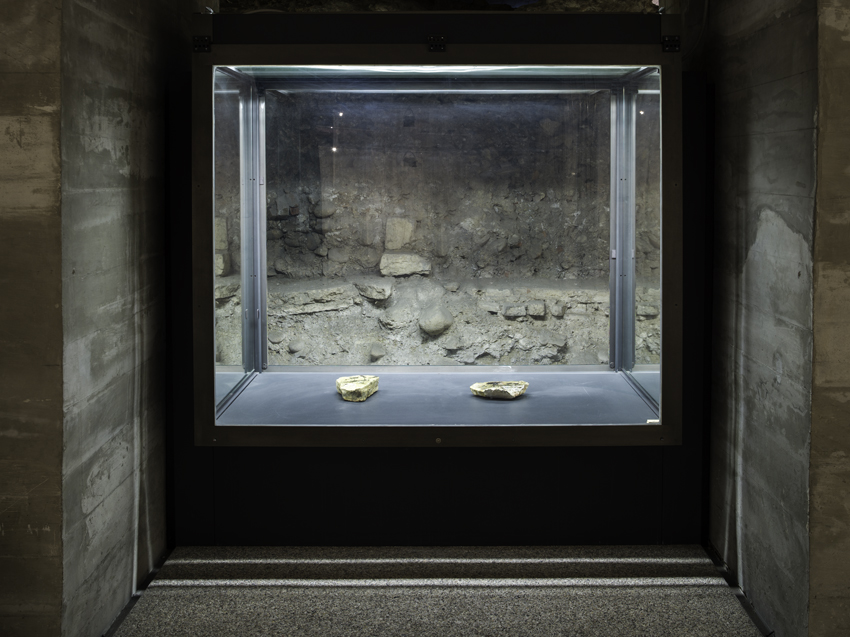
9

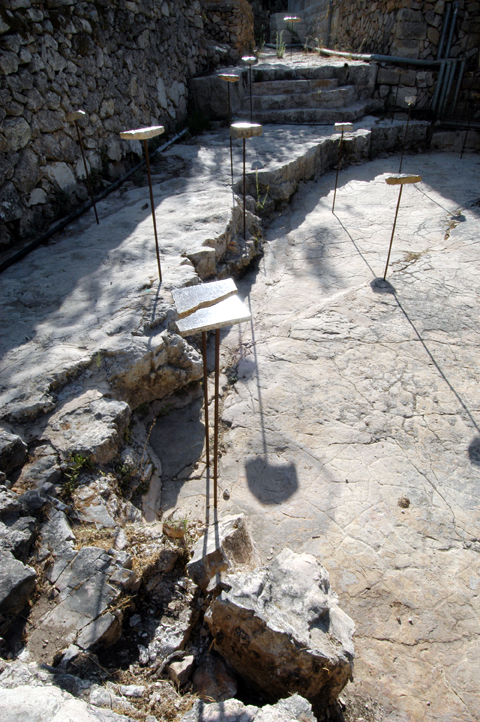
10

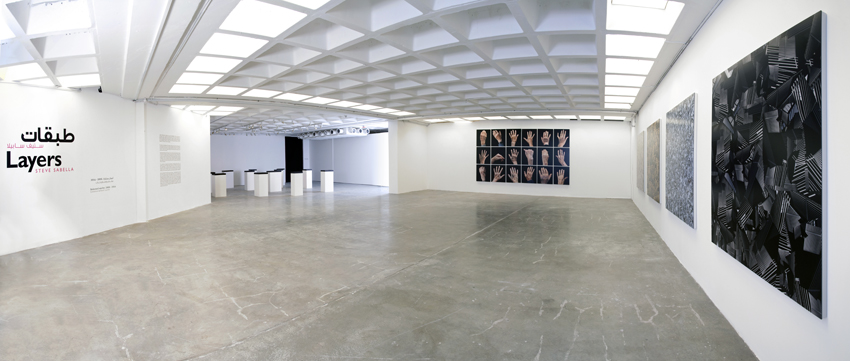
11

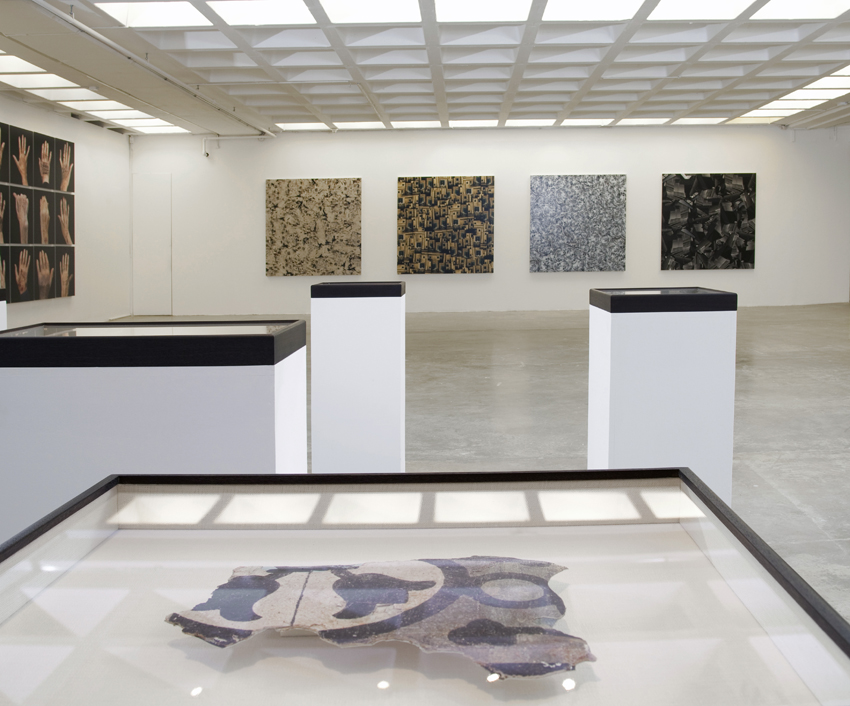
12

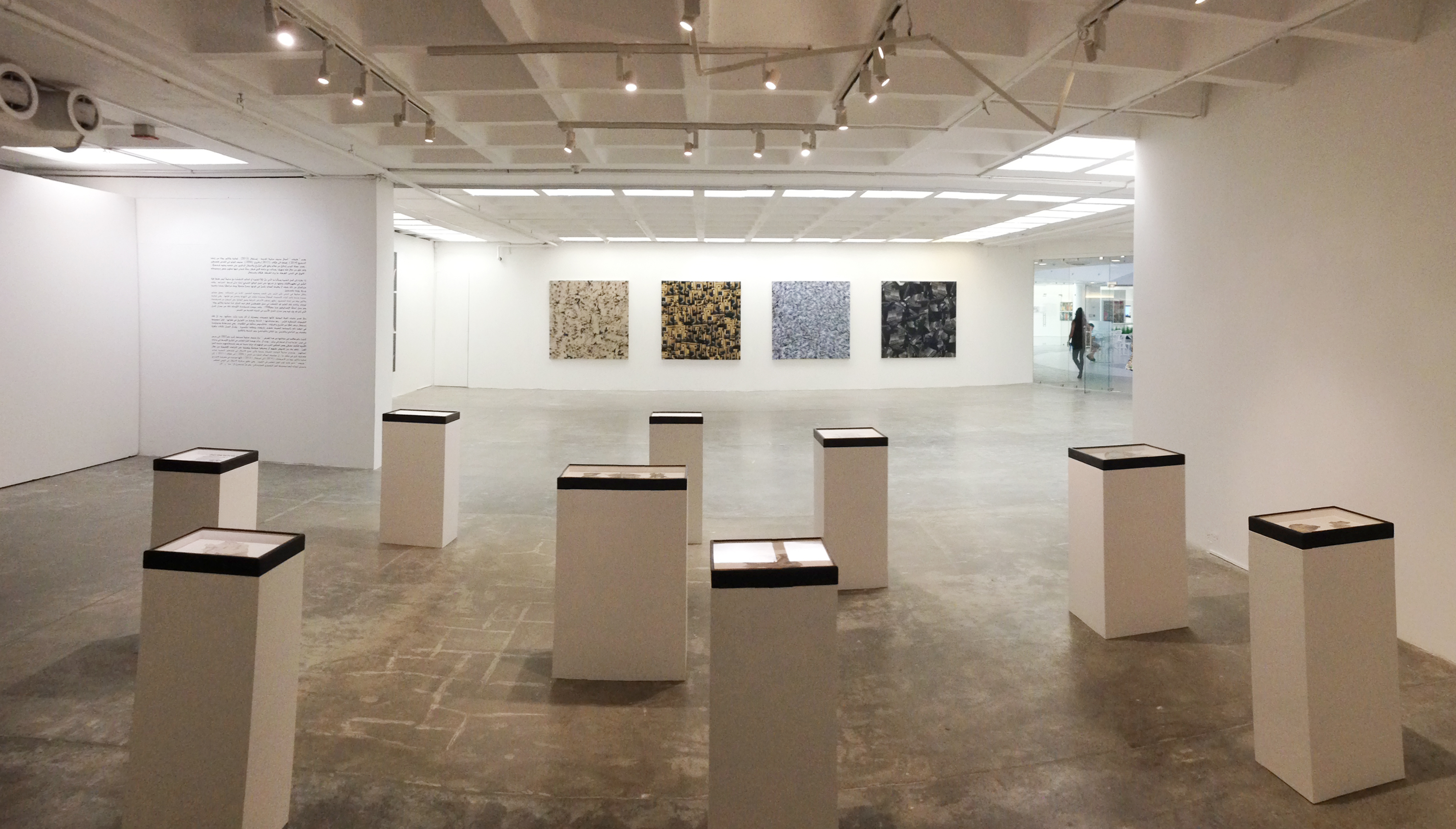
13

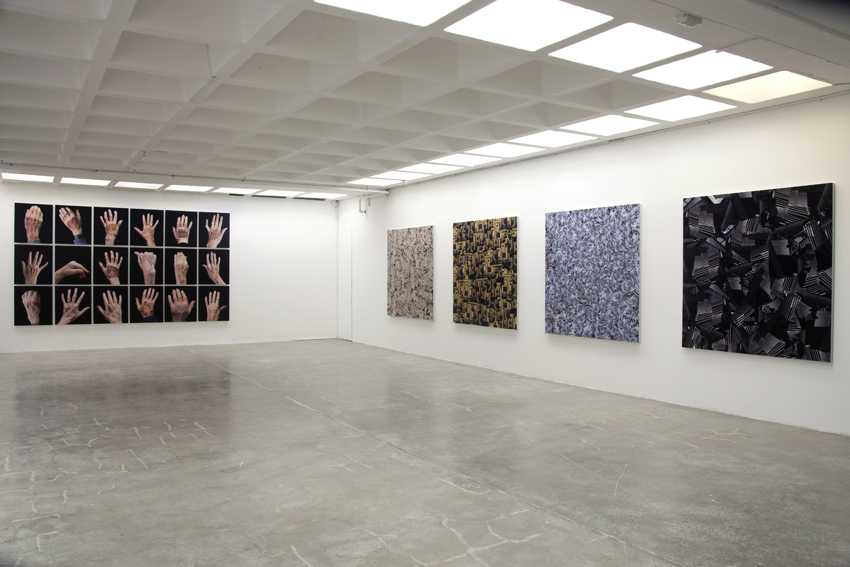
14

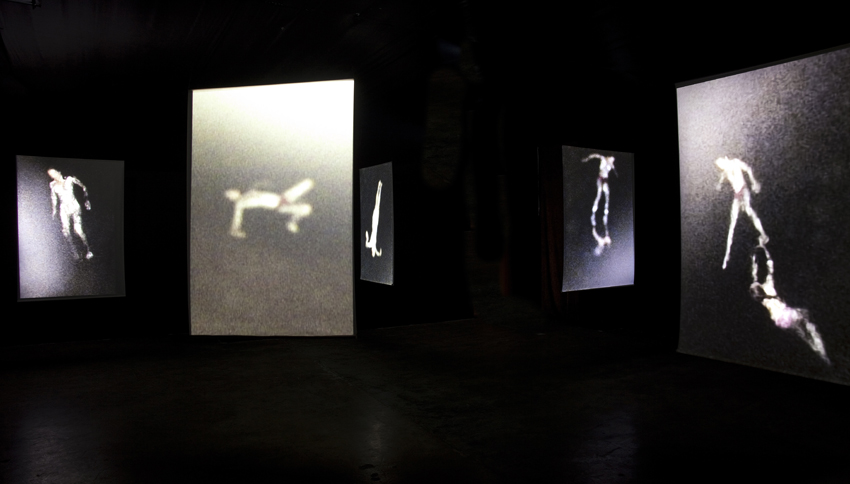
15

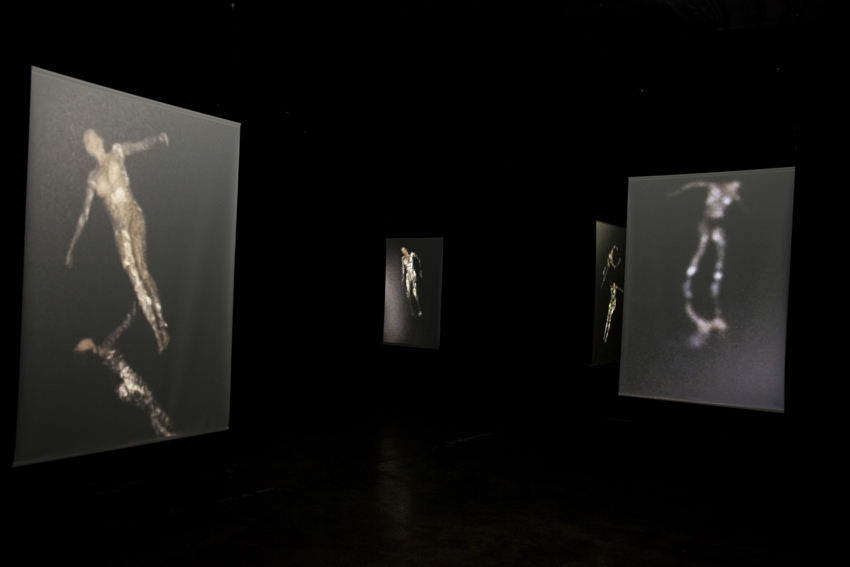
16

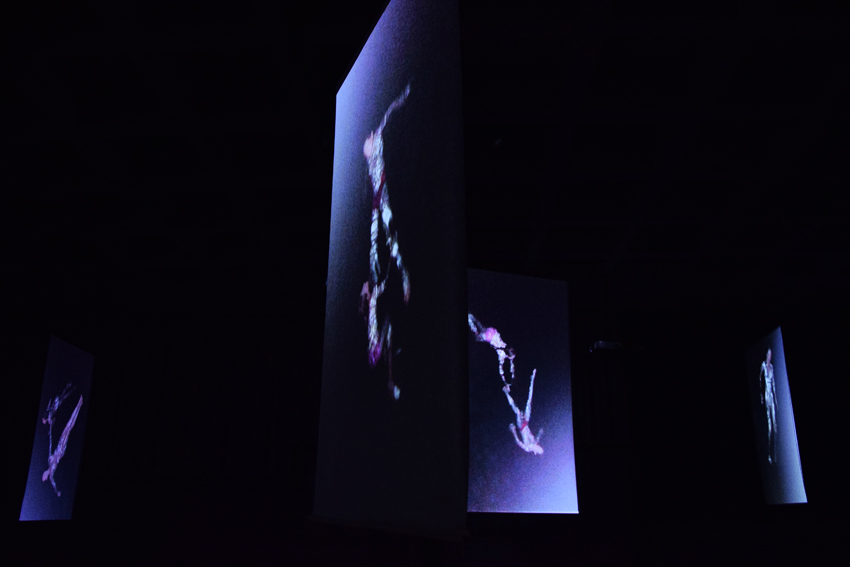
17

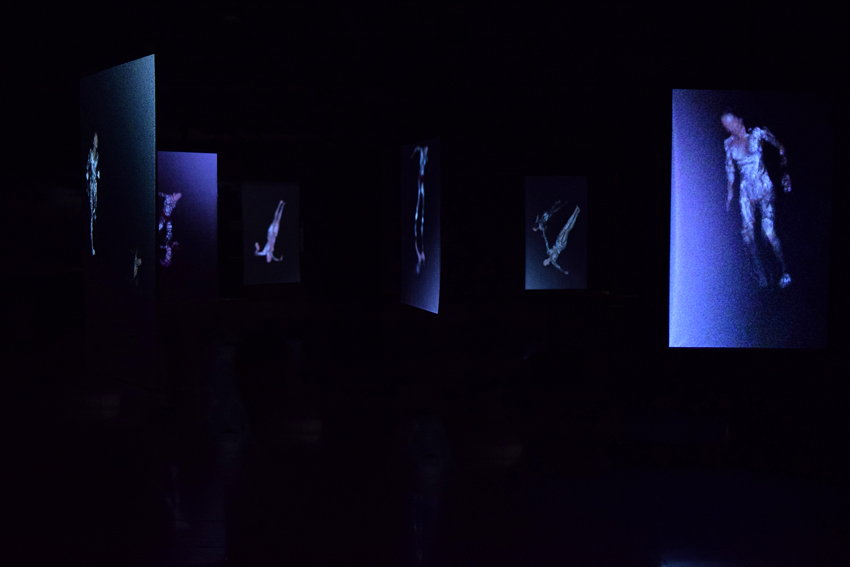
18

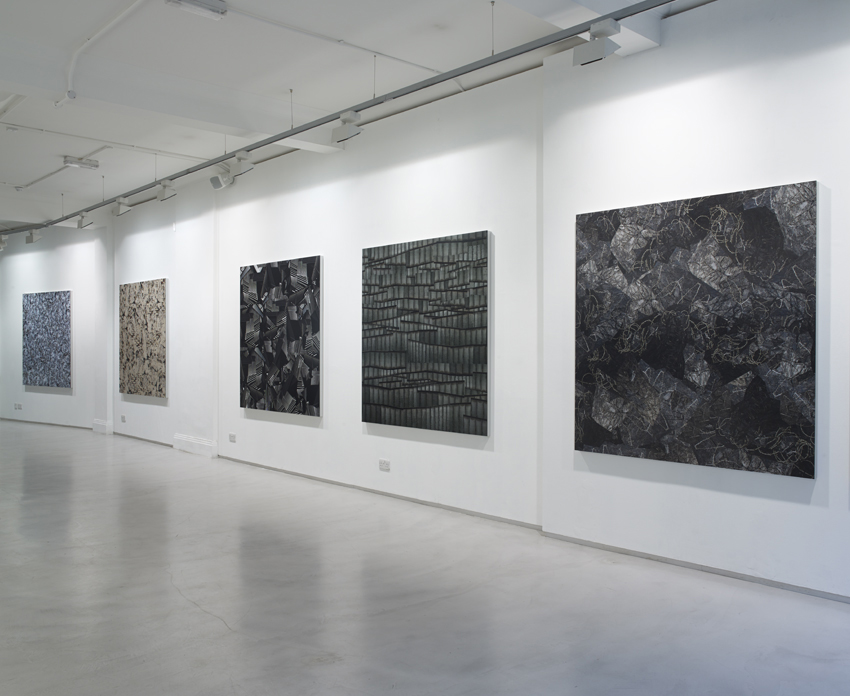
19

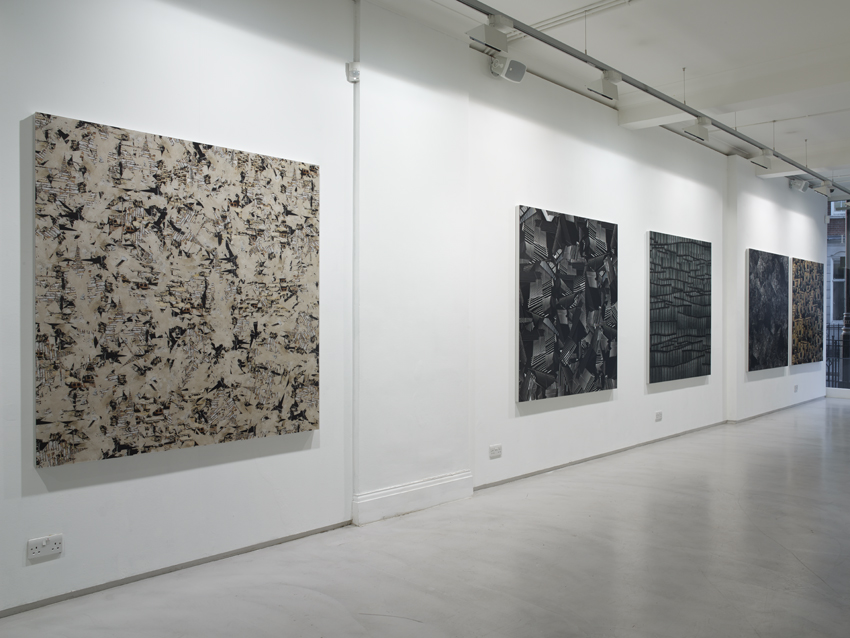
20

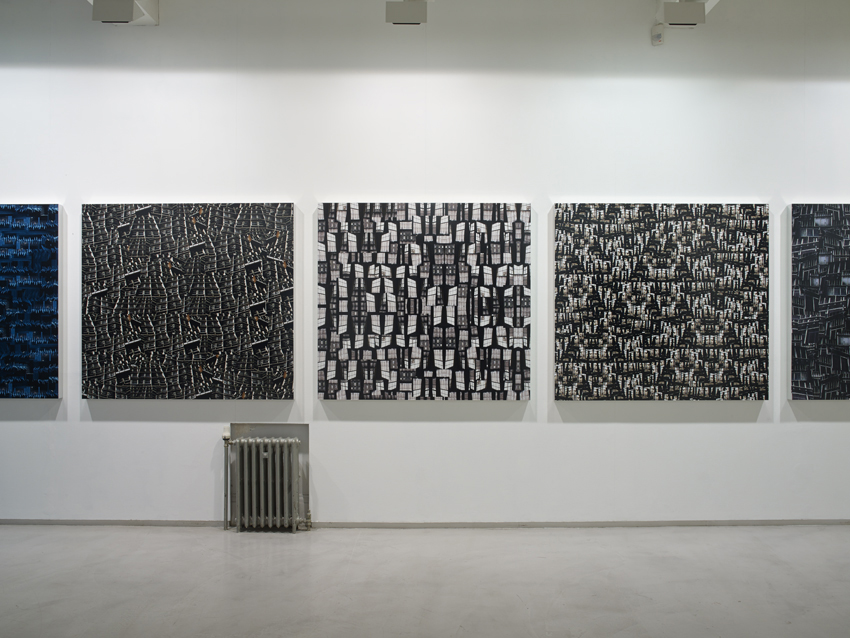
21

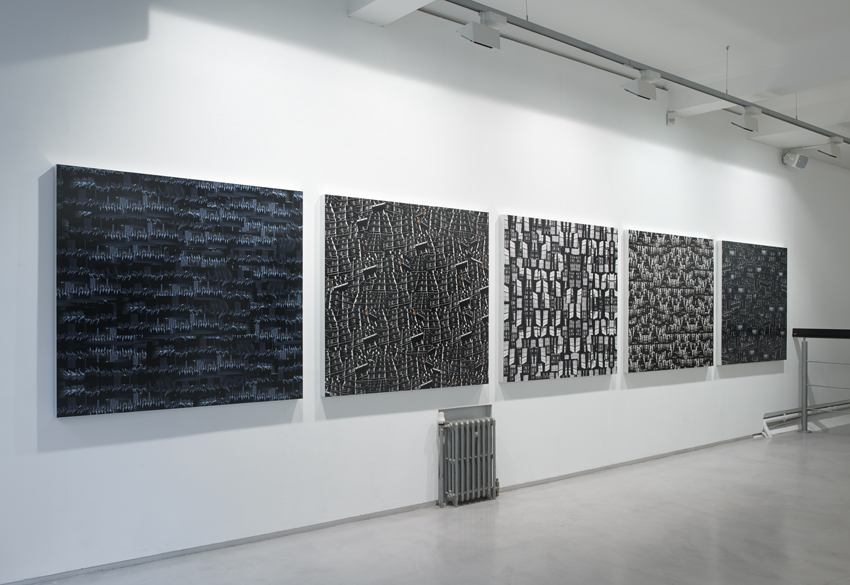
22

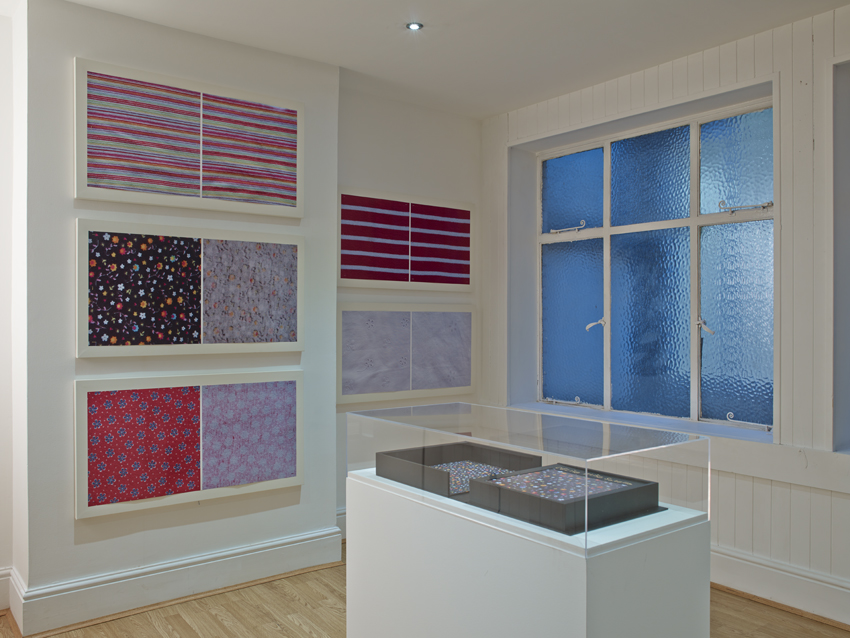
23

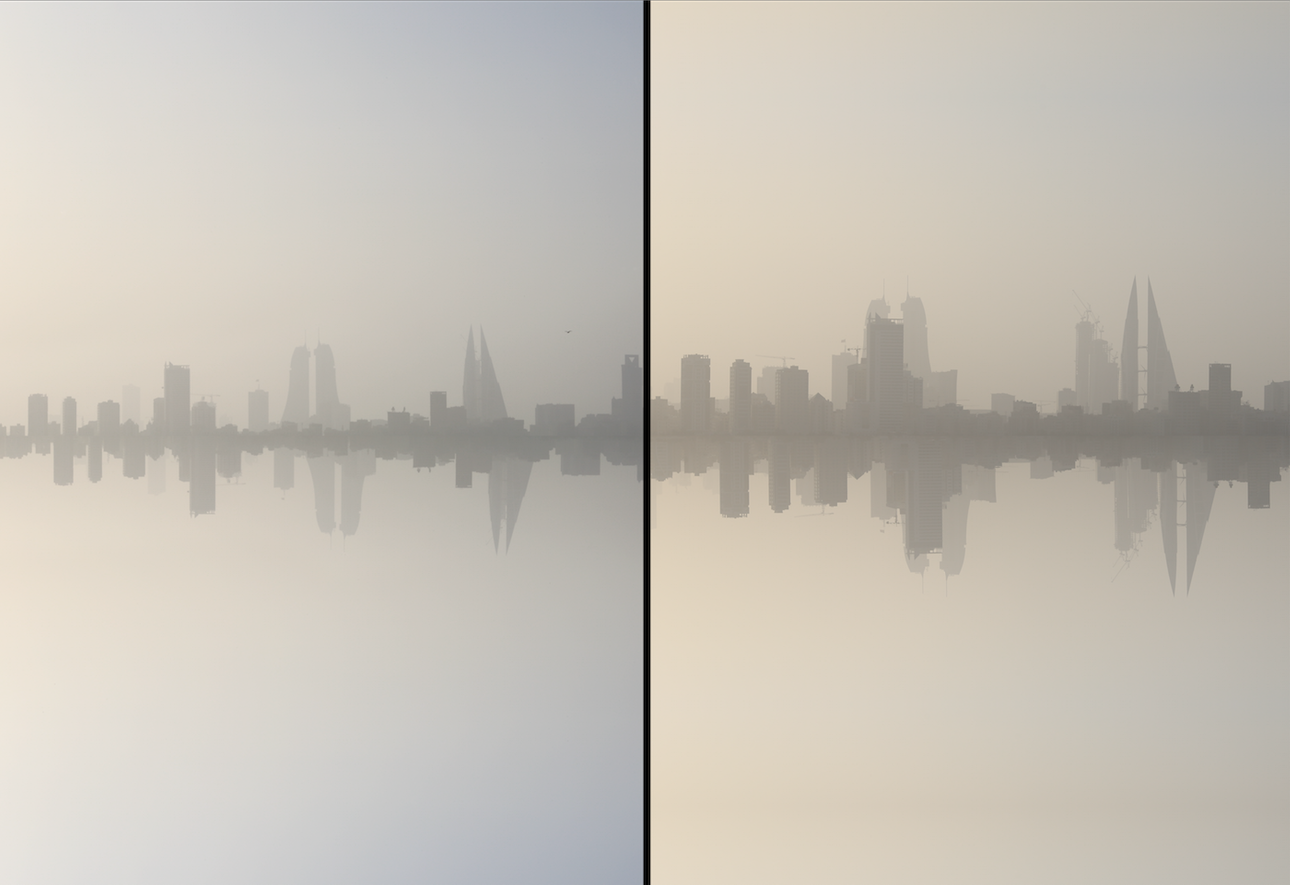
24

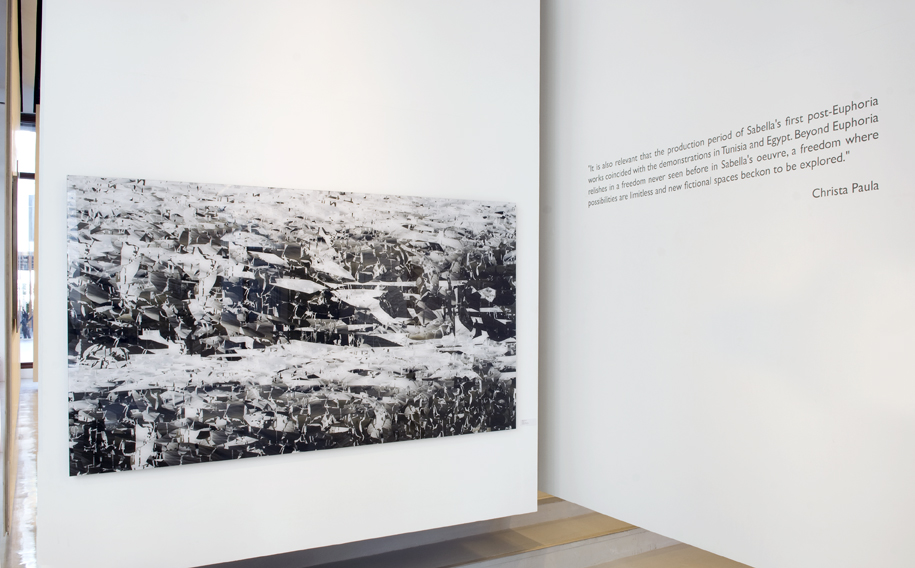
25

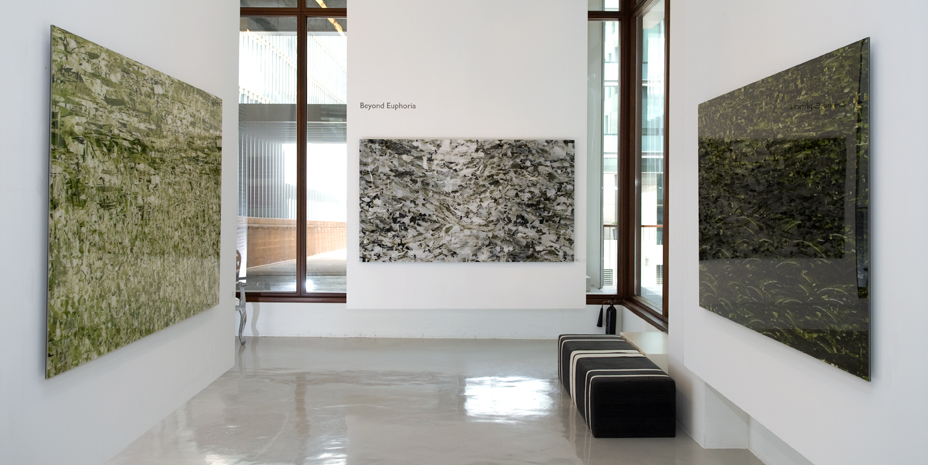
26

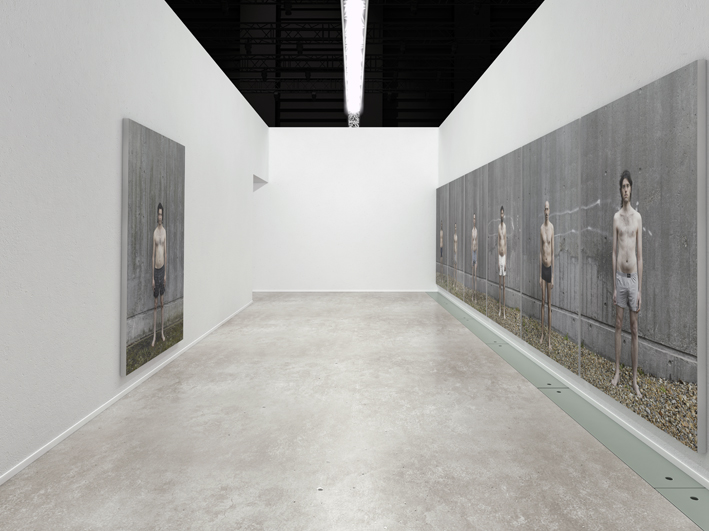
27

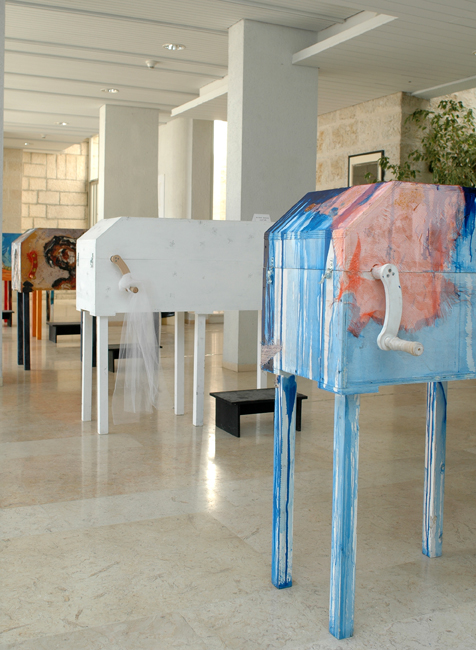
28

== See also ==
- Akademie der Künste
- Kamal Boullata
- British Museum
- List of University of Westminster alumni
- Mathaf: Arab Museum of Modern Art
- Palestinian art
- TED (conference)
