= Matt Richards (filmmaker) =

Matt Richards (born 21 November 1967) is a film and television producer/director/writer from St Minver in Cornwall.

== Biography ==
After attending the University of Westminster Film School he raised the budget to follow explorer Michael Turner on an expedition to Senegal and the Cape Verde Islands and make a short film about his efforts to document the landing places of Sir Francis Drake. This film was so well received that the BBC commissioned him to complete the film which included a voyage to Panama to attempt to locate and raise the coffin of Sir Francis Drake. This expedition failed but the subsequent film In Drake's Wake was shown on BBC2. His next film was The Gold Plane, again for BBC2. Narrated by John Nettles, this 50-minute film followed the quest to prove that a plane crash in 1944 was the work of sabotage to prevent the secrets of D-Day being revealed to General Charles de Gaulle in Algiers. Since then he has made several historical documentaries which include Spilt Blood, In Search of the King, The Falklands War – The Real Thing, People's War, Industrial Revelations – Best of British and Secrets Beneath Our Feet.

In addition to these programmes and series he has directed long-running observational documentary series such as A National Treasure, The Tale of Three Farms, Civvy To Sailor, Fighter Pilot and Parklife. Other series include Out & About, How Do They Do It?, Collector's Lot, My Greek Kitchen, Treasures, Front of House, Seventy Years Under The Stars, Team Spirit, Health Matters, Cornish Chronicles, and Big Day Out. Recent programmes have included Wife Swap for Channel Four and Extraordinary People for Five. He has made a documentary mini-series about the International Brigade and their role in the Spanish Civil War, "The Brits Who Fought For Spain", which was a major collaboration between British and Spanish producers and broadcasters. He also made Rory & Paddy's Great British Adventure featuring Rory McGrath and Paddy McGuinness for Five as well as "Robson Green's Extreme Fishing" and "The Secret D-Day Disaster" for Five.

He directed the award-winning short film "If I Wish Really Hard" in 2010 and his first feature film "To Say Goodbye" received its World Premiere at the 2012 San Sebastian International Film Festival where it was nominated for the 2012 Serbitzu Award and was Executive Producer of the film "Ten Billion" directed by Peter Webber.

In 2012 he was awarded the 'Spirit of Tiger' Award in New Jersey, USA for "…outstanding documentary coverage of WWII."

He is the co-author, along with Mark Langthorne, of the books "83 Minutes: The Doctor, The Damage & The Shocking Death of Michael Jackson" (Blink, 2015), "Somebody To Love: The Life, Death & Legacy of Freddie Mercury" (Blink, 2016) and "The Hidden Army" (John Blake Publishing, 2018).
