= Melanie Walsh =

English writer and illustrator

- Born: July 18, 1964 (age 61); Bushey, Hertfordshire, England
- Known for: Illustrations
- Website: melaniewalshbooks.com

Melanie Walsh (born Bushey, Hertfordshire, 18 July 1964) is an English writer and illustrator of children's books. She studied at Harrow School of Art and the Royal College of Art.

She has won the Parents Choice Gold Award for Do Pigs Have Stripes?

She lives in London with her twins.

== Selected works ==
- Isaac and His Amazing Autism Superpowers, ISBN 9781406373141, 2025, Walker Books
- When We Grow Up: A First Book Of Jobs, ISBN 9781406394481 Publication date: 01 Jul 2021 Walker Books
- Goodbye Grandma, ISBN 1406346756 Publication Date 2014 Walker Books
- 10 Things I Can Do to Help My World, ISBN 978-0-7636-4144-3, Publication date: 08/26/2008 Walker Books
- Big and Little, ISBN 978-0-7636-1512-3, Publication date: 08/28/2001 Walker Books
- Do Donkeys Dance?, ISBN 978-0-618-00330-3, Publication date: 03/28/2000
- Do Donkeys Dance?, ISBN 978-0-618-15046-5, Publication date: 03/29/2002
- Do Lions Live on Lily Pads?, ISBN 978-0-618-47300-7, Publication date: 06/12/2006 Egmont Books
- Do Lions Live on Lily Pads?, ISBN 978-1-4052-1884-9, Publication date: 01/31/2006 Egmont Books
- Do Monkeys Tweet?, ISBN 978-0-395-85081-7, Publication date: 09/29/1997Heinemann Books
- Do Monkeys Tweet?, ISBN 978-0-395-98795-7, Publication date: 10/25/1999 Heinemann Books
- Do Pigs Have Stripes?, ISBN 978-0-395-98796-4, Publication date: 10/25/1999 Heinemann Books
- Do Pigs Have Stripes?, ISBN 978-0-395-73976-1, Publication date: 04/28/1996 Heinemann Books
- Farm Animals, ISBN 978-0-7636-1806-3, Publication date: 04/01/2002 Campbell Books
- Hide and Sleep, ISBN 978-0-7894-4820-0, Publication date: 09/29/1999 DK publishing
- Minnie and Her Baby Brother, ISBN 978-0-7636-2060-8, Publication date: 07/15/2003 Walker Books
- My Beak, Your Beak, ISBN 978-0-618-15079-3, Publication date: 09/28/2002 Transworld Books
- My Nose, Your Nose, ISBN 978-0-552-54766-6, Publication date: 10/23/2003 Transworld Books
- My Nose, Your Nose, ISBN 978-0-618-15077-9, Publication date: 09/28/2002 Transworld Books
- Ned's Rainbow, ISBN 978-0-7894-5623-6, Publication date: 09/28/2000 DK publishing
- Sister Smiles, ISBN 0751371408, 1998, Dorling Kindersley
