= Sarah Mukherjee =

Former BBC Environment Correspondent

Sarah Mukherjee MBE (born 1967) is a former BBC Environment Correspondent. She was born in London and was educated at Loughton County High School in Essex, before attending St Hilda's College, Oxford, where she read law. After working at the House of Commons of the United Kingdom in PR and consultancy, Mukherjee completed her diploma in Journalism at the Polytechnic of Central London. Sarah joined BBC local radio in 1990 as a reporter and became an Environment Specialist 1992-2001 and an Environment Correspondent with the BBC 2001 - 2010.

Mukherjee's mother was a single parent, and she spent much of her childhood on a council estate in Essex. She wrote, in the BBC's internal magazine, Ariel, of her concerns about the portrayal by the media of the white, working-class people she grew up with.

Sarah regularly contributed on Radio 4's Today programme, often reporting live from rural areas countryside and rural issues.

In 2005 she was granted the first interview with the Prince of Wales for more than a decade, in which he spoke of his concerns about the environment.

In 2010, Sarah became the Director of Environment for Water UK, running until 2017.

In 2017, she took up the post of Chief Executive of the Crop Protection Association.

In 2020, Sarah became the CEO of the Institute of Environmental Management & Assessment (IEMA).

Sarah has been a panel member for the National Parks Review and sat on the National Food Strategy Advisory Panel and is currently a Non-Executive Director on the Board of the Environment Agency.

Sarah is a former director of the Oxford Farming Conference and was awarded an MBE for her services to agriculture and farmer well-being in 2021.
