= Henry's Final Dream =

- Origin: London, England
- Genres: Post-punk, new wave
- Years active: 1979–1982
- Labels: Eskimo Vinyl
- Members: Peter Millward; Martin Pavey; Tiffer Breakey; Gary Bryson

Henry’s Final Dream were an English 1980s London-based post-punk band, who played the college circuit and recorded two EP’s with the Eskimo Vinyl label. They took their name from the cult movie, Eraserhead (and an illustration in Carl Jung's Man and His Symbols).

Their sound was described by Paul Morley of New Musical Express as “go-getting sax stirred art-pop… Airy melodies, self-conscious lyrics, an early Undertones with pretension – could one day be sublime.” Sheffield fanzine NMX commented, “Sounds to me (like) The Distractions too stoned to play properly and put through a fuzz-box. I like it, very much.”

== History ==
The band members met in the late 1970s as students at the Polytechnic of Central London. Peter Millward wrote their original material, and was guitarist, vocalist and all-round front-man. Martin Pavey played bass guitar, Tiffer Breakey, drums, and Gary Bryson tenor sax, harmonica and occasional vocals.

HFD were formed in the crucible of a student musical appreciation society, set up originally to squeeze beer money out of the Student Union. However, the band quickly realised there was more money to be made taking their brand of anarchic indie rock to the masses. This proved to be a shrewd move, and the resulting 1 pound 75 pence was put towards a recording session which produced their first EP in the summer of 1980, Indian Summer. This was followed in early 1981 with their second offering, I Couldn’t Jump. Ilford indie mag Outlet described I Couldn’t Jump as “a haunting theme and a fizzing sax solo”, and The St Alban's Review and Advertiser said it was “fun… a cut above the all-out punk thrash of most such records.” A bootleg recording of the band’s appearance upstairs at London’s Ronnie Scott’s Club in 1981 is also known to be in existence, though something of a rarity.

Peter Millward now lives and works in Hong Kong where he runs Drum Music with partner and friend Eddie Chung, He also records his own music under the name Celestial, which he reluctantly describes as "asian dub". Martin Pavey runs his own music production and sound design company in the UK, Tiffer Breakey lives and works in England, and Gary Bryson is a journalist and author now living in Sydney. His novelTurtle was published by Allen & Unwin.

== Discography ==
=== EPs ===
- "Indian Summer", b/w "In The Marketplace", "Autumn" (1980) Eskimo Vinyl
- "I Couldn't Jump", b/w "If I knew (What Love Was)", "Locked Inside Your Wardrobe" (1981) Eskimo Vinyl

=== LPs ===
- "Upstairs at Ronnie's", (1981) Bootleg

=== Compilations ===
- "Eskimo Vinyl Anthology" (with Pocket Spiders and The Jangletties), (2005) Eskimo Vinyl
