= Matt Smith (TV reporter) =

British broadcaster

Matt Smith is a British broadcaster.

== Broadcasting career ==
Smith was an entertainment correspondent for the 24-hour news channel Sky News covering entertainment news for the channel, from 2003 until April 2011.

Previously, he worked at the BBC in London and was a reporter and presenter for BBC News, having worked on Radio 1 Newsbeat, BBC GLR, and Liquid News.

As a studio presenter, he presented programmes such as Sky News at 10, The Live Desk and was an occasional presenter of the media show, SkyNews.com on Sky News.

He is a graduate from the University of Westminster where he specialised in broadcast journalism.

He now runs a production company called Tech TV, making corporate films and broadcast documentaries and also works as a freelance presenter.
