= World Rugby (disambiguation) =

World Rugby is the world governing body for the sport of rugby union.

== Other uses ==
- World Rugby (video game), published by Zeppelin Games in 1993.

== See also ==
- Rugby League International Federation, the world governing body for the sport of rugby league.
- Rugby World, a monthly sports magazine covering rugby, first published in October 1960.
- World Rugby Museum, a collection of rugby memorabilia in London, formerly known as ‘The Museum of Rugby’.
