= The Home of Football =

Home of Football may refer to:

- The Home of Football Stadium, a proposed football stadium in Sheffield, England
- Wembley Stadium, a stadium in Wembley, London, built in place of the old Wembley Stadium
- Wembley Stadium (1923), a former football stadium in Wembley, London

== See also ==
- The Homes of Football, a photographic exhibition by Stuart Roy Clarke
