= National Football Museum =

Coordinates: 53°29′08″N 2°14′31″W

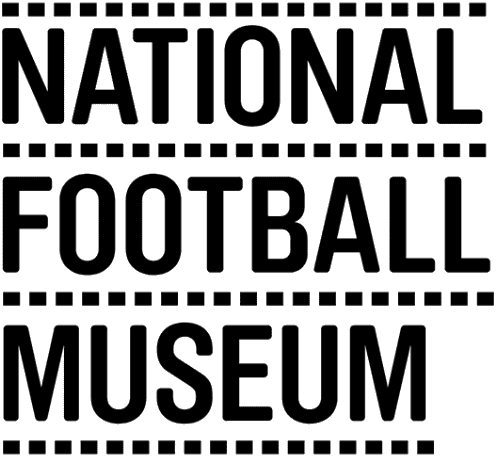

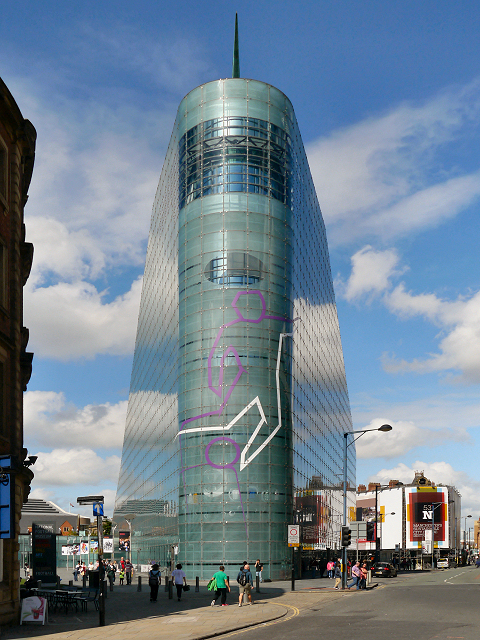
- Exterior of the museum in 2012
- Established: February 2001; 25 years ago
- Location: Urbis, Manchester (2012–); Deepdale, Preston (2001–2010)
- Type: Sports museum
- Visitors: 574,000 (2016)
- Public transit access: Manchester Victoria; Exchange Square; Metroshuttle (Routes 1 & 2)
- Website: nationalfootballmuseum.com

The National Football Museum is England's national museum of football. It is based in the Urbis building in Manchester city centre, and preserves, conserves and displays important collections of football memorabilia.

The museum was originally based in Deepdale, Preston, Lancashire, but moved to Manchester in 2012.

== History ==
=== Origins ===
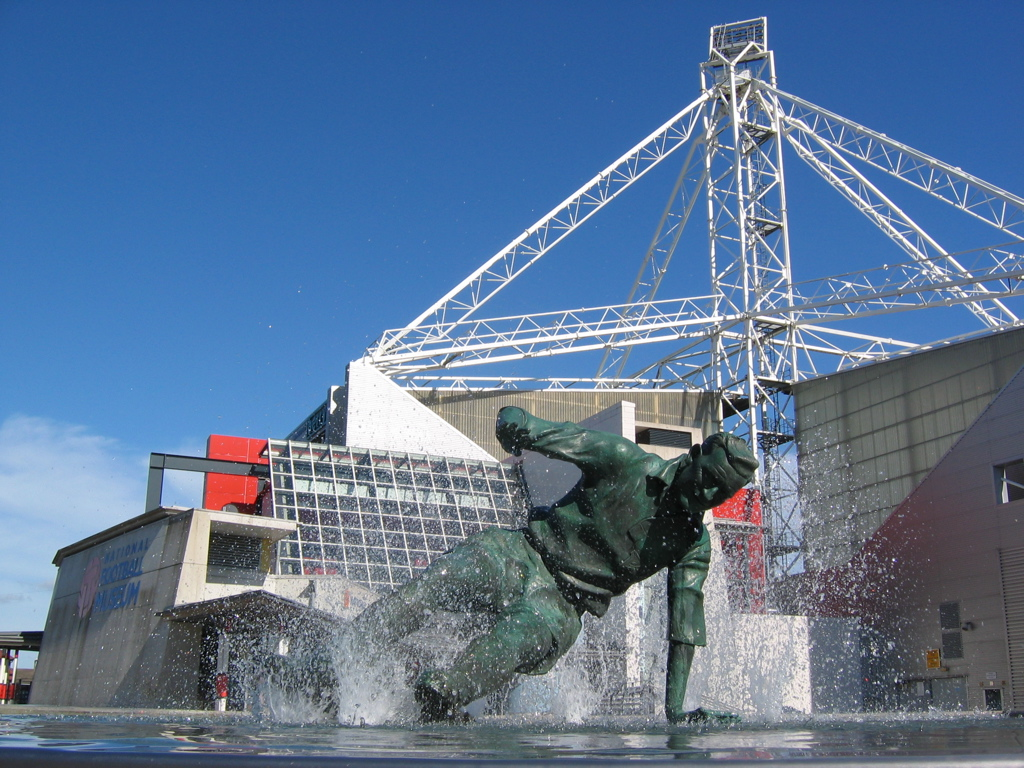
Statue recreating the famous Tom Finney "Splash" photo outside the old National Football Museum.

The idea for what became the National Football Museum goes back to 1994 when Baxi Partnership, a local company, acquired Preston North End Football Club (PNE) and began the redevelopment of Deepdale Stadium. A chance conversation between Bryan Gray, Chairman of PNE, and the Football League, led to a meeting with Harry Langton, the man who over thirty years put together what is now called the FIFA Museum Collection. FIFA recognised the importance of the collection and acquired it from Harry Langton with a view to finding a permanent home. FIFA saw the proposed museum at Preston as an ideal permanent location for the FIFA Museum Collection.

Bryan Gray formed a small team of people to work on the project including Keith Cooper of FIFA, David Fleming, Director of Tyne and Wear Museums, Brian Booth, formerly Vice Chancellor of the University of Central Lancashire, and Chris Newbery, director of the Royal Marines Museum in Portsmouth. The Football Association was represented by David Davies. The National Football Museum was incorporated as a private limited company in June 1995 and became a registered charity in November 1995.

=== Preston ===
After much hard work, an application to the Heritage Lottery Fund was successful and a grant of £7.5m was awarded in November 1997. The Museum would be located in the Bill Shankly Kop of Deepdale. The total project cost was estimated at £12m. A ground-breaking ceremony took place on 26 September 1998 by Sepp Blatter of FIFA with the Rt Hon Chris Smith MP, the Secretary of State for Culture, Media and Sport, in attendance. The foundation stone was laid by Bryan Gray and Ben Casey (who had persuaded Baxi to buy PNE) in April 2000. Finally the National Football Museum was officially opened on 21 June 2001 by the Duke of Kent. Bryan Gray, the founding chairman of trustees, stood down in September 2001 to be succeeded by Brian Booth.

Rob Pratten was the first employee of the Football Museum: he joined the team in May 1995 and for some time was the only employee. Kevin Moore was appointed Director in August 1997 and was later joined by Mark Bushell, Hugh Hornby and Lindsey Jones. The museum's first site was outside Deepdale, Preston, Lancashire. Deepdale was particularly significant as it is the oldest continuously used professional football ground in the world.

In 2003 the museum and the University of Central Lancashire established the International Football Institute to conduct research into historical, social and cultural aspects of football.

On a visit in 2004, Sepp Blatter, President of FIFA, commented "The National Football Museum merits my admiration as a footballer and as the President of FIFA — it is a superb realisation, a real jewel!". Bobby Charlton commented that he “can't think of a better museum anywhere in the world.” and Alex Ferguson "Each time I visit the Museum I am so impressed by the great job it does in bringing the rich history of football to life". The museum received the award of Large Visitor Attraction of the Year, at the 2005 Lancashire and Blackpool Tourism Awards.

In December 2008, chairman of the Football League, Brian Mawhinney caused controversy when he suggested that the Museum should be moved from Preston to Wembley Stadium in order to attract more visitors. Founder Kevin Moore, stated that it had been an aim to have an exhibition at Wembley, but stated that the trustee's policy was to have its headquarters in Preston.

=== Manchester ===
Despite critical acclaim and attracting 100,000 visitors per year, funding was repeatedly an issue. In 2007, it had an income of £791,256 against out-goings of £1,231,195. The trustees were concerned about the museum's long-term future. In 2009, they approached Manchester City Council about moving the museum. The city council offered a funding package worth £2m per year for the museum to move to Manchester. Despite an improved offer of £400,000 per year from Preston and Lancashire councils, the trustees voted to move the museum to the Urbis exhibition centre in Manchester.

It was intended that subject to satisfactory funding, the Preston site would remain open as a secondary centre. However, the museum failed to agree a funding package with Lancashire County Council and the Preston site closed to the public at the end of April 2010. In 2023, the Preston site opened as a fan zone called 'The Gentry Bar.

Urbis closed in February 2010 in preparation for an intended opening of the new National Football Museum in summer 2011.

The museum reopened in Manchester on 6 July 2012. The new museum aimed to attract 350,000 visitors per year. It was reported in August 2012 that the new National Football Museum attracted over 100,000 visitors in the first six weeks of opening. By the end of April 2013, the museum reached its 350,000 target, and was attracting 500,000 visitors by 2017. From January 2019, the museum adopted a charging model, while remaining free to city of Manchester residents.

== Building layout ==
The museum is based in the Urbis building and is laid out over 4 floors:

Some rooms of the Museum
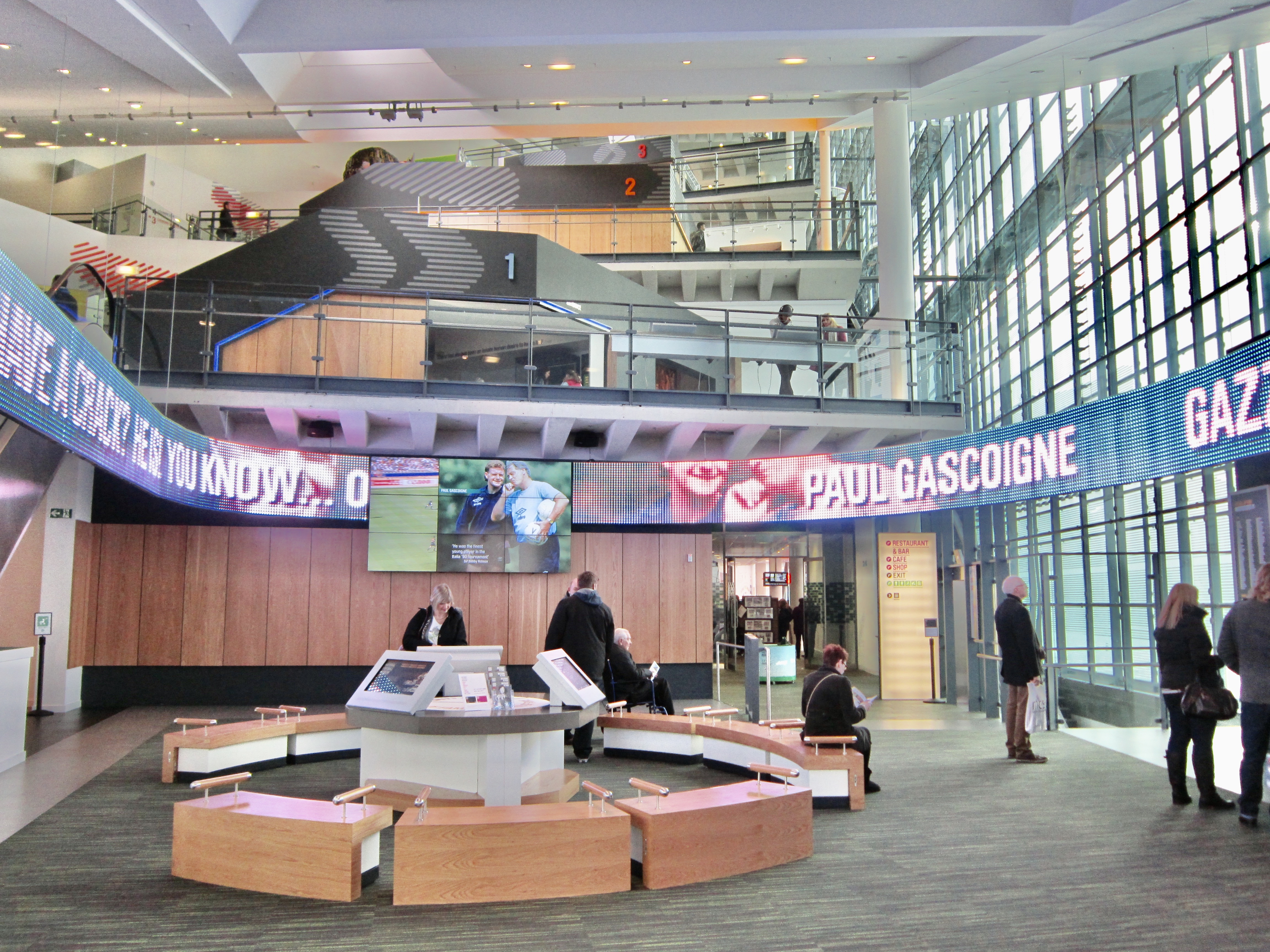
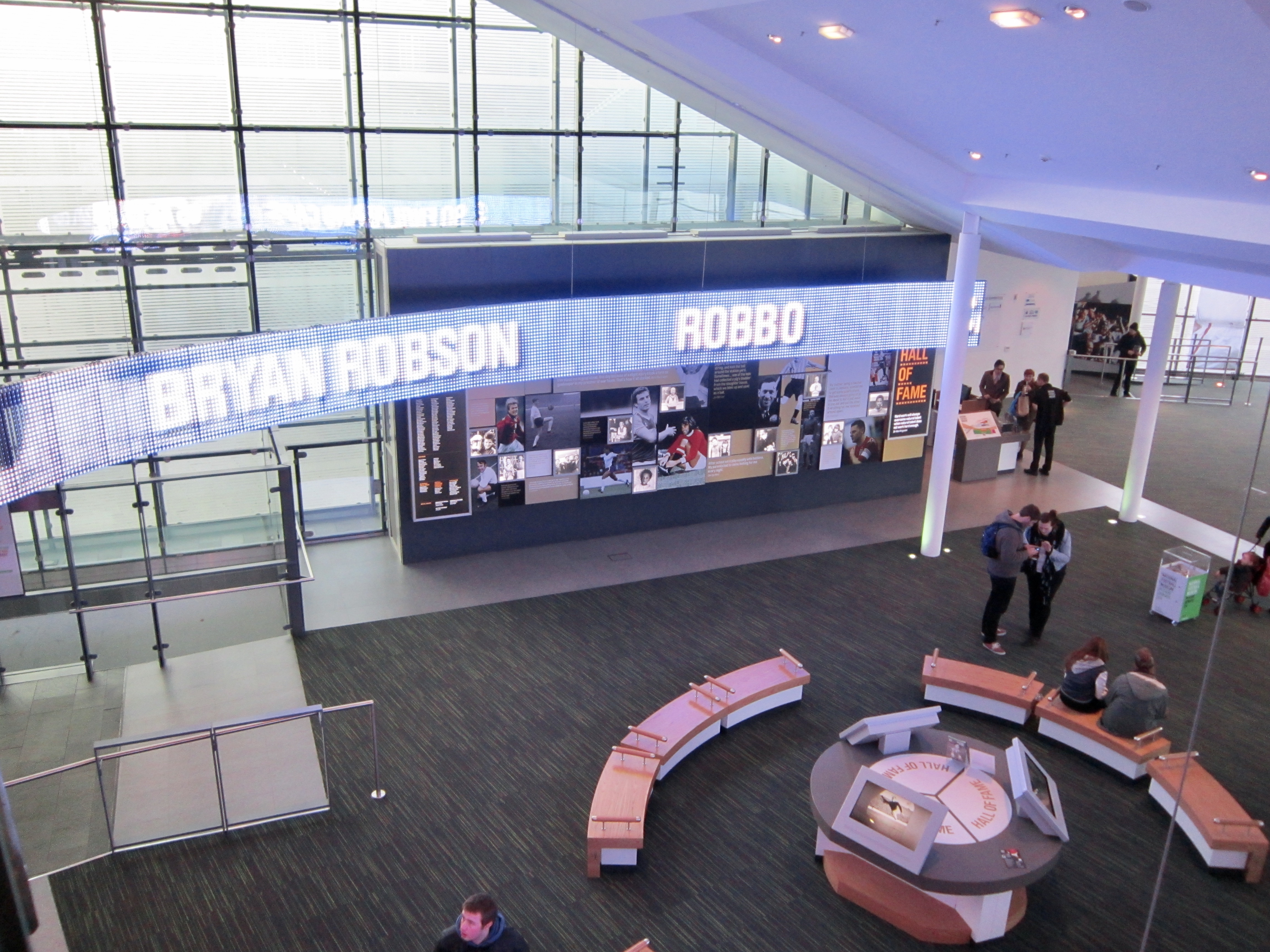
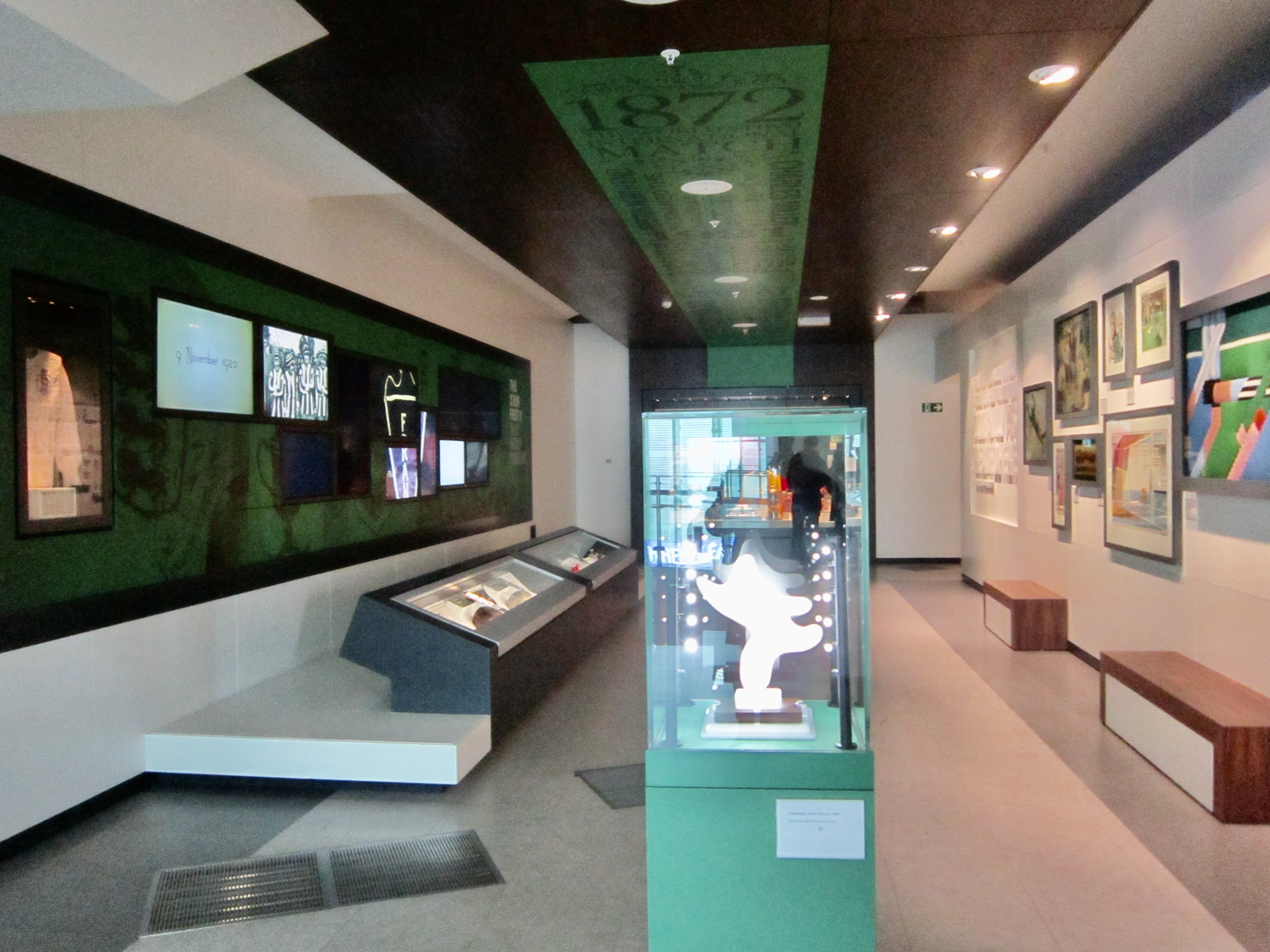
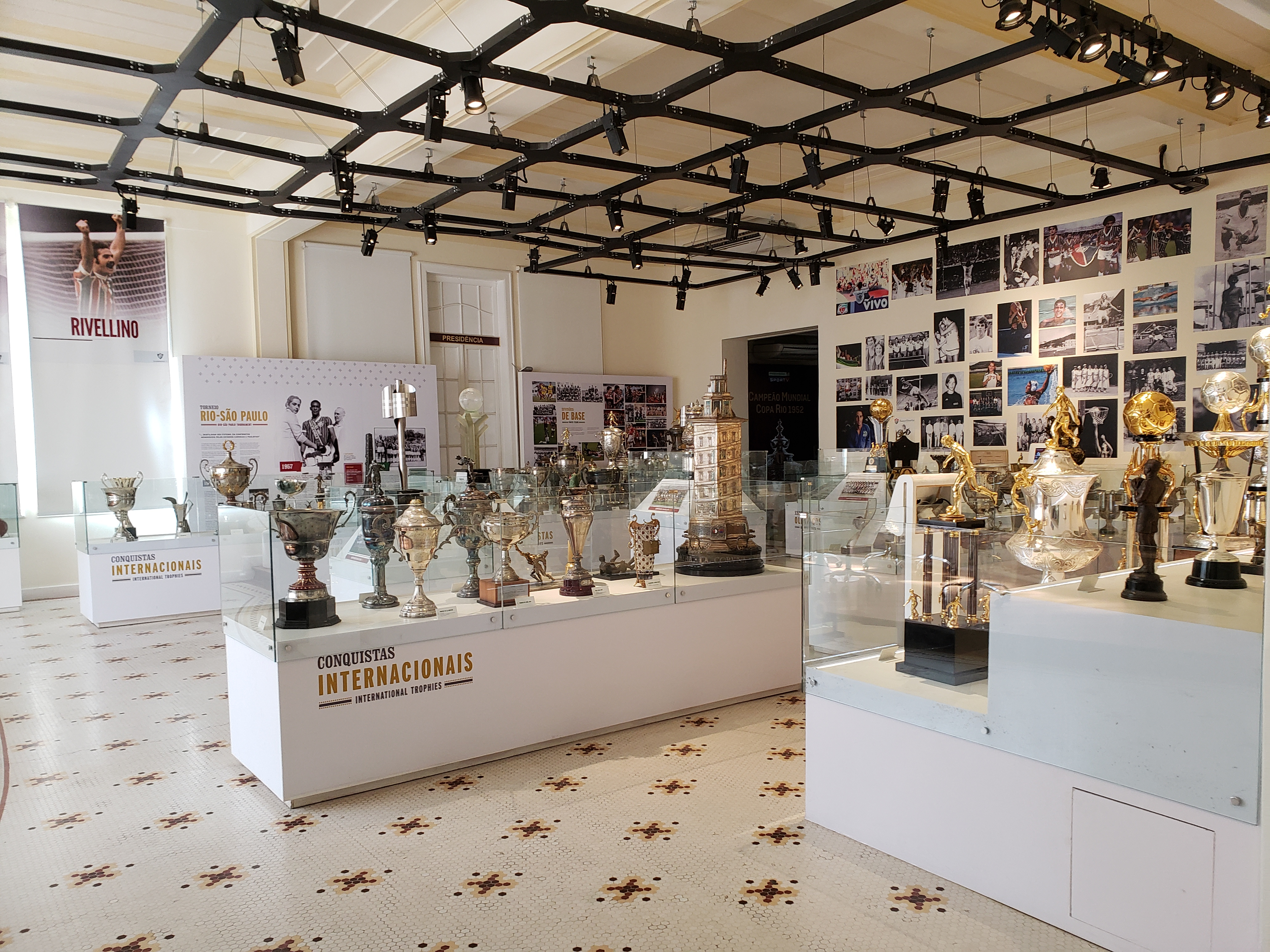

Pitch Gallery – The largest floor, housing the zones:

- Trophies – Replicas of the Women's Super League and Premier League trophies on display.
- Hall of Fame – A full list of the museum's Hall of Fame inductees.
- Changing Exhibitions – Currently 'Origins', documenting the England Men's team first football clubs.

Match Gallery – The largest floor, housing the zones:

- The Game – Features items such as the first ever rule book from 1863 and the shirt from the first ever international football match between England and Scotland.
- Fans – Including the original painting of L.S. Lowry's "Going to the Match".
- Competition – Information about the various competitions and leagues, with the original version of the FA Cup and various replica trophies.
- England on the World Stage – A section dedicated to England national men and women's teams, featuring the Jules Rimet Trophy, the match ball from the 1966 World Cup Final and Diego Maradona's "Hand of God" shirt.
- Stadiums – Information about various stadiums and designs, with an original turnstile from the old Wembley Stadium and some original wooden seats.
- Media – Featuring various footage and clippings from old matches, including a sheepskin coat worn by John Motson.
- Clubs – Interactive screens with information on most league clubs in England.
- Players – A brief look at the scope of footballers, including the only Victoria Cross won by a professional footballer and the painting "The Art of the Game" portraying Eric Cantona.
- Our Beautiful Game – A 10-minute film in a cinema showcasing a month in English football on all levels.

Play Gallery – Featuring various paid-for football interactive games, as well the zones:

- Football for All – A showcase of how football is played by people of all abilities.
- Laws – Interactive screens explaining the original rules of football and referees roles in the game.
- Managers – Audio clips from managers and the original Manager of the Year trophy.
- Toys and Games – A showcase of various football-related games and toys.
- Performance – Information about the medical side of playing football, including Willie Cunningham's knee cartilage.
- Discovery Zone – An area for under-5s to play.
- Penalty Shootout - An interactive game where visitors attempt to score past a virtual goalkeeper.

Score Gallery – A changing exhibition space. In summer 2016, it hosted an exhibition celebrating 50th anniversary of England's World Cup triumph. In 2018/2019 it hosted The Game: Thirty Years Through the Lens of Stuart Roy Clarke.

Learning and Education Zone – A dedicated learning space for school and education groups.

== Collections ==
Located at the Deepdale stadium in Preston, where the museum was open from June 2001 to March 2010, the independent charity holds the following collections at its research facility:

- The FIFA Museum Collection
- The Football Association Collection
- The Football League Collection.
- The FIFA Book Collection
- The People's Collection
- The Football Clubs Collection
- The Harry Langton Collection
- The Stanley Matthews Collection
- The Littlewoods Collection
- The Priory Collection
- The Neville Evans Collection

The Neville Evans collection forms part of the largest private collection of football memorabilia in the world. Also known as the National Football Collection, it consists of a wide range of football-related items, including the largest private collection of Tottenham Hotspur memorabilia in the world. At least 400 items are on long-term loan to the National Football Museum, with other items also being supplied to complement their in house and travelling exhibits. Started by UK businessman Neville Evans, the collection continues to grow and works to preserve and share the history of football for the next generation of fans.

- The Homes of Football – photography by Stuart Roy Clarke

At any time, around 2,500 items from the museum's collections are on display at its new home in Manchester city centre, with around a further 140,000 items held. Key items include

- Both of the two balls used in the first World Cup Final in 1930.
- The ball from the 1966 World Cup Final.
- The replica of the Jules Rimet Trophy, made in secret by the FA in 1966 after the original was stolen, and paraded by the England players at the World Cup Final in 1966.
- The England captain's jersey and cap from the world's first official international football match, Scotland vs England, in 1872.
- The world's oldest women's football kit, from the 1890s.
- The shirt worn by Maradona during the 'Hand of God goal' and The Goal of the Century.
- The original rules of association football written down when The Football Association was formed in 1863 in the Freemasons Tavern, London.

== Gallery ==
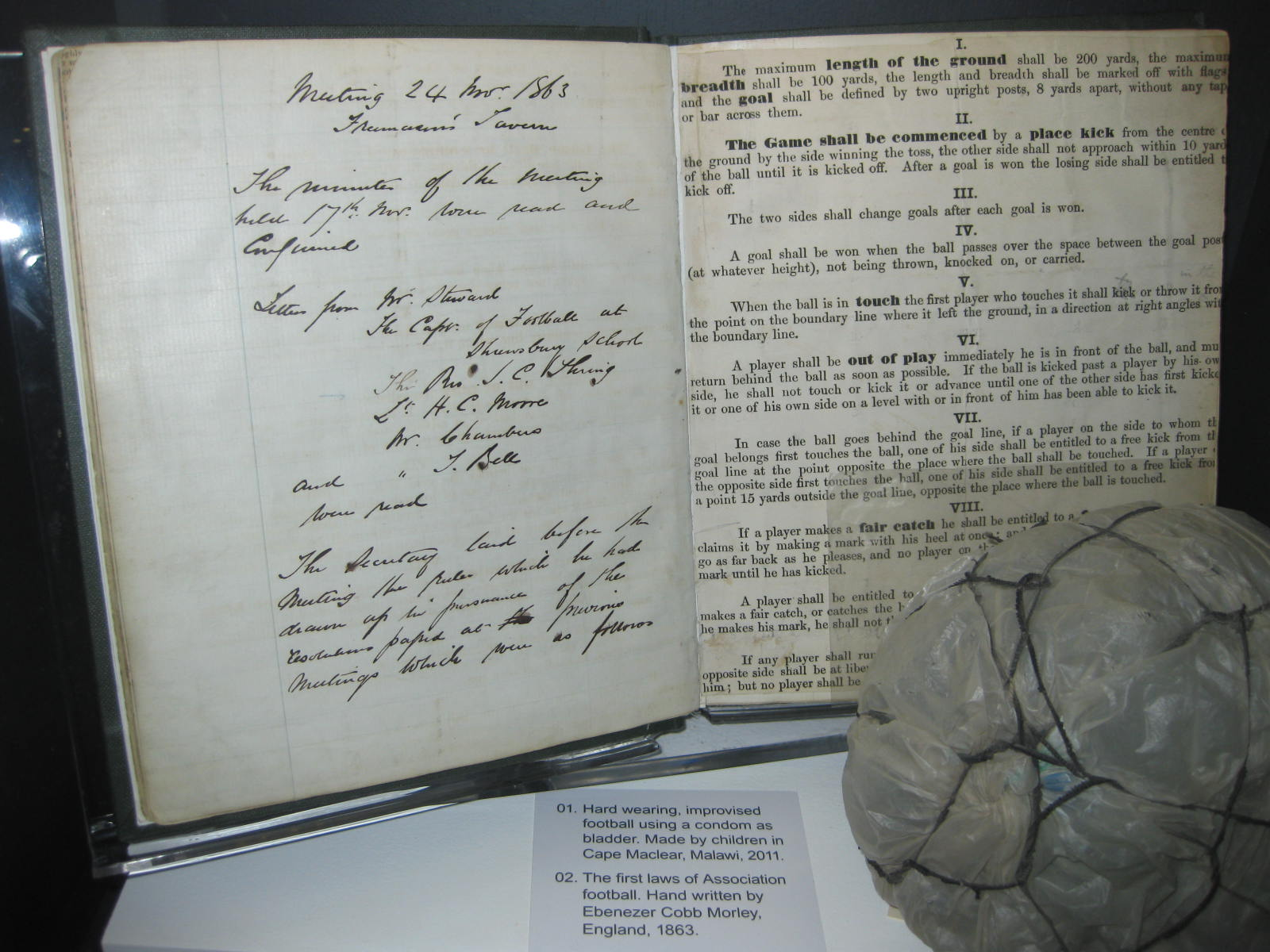
The original 'Laws of the game' drafted for and behalf of The Football Association in 1863

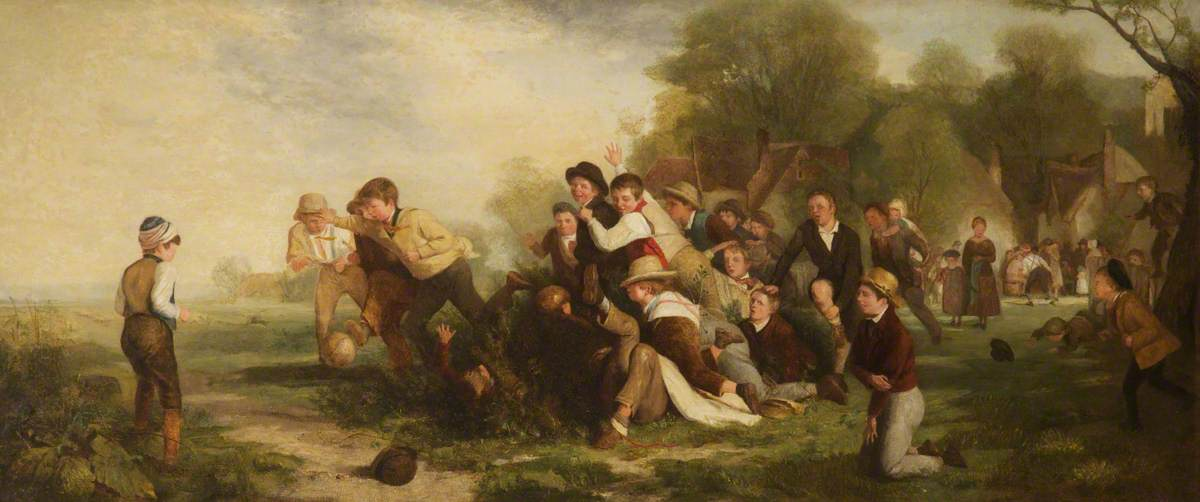
The Football Game, 1839 painting by Thomas Webster

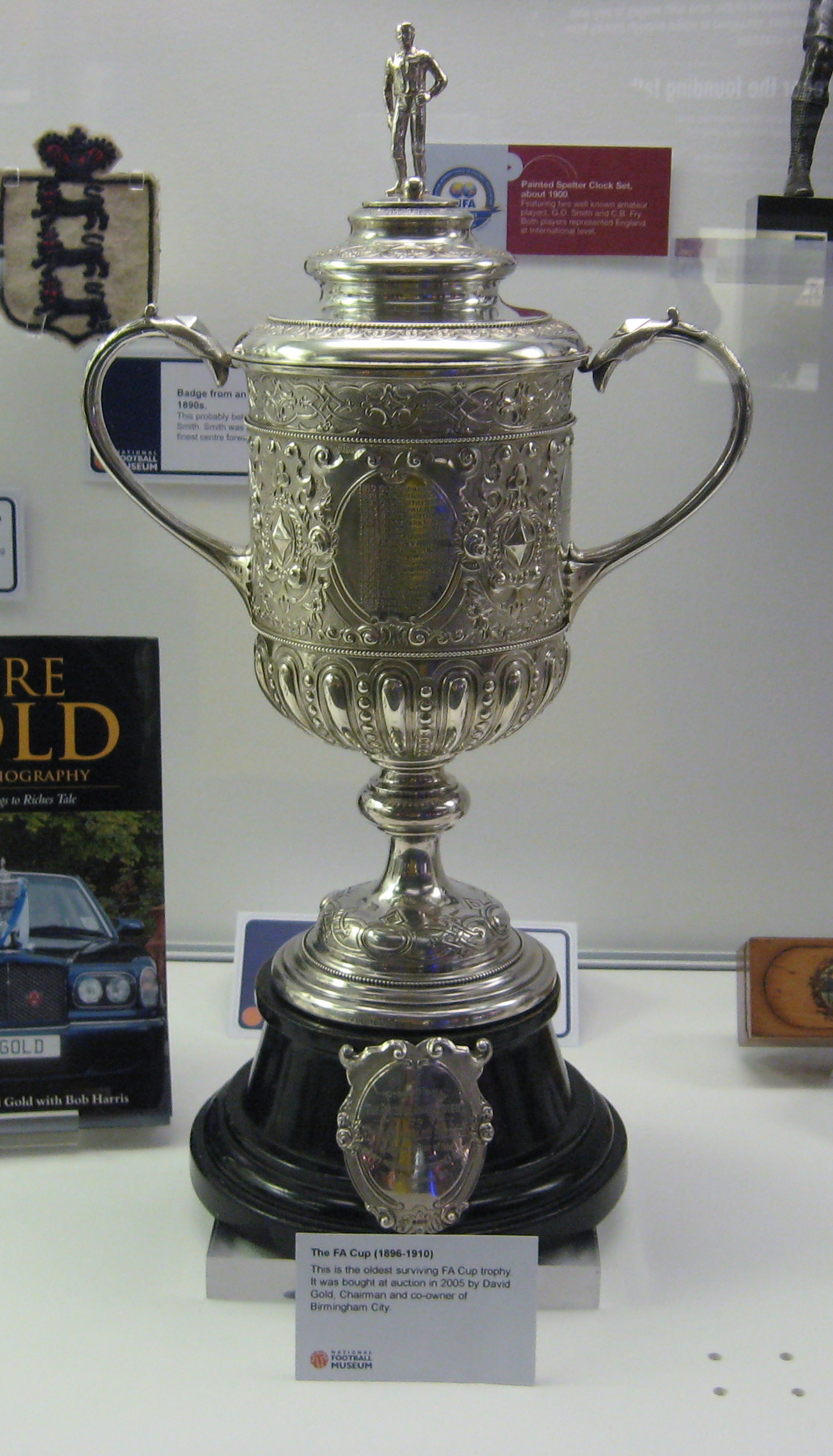
The oldest surviving FA Cup trophy (1896-1910)

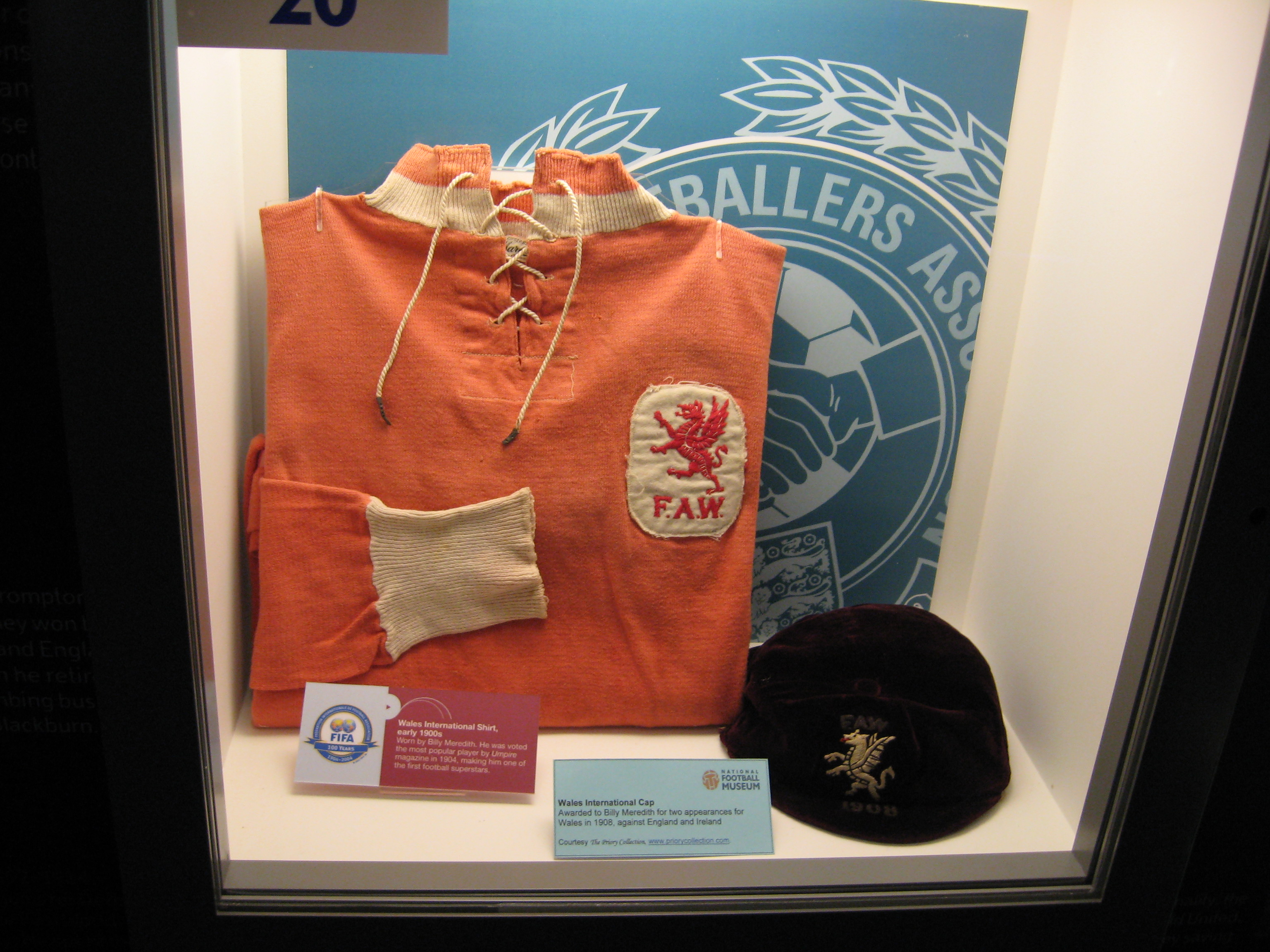
Wales shirt which worn by Billy Meredith against England and Ireland in 1908

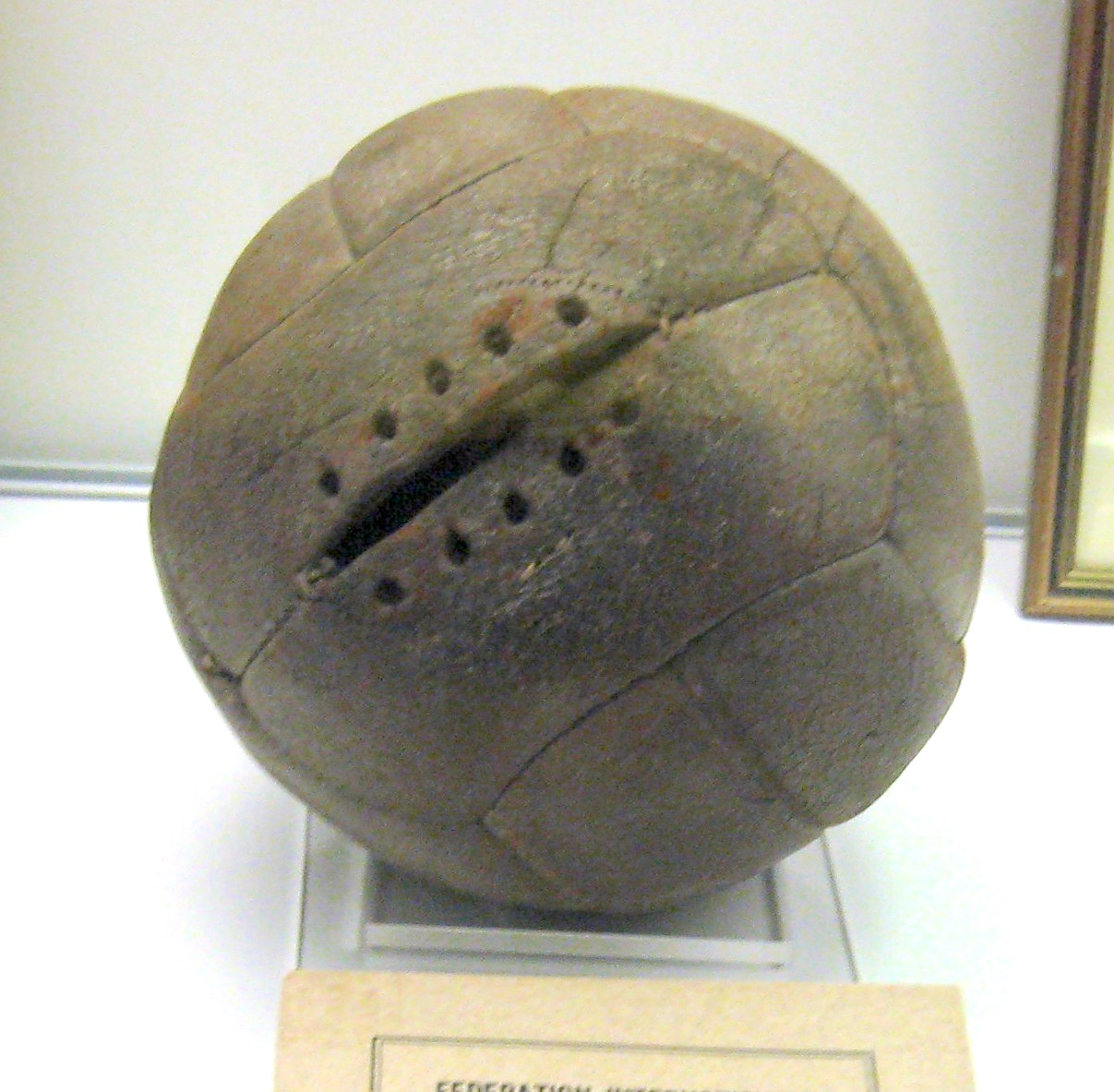
Football used in the 1930 World Cup Final, chosen by the Argentine team and used in the first half

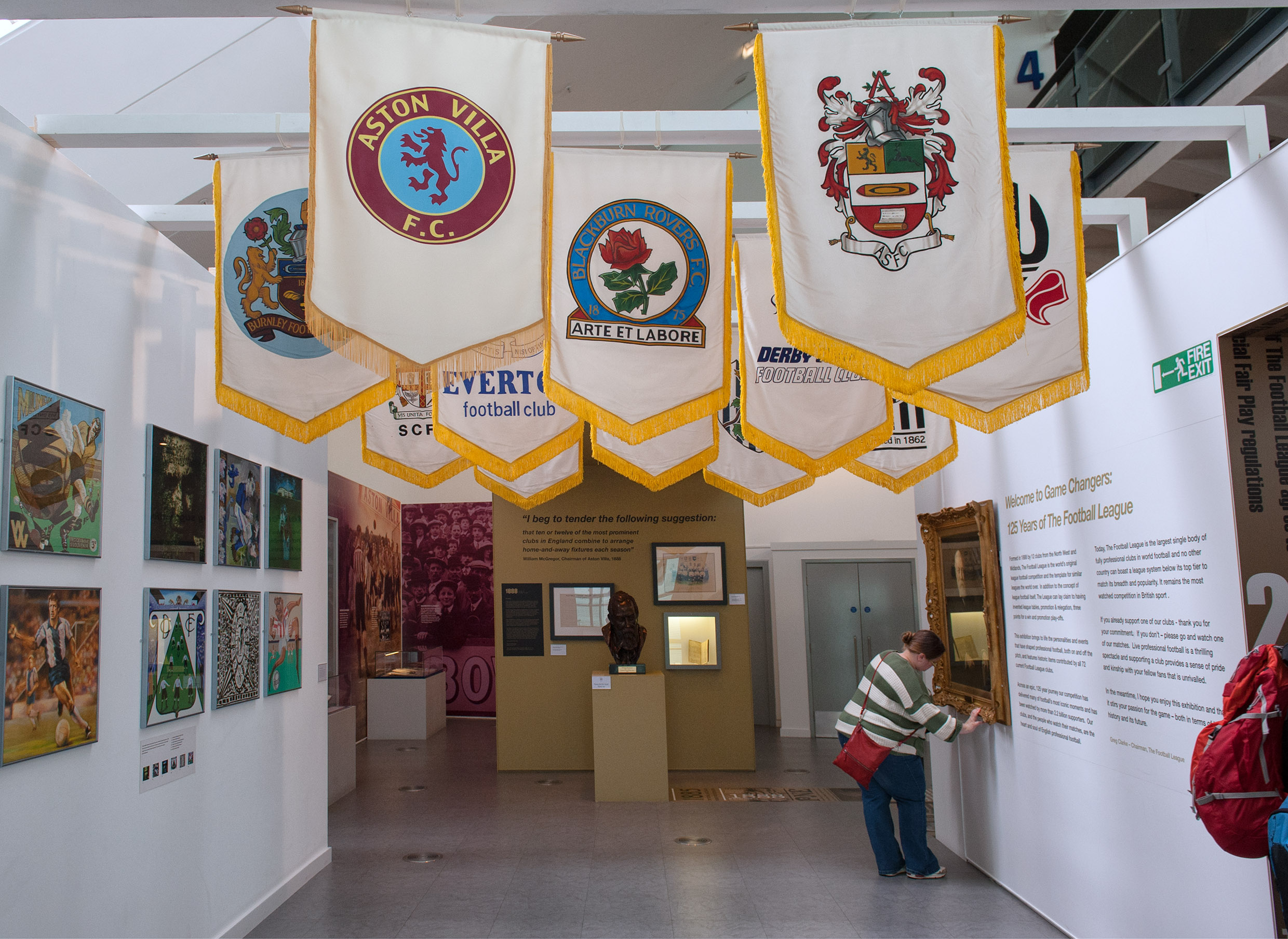
Club Pennants of the Football League's founder members

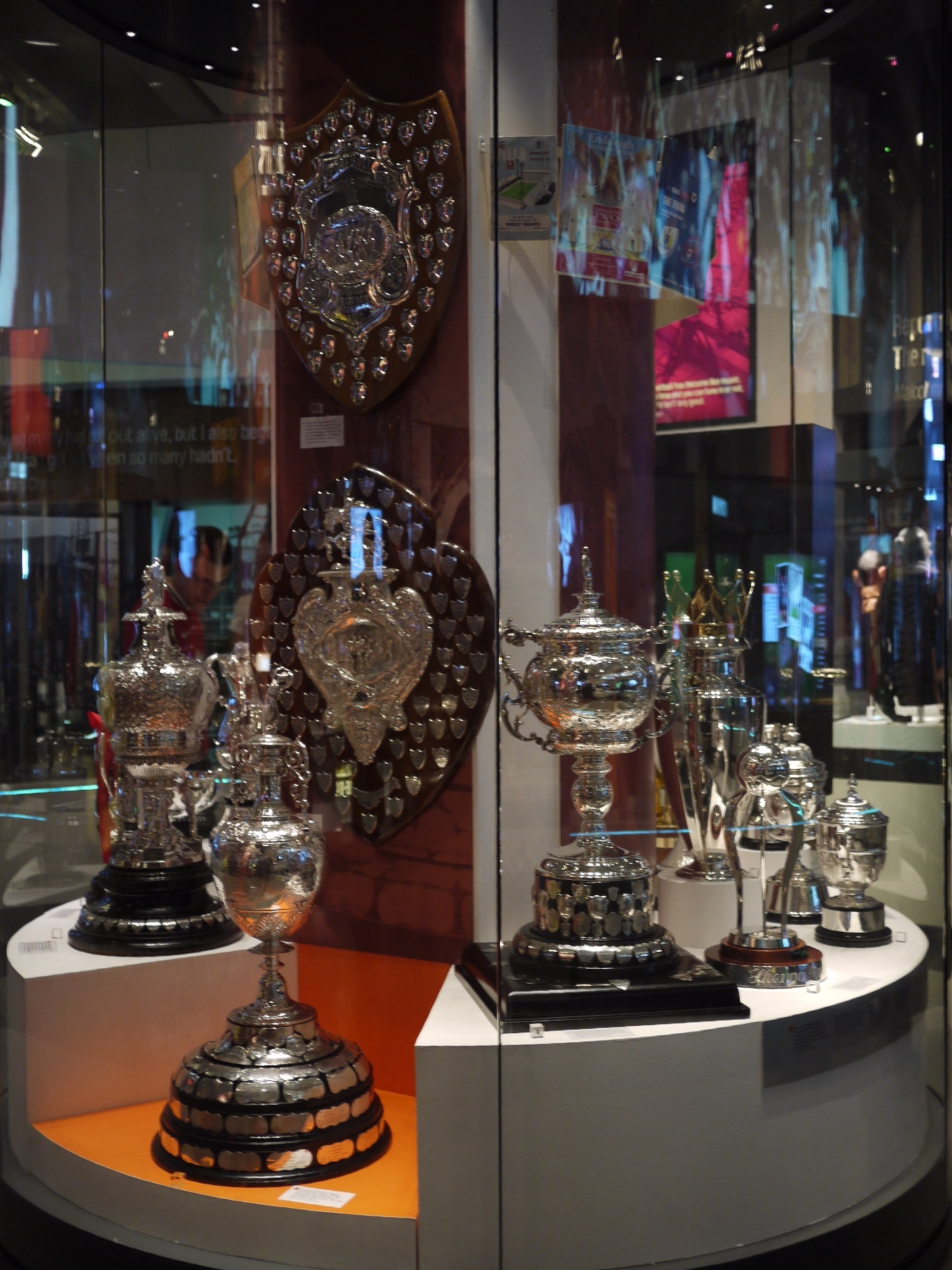
Trophies and awards

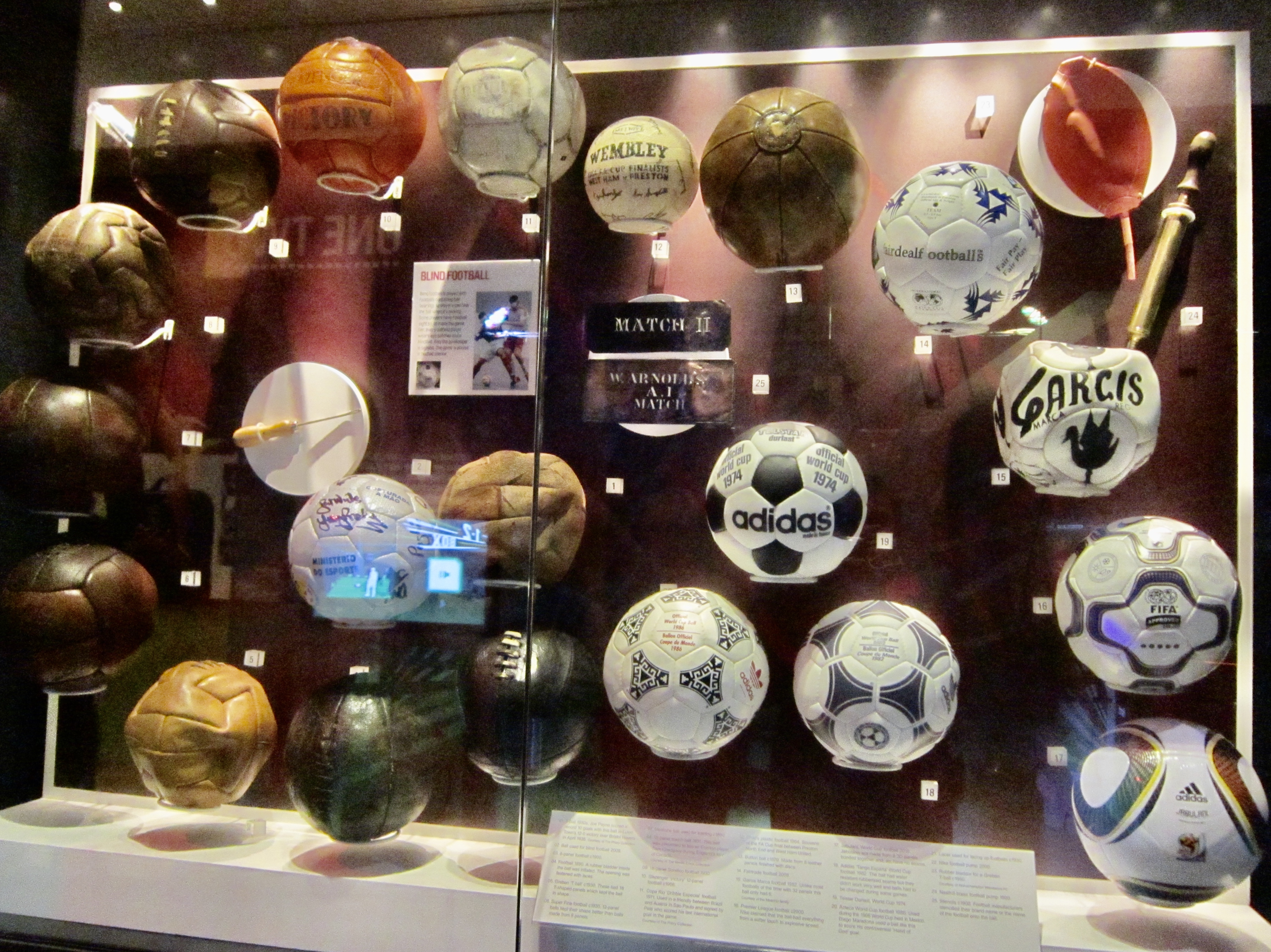
Footballs

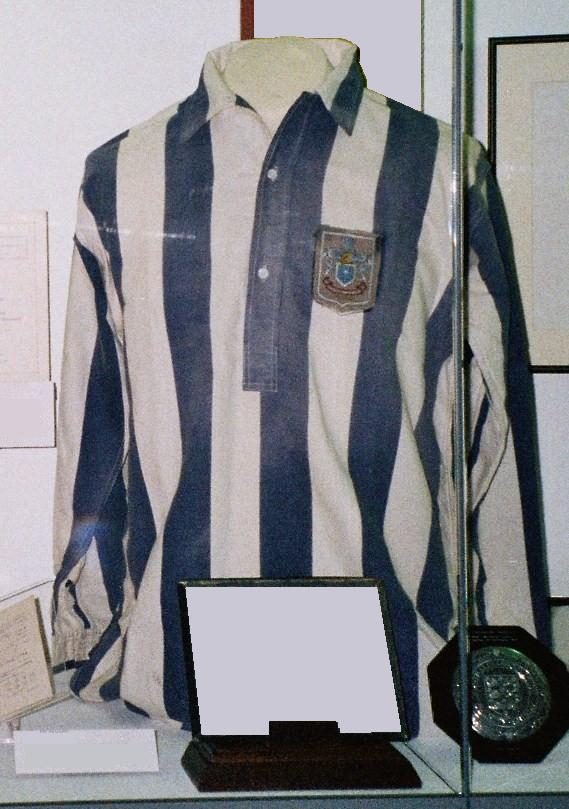
West Bromwich Albion F.C. shirt from the 1954 FA Cup final

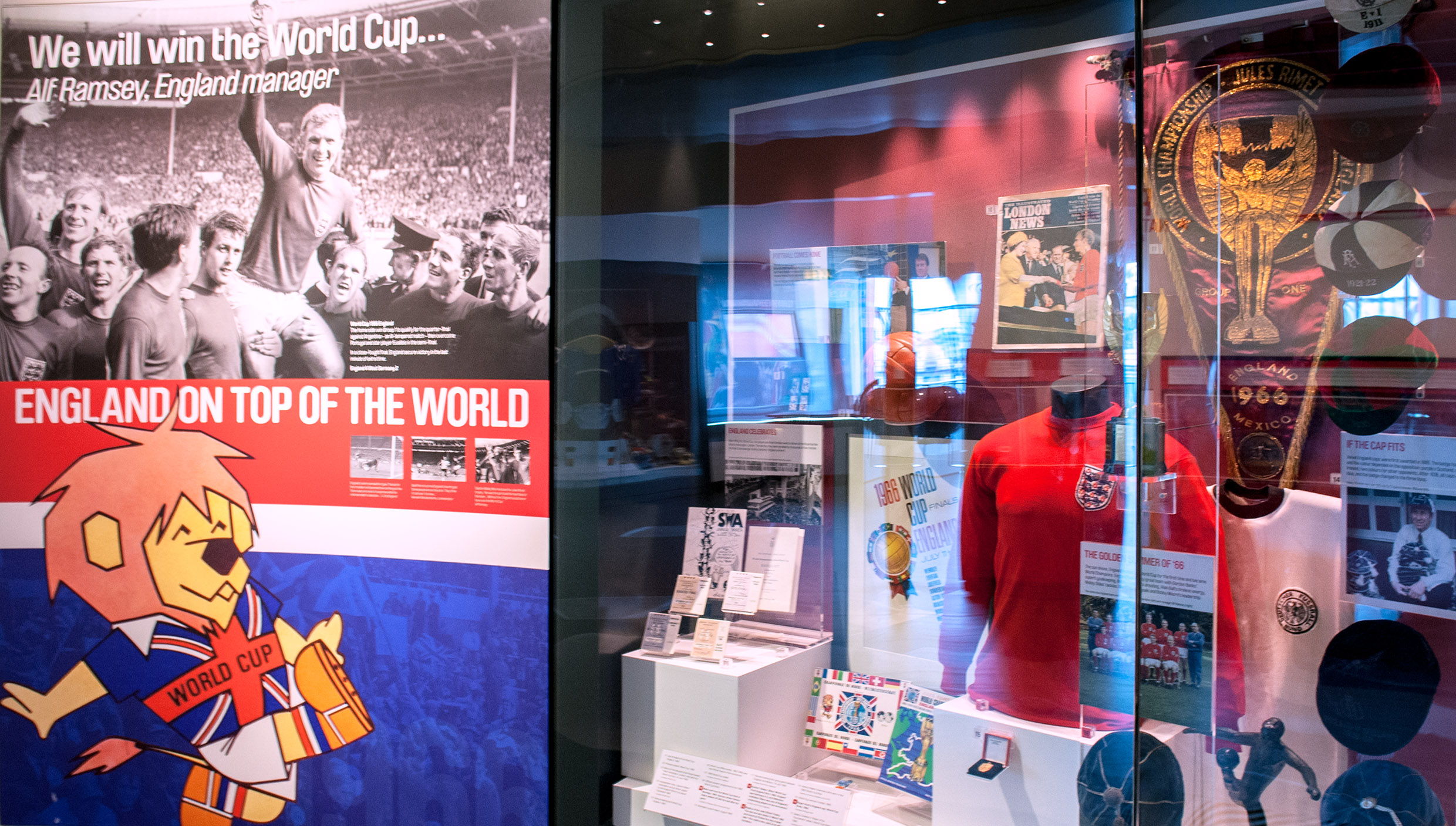
1966 World Cup memorabilia

(World Cup)

== Exhibitions ==
Many exhibits are loaned to museums in the UK and artifacts have been loaned to exhibitions in Germany, Portugal, Switzerland and Belgium. The museum has worked in partnership with UEFA to create the UEFA Jubilee Exhibition, which opened in the European Parliament in Brussels, before moving to the National Football Museum. The museum also worked with UEFA to create the world's first exhibition dedicated to women's football, to coincide with the UEFA Euro 2005 Women's Championship. To mark the 2006 FIFA World Cup the museum worked with partners to develop exhibitions in Hong Kong and Germany. A special exhibition "Saved for the Nation: The Story of the FA Cup" which featured the oldest surviving FA Cup trophy, used during FA Cup Finals between 1896 and 1910, was launched in May 2006.

The museum's temporary exhibitions programme has also included "One for All: All for One", a photographic exhibition highlighting the work of Philip Colvin, documenting the experiences and challenges of disabled Crystal Palace supporter Samuel Burch as he travelled across the country in support of his team); and "The Greater Game: Football and The First World War", exploring the role football played at home and at the front during the war years, and explores the myths and reality of famous stories from the conflict, including a previously unseen diary detailing the events of the famous Christmas Truce of 1914, as well as lost footage from the front and of wartime football.

- Saved for the Nation: The Story of the FA Cup – May 2006
- One for All: All for One – March 2007 to June 2007
- The Greater Game: Football and The First World War – December 2014
- Out of Play: Technology in Football – May 2015
- Ferenc Puskás: The World's Greatest Goalscorer – September 2015
- Pitch to Pixel: The World of Football Gaming – October 2015 to June 2016
- 1966 World Cup Exhibition – June 2016 to April 2017
- Pelé: Art Life Football – May 2017 to March 2018
- The Game: Thirty Years Through the Lens of Stuart Roy Clarke – March 2018 – March 2019
- Strip! How Football Got Shirty – 22 November 2019 – 7 June 2020
- Admiral 50 Years of Inventing Replica – June 2024 to July 2024

== Publications ==
- Hornby, Hugh (2010), Eyewitness Football, Dorling Kindersley, ISBN 9781405366021
- Galvin, Robert; Bushell, Mark; Charlton, Bobby (1 October 2005), Football's Greatest Heroes: The National Football Museum Hall of Fame, Robson, ISBN 9781861059048
- Radnedge, Keir; Bushell, Mark; Lineker, Gary (1 April 2006), Treasures of the World Cup, Carlton Books Limited, ISBN 1844423212

== See also ==
- English Football Hall of Fame, which is housed at the museum
