= Harry Langton Collection =

Collection of cultural and sporting items relating to the history of football and rugby

Coordinates: 53°29′08″N 2°14′31″W

The Harry Langton Collection includes cultural and sporting items relating to the history of football and forms the core of both the National Football Museum in Manchester, England and the World Rugby Museum, housed in the South Stand of Twickenham Stadium.

It was created by Harry Langton (10 November 1929 – 6 September 2000), a sports journalist, after he took early retirement in 1972 from the Daily Express, a British newspaper, to launch Sports Design, a business publishing and selling sporting prints in London.

With premises in Islington and the Camden Passage antique market on his doorstep, Langton soon ventured into dealing in old sporting prints, paintings and antiques. There was little market then for football, his own special interest, and over the last two decades of the century he gradually built up a vast quantity of football art and antiques illustrating the long, and global, history of the game. All codes were included.

In 1981 an early display of this collection was viewed and praised by Sir Stanley Rous, the former Secretary of the Football Association, which encouraged further collecting with the idea of making it available to a wider public. Already it was attracting attention abroad. Some exhibits traveled to Germany for the opening of a Munich bank. Others appeared as black and white photographs at 'Fussball in der Vitrine' at the Galerie Littmann in Baumleingasse Basel in May 1982. In the spring of 1987 after many fruitless applications to municipal authorities for exhibition space, Sports Design presented 'Football Art – the Langton Collection' at the Wingfield Sporting Gallery in south-west London.

Serious recognition arrived when the Tyne and Wear Museums Service joined the Langton Collection with the 'Soccer in Tyne and Wear 1879-1988 Exhibition' in Newcastle. This ran for two months before moving to Sunderland in January 1989. There it was viewed by an Italian promoter who proposed taking it to Italy for the 1990 Football World Cup. Transported to Rome it was ceremoniously opened at the Spazio Peroni by Silvio Berlusconi, one of whose companies, Gruppo Fininvest, was the major sponsor, and drew visitors throughout the tournament.

The following year, to mark the 1991 Rugby World Cup, an exhibition of specifically rugby and old (pre soccer) football art and objects was hosted by the auctioneers Christie's at their South Kensington rooms. The Rugby Football Union later bought the specifically rugby items for the World Rugby Museum. The entire collection crossed the Atlantic in 1994 for the next World Cup. Organised by an American company, the SPI Group, it was displayed at Sotheby's in New York City.

By this time problems of moving and preserving the large collection prompted an agreement with SPI that if a suitable buyer could be found it was for sale. Thus the Langton collection eventually became the FIFA Museum Collection in 1996. With support from the Heritage Lottery Fund and the efforts of Bryan Gray, the chairman of Preston North End F.C. it formed the major part of the National Football Museum, opened in Deepdale Preston in February 2001.

After the sale of the main collection to FIFA, Langton continued to acquire works in his capacity as consultant. These pieces were designed to fill gaps and not to be comprehensive in themselves. Although Langton was closely involved with the Preston museum, he died in September 2000 before it opened.

In 2006, his widow, Ann Langton (9 September 1929 – 12 February 2013), compiled a collection of poetry relating to football, called Saved, A Rare Anthology of Football from Homer to Gazza, which was launched at the National Football Museum's Hall of Fame Awards in Liverpool.

Financial problems led to a decision to relocate the National Football Museum to the Urbis building in Manchester, which reopened on 6 July 2012.

After the death of Langton's widow Ann in February 2013, the Director of the National Football Museum, Kevin Moore, wrote to her family that: "Without Harry, supported by Ann, there would have been no FIFA Collection and therefore no National Football Museum, and therefore both we and the nation as a whole owe them both a great debt of gratitude."

In early 2016 the FIFA Museum Collection was renamed The FIFA-Langton collection by FIFA and NFM. This was in order to avoid confusion between the collection and those of the newly opened FIFA World Football Museum at Enge in Zurich and to better recognise the founding work by Harry Langton in football history and art appreciation.
