= Stuart Roy Clarke =

English documentary photographer and author

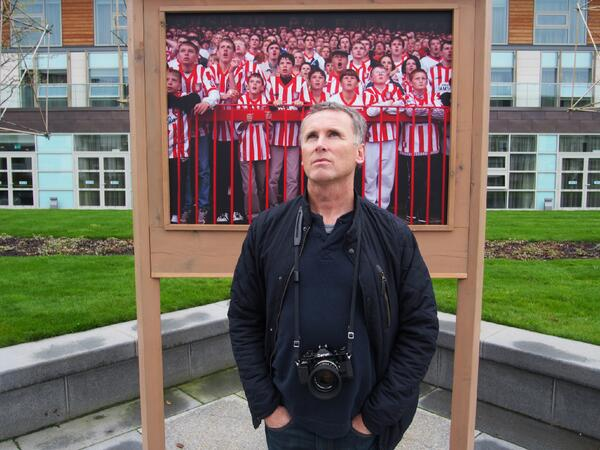
Clarke at Saint George's Park in front of his photograph, "Looking Up"

Stuart Roy Clarke is an English documentary photographer, author, exhibition-artist, speaker. His major works include The Homes of Football and Cumbria Surrounded and Glastonbury All Mine.

== Career ==
After several years of working for local newspapers in Hertfordshire and as a freelance photographer for the magazine Time Out in London, Clarke went to live in The Lake District, where he began The Homes of Football in 1990.

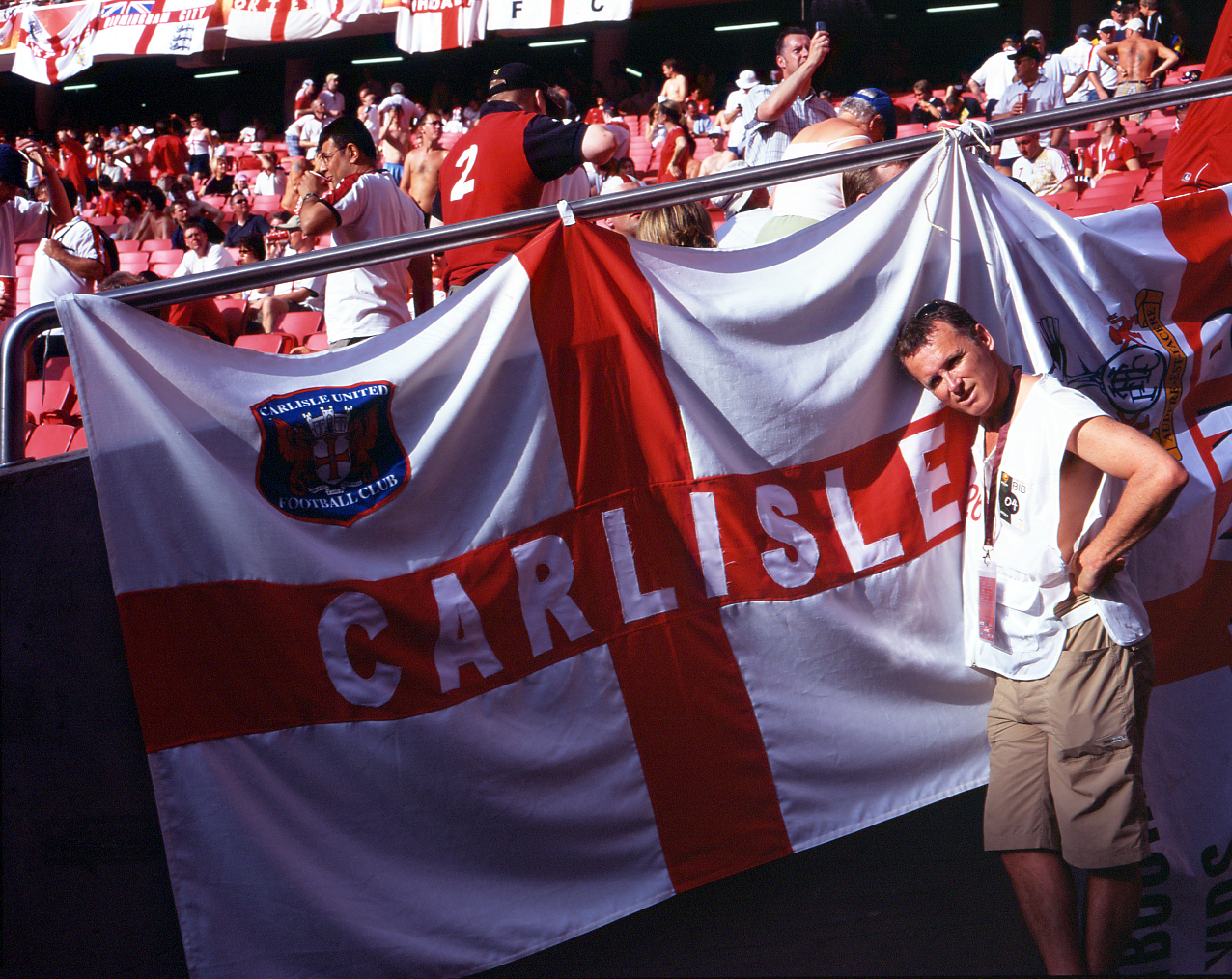
Clarke on photographic assignment in front of Carlisle flag at an England football match abroad in 2004

The football opus, documenting the changing face of the game, was self-funded initially but then evolved into a touring exhibition hired by various municipalities and shown in 80 museums and art galleries over a 15-year period. In 1997 Clarke also opened a permanent gallery to his football work in Ambleside, in the English Lake District. The gallery closed in 2012.

== Exhibitions ==
=== Exhibitions (UK unless specified) ===
- 1991: The Homes of Football, Burnley Towneley Hall Art Gallery, Barrow Forum 28 Gallery, Leeds City Museum
- 1992: The Homes of Football, Stoke Museum & Art Gallery, Derby Metro Gallery, Birkenhead Williamson Museum & Art Gallery, Coventry Herbert Museum & Art Gallery, Bath F-Stop Gallery, Wigan History Shop Museum, Hove Museum & Art Gallery, Bournemouth Russell Cotes Museum & Art Gallery, Scunthorpe Museum & Art Gallery
- 1993: The Homes of Football, Maidstone Library Gallery, Bilston Museum & Art Gallery, Aylesbury County Museum, Durham DLI Art Gallery, Fulham Library Gallery, Mansfield Museum & Art Gallery, Peterborough Museum & Art Gallery, Huddersfield Art Gallery, Westminster House of Commons (one day only), Hitchin Museum & Art Gallery, Middlesbrough Art Gallery, Southend Focal Point Gallery, Blackburn Museum & Art Gallery, Guernsey Museum & Art Gallery, Salford Museum & Art Gallery, Milton Keynes Exhibition Gallery
- 1994: The Homes of Football, High Wycombe Guildhall, Grimsby Heritage Centre, Swansea Industrial Museum, Belfast Ulster Museum, Carlisle Tullie House Museum & Art Gallery
- 1995: The Homes of Football, Bradford Industrial Museum, Warrington Museum & Art Gallery
- 1996: The Homes of Football, Reading Museum & Art Gallery, Edinburgh City Arts Centre, Liverpool Museum of Liverpool Life, Coatbridge Summerlee Heritage Park
- 1997: The Homes of Football, Arbroath Art Gallery, Forfar Methen Art Gallery, Paisley Museum & Art Gallery, Prescot Museum, Barnsley Cooper Gallery, Stockport Art Gallery
- 1998: The Homes of Football, Bristol Museum & Art Gallery, Kilmarnock Dick Institute, Yorkshire York Museum, Wrexham Arts Centre, Falkirk Callendar House, Birmingham Mac
- 1999: The Homes of Football, Holyhead Arts Centre, Dunfermline Pittencrief Museum, Kirkcaldy Museum & Art Gallery, Exeter Museum & Art Gallery, Cheltenham Museum, Dumfries Museum & Art Gallery, Stranraer Museum, Kirkcudbright Museum, Lincoln Usher Gallery, Luton Artezium, London RIBA
- 2000: The Homes of Football, Gillingham Library, Strood Library, Solihull Arts Complex, Oldham Museum & Art Gallery, Darlington Art Gallery, Hull Ferens Art Gallery, Watford Museum, Wakefield Art Gallery
- 2001: The Homes of Football, Leamington Spa Museum, Sheffield Galleries, Warrington Museum
- 2002: The Homes of Football, Leicester Museum, South Shields Museum, Coventry Herbert Art Gallery, Leeds Corn Exchange, Bolton Museum & Art Gallery
- 2003: The Homes of Football, Cardiff St.David's Hall, Sunderland Art Gallery, Salford Lowry Outlet, Reading Museum & Art Gallery, Shrewsbury Museum
- 2004: The Homes of Football / Football in our Time, Gateshead Library, Lisbon University Portugal, Bristol Museum & Art Gallery, Norwich Forum
- 2012: The Homes of Football, National Football Museum, Manchester
- 2013: The Homes of Football / True Colours, National Football Museum, Manchester
- 2014: The Homes of Football / Northern League 125, National Football Museum, Manchester
- 2018 - 2019 The Game, National Football Museum, Manchester
- 2021 Football During Lockdown, with Amazon Prime, Manchester Cathedral Gardens
- 2024 The Homes of Football Projected Large, The Printworks, Manchester

=== Semi-permanent exhibitions ===
- 1997–2011: The Homes of Football at Ambleside: three-storey Museum
- 2001–2007: Homes of Football: At The Football Association HQ London
- 2014–2019: The Homes of Football: In the Courtyard of FA Centre of Excellence, St George's Park National Football Centre

==== Critical response ====
Football commentator John Motson called the work "a unique and wonderful collection of football scenes. Stuart Clarke puts a new perspective on the game". Former player and manager Bryan Robson said that "Stuart Clarke has brought to life the international game of football with a series of outstanding, innovative and often witty photographs". Former Prime Minister and Newcastle United F.C. supporter Tony Blair called the Homes of Football "a must for any football fan. It is an excellent collection of outstanding photographs which truly capture the passion of the game. It really is a gem".

== Books ==
- The Homes of Football (1996)
- Passion of A Nation (1999), Little Brown & Co
- More Than A Game (2001), Random House
- Football In Our Time (2003), Mainstream
- England The Light (2004), Giant Step
- Scenes From A British Summer Country Pop Music Festival (2010), SRC
- Cumbria Surrounded (Somewhere Across A Promised Land) (2010), SRC
- The Cradle of The Game (2010), SRC
- The Homes of Football / Where the Heart Is (2013), Bluecoat
- Britische Fussballkultur in Den 90er Jahren (2014), Panorama
- The Game (2018), Bluecoat
- The Game Revisited (2019), Bluecoat
- The Game (2020), Relegation Press
- Football During Lockdown (2021), Amazon Prime Sports
- Glastonbury All Mine (2023), Relegation Press

== Television ==
- A Common Passion (1996), ITV written and presented by Stuart Clarke
- Splendid Isolation (2000), ITV written and presented by Stuart Clarke
- The Homes of Football / Stuart Roy Clarke (2012), Northern Stars / National Football Museum / British Sea Power
- The Homes of Football / Inside Out (2013), BBC1
- The Homes of Football / True Colours (2013), FIFA Football Mundial
- Stuart Roy Clarke / Sport in Focus (2014), BT Sport
- Christmas University Challenge (2018) / ITV Studios, BBC2
- German World Cup Summer Recalled (2025), 11mm Football Film Festival Berlin

== Mentions in published works ==
- Football In Wind And Rain (The Making Of The British Game), John Williams
- The Story Of Football in 100 Objects, National Football Museum
