= World Rugby (video game) =

1993 video game

- Developers: Brendan O'Brien, David Taylor
- Publisher: Zeppelin Games
- Platforms: ZX Spectrum, C64, Atari ST, Amiga
- Release: 1993
- Genre: Sports Management
- Mode: Single Player

World Rugby is a sports management video game developed by Brendan O'Brien and David Taylor. It was published by Zeppelin Games in 1993 for the ZX Spectrum and Commodore 64. This was Zeppelin's last release for the 8-bit home computer market.

== Critical reaction ==
Your Sinclair awarded World Rugby 72%, praising good presentation the originality of a rugby management game, but criticising the poor graphics in the match highlights. Sinclair User awarded 80%, highlighting the accuracy and range of the player database but advising non-fans of the management genre to stay away.
