= World Rugby Museum =

Sports museum in London, England

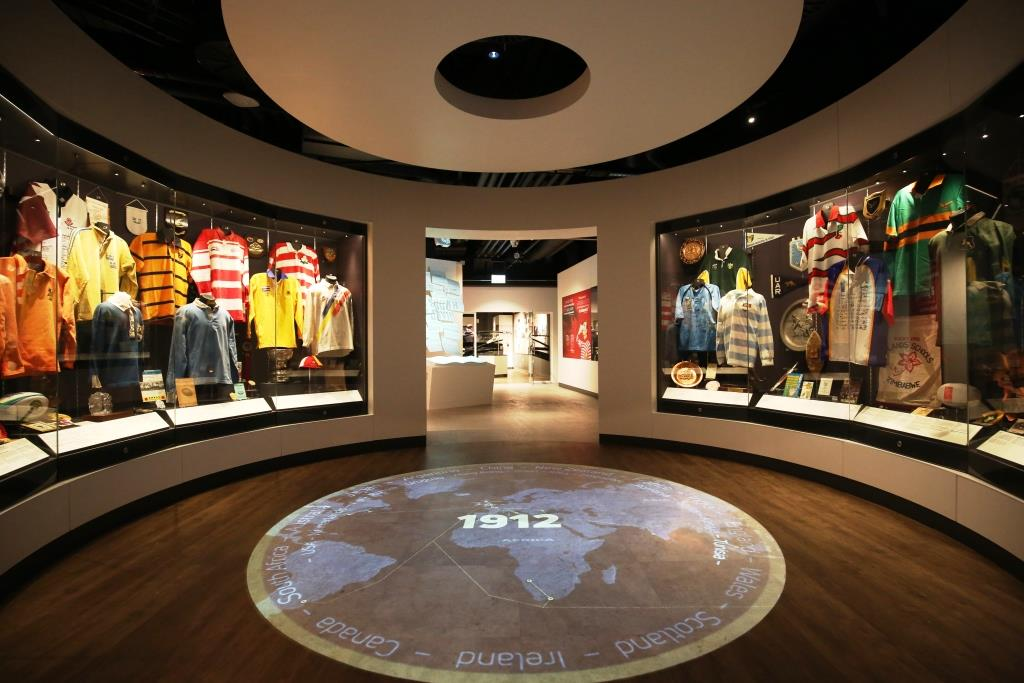
- The "Sport of Empire and the World" gallery

- Location within Greater London
- Established: 1996
- Location: Twickenham Stadium, Richmond upon Thames
- Coordinates: 51.45502°N 0.34049°W
- Website: https://www.worldrugbymuseum.com

The World Rugby Museum is a sports museum in the South Stand of Twickenham Stadium, London, England. Its collection comprises over 37,000 pieces of rugby memorabilia, boots, balls, jerseys, programmes, match-tickets, books and assorted paraphernalia.

The museum was first opened as The Museum of Rugby, in 1996, becoming the World Rugby Museum in 2007. It re-opened in early February 2018.

== Exhibitions ==
The World Rugby Museum has several fluid exhibition spaces in which it rotates objects from its collection and curates a regular programme of special exhibitions.

Past exhibitions have included: HQ at 100, One Century Hundreds of Moments. More Than A Tour, the 1905 All-Blacks. Core Values: The Life and Work of Gerald Laing. England 2010, the Women's Rugby World Cup. Lest We Forget: Rugby and the First World War. Brave Blossoms: The History of Rugby in Japan.

Permanent exhibitions include: The 1871 Room, Amateurs and Professionals, Wartime Rugby, 6-Nations Gallery, Rugby World Cup and What Kind of Rugby Player Are You Interactive Gallery.

== Education ==
The World Rugby Museum’s education facilities predominantly comprise its ‘Workshops and Seminars’ programme.

Workshops involve a series of hands-on, curriculum-focused active-learning sessions, such as: ‘Rugby Strips & Textiles’, ‘What Kind of Rugby Player Are You?’ and ‘Stadium Director.

Seminars are delivered by professionals from within the Rugby Football Union and include: ‘Twickenham Control’, ‘Commercial Twickenham’ and ‘History of Rugby and Football in Britain'.

‘Workshops and Seminars’ received the Sandford Award for Heritage Education in 2010, 2015 and 2020.

== Collections ==
World Rugby Museum collection

The World Rugby Museum has the most extensive collection of rugby football memorabilia in the world and includes over 25,000 recorded objects, 7,000 pieces of archival material and 7-8,000 photographs.

It includes the RFU collection, the Harry Langton Collection and the RFU Rugby Archive.

Star items include: the Calcutta Cup, the 2003 Rugby World Cup, an 1871 England Jersey and Cap and an 1888 Anglo-Australian Tour Jersey and Cap.

The World Rugby Museum is a museum of international rugby history and includes objects from all over the globe.

=== Rugby Archive ===
The Rugby Archive consists of over 7,000 pieces of archival material including books, match-programmes, minutes and club histories.

Star items include: Rugby Football Union minutes 1871-1949, the 1907 Twickenham Stadium deeds, a photograph album relating to the first British and Irish lions Tour of South Africa in 1891, the original 'Football Rules' as produced at Rugby School in 1845 and the Rugby Football Union's 1871 'Proposed Laws of the Game'.

The archive does not operate a lending facility but students and private researchers can use the resource upon appointment.

== Twickenham Stadium Tours ==
Twickenham Stadium Tours

The World Rugby Museum operates Twickenham Stadium Tours that provide privileged access to areas within Twickenham Stadium, the English national rugby stadium.

== Rugby Football Foundation ==
The World Rugby Museum comes under the umbrella of the Rugby Football Foundation, a charitable trust established by the Rugby Football Union.

== See also ==
- Webb Ellis Rugby Football Museum - a rugby museum in the town of Rugby in Warwickshire.
- Rugby Art Gallery, Museum & Library – also in Rugby; physical home of the World Rugby Hall of Fame
- New Zealand Rugby Museum - a rugby museum in Palmerston, New Zealand
