= List of exhibitions curated by Catherine de Zegher =

Catherine de Zegher, Exhibition History

Since the late–1980s, Belgian art historian Catherine de Zegher has curated many art exhibitions, including solo and group exhibitions in museums worldwide as well as large-scale perennial exhibitions. Her curatorial work is centred on modern and contemporary art and challenges mainstream models of art and art history that have excluded the role of women in art, currently, she is focussing on the relationship between women's art and ecology and art. From 1988 to 1998, he was the co-founder and director of Kanaal Art Foundation (Kortrijk, Belgium) where she curated exhibitions on emerging international artists with an emphasis on the development of multiculturalism in Europe. Her curatorial work has received international attention and in 2017 de Zegher received the Oscarla award for her role in the art world. Since 2014, de Zegher is a member of the Royal Flemish Academy of Belgium for Science and the Arts.

== 1988–1998: Kanaal Art Foundation, Courtray ==
=== Solo exhibitions ===
Title	Artists	Year	Curator(s)	Institution / Location	Ref
Lili Dujourie: Ibant oscuri sola sub nocte per umbra	Lili Dujourie	1988–1989	Production	Bonner Kunstverein, Bonn; Le Magasin, Grenoble, France; Museum Kröller-Müller, Otterlo; Musée d’Art Moderne, Paris, produced by Kanaal Art Foundation, Courtray	
Tunga & Cildo Meireles: Lezarts/Through	Cildo Meireles, Tunga	May 5–October 22, 1989	Catherine de Zegher	Kanaal Art Foundation, Courtray	
Patrick Corillon: 150 Year Railways Gent-Kortrijk	Patrick Corillon	Sep 22–Dec 24, 1989	Catherine de Zegher	Kanaal Art Foundation at Railway Station, Courtray; traveled to Gare de l’Est, Paris, Sep 1991	
Tadashi Kawamata	Tadashi Kawamata	Oct 23, 1989–Feb 15, 1990	Catherine de Zegher	Kanaal Art Foundation at Begijnhof St-Elisabeth, Courtray	
Guy Rombouts & Monica Droste: Azart-alphabet	Guy Rombouts, Monica Droste	May 15–20, 1990	Catherine de Zegher	Kanaal Art Foundation at The Halls (Fair Child on View), Courtray; traveled to Brakke Grond, Amsterdam	
Robin Winters: Val Saint-Lambert Series	Robin Winters	June 9–Aug 26, 1990	Catherine de Zegher	Kanaal Art Foundation at Municipal Museum, Courtray	
Trudo Engels: Barney		1990		Kanaal Art Foundation, Courtray	
James Casebere & Tony Oursler: Station Project	James Casebere, Tony Oursler	Feb 20, 1991–March 29, 1992	Catherine de Zegher	Kanaal Art Foundation at Railway Station, Courtray	
Waltercio Caldas: Drawings and Sculptures	Waltercio Caldas	Nov 8–Dec 15, 1991	Catherine de Zegher	Kanaal Art Foundation at Cultural Center, Courtray; traveled to Centre d’Art Contemporain, Genève Museum Boijmans van Beuningen, Rotterdam	
David Lamelas: Quand le ciel est bas et lourd (When the Sky is Low and Heavy)	David Lamelas	1992	Catherine de Zegher	Kanaal Art Foundation, Courtray; till today: large-scale sculpture in the park of the Royal Museum for Fine Arts, Antwerp (Included in the exhibition: America, Bride of the Sun. 500 Years/Latin America and the Low Countries, 1992)	
Antoni Muntadas: C.E.E. Project, also known as Edge	Antoni Muntadas	1992	Catherine de Zegher	Kanaal Art Foundation, Courtray; traveled to all European Community member states, 1991–1992; Witte de With Center for Contemporary Art, Rotterdam, Feb. 22–Dec. 31, 1992; Federacion Espagnola de Municipios y Provincios, Madrid, Apr 30–May 31, 1992; Fundaçao Serralves, Porto, Apr 30–Dec 31, 1992; Broadgate, London, May 13–June 15, 1992; Staatliche Hochschule für Bildende Künste, Frankfurt, Jan 12–Dec 21, 1992; Institut Français de Thessalonique, Thessalonique, Feb 10, 1997	
Ilya Kabakov & Ulo Sooster	Ilya Kabakov, Ulo Sooster	Oct 10–Dec 20, 1992	Catherine de Zegher Elizabeth Ann Macgregor	Kanaal Art Foundation, Courtray; traveled to Ikon Gallery, Birmingham, Apr 14–May 15, 1993; Centre for Contemporary Arts, Glasgow, July–Aug. 1993; Museum of Israeli Art, Ramat Gan, Sept 2–Oct 31, 1993; Vancouver Art Gallery, Vancouver, Apr 13–May 30, 1994	
Everlyn Nicodemus: Vessels of Silence	Everlyn Nicodemus	Oct 30–Nov 22, 1992	Catherine de Zegher	Kanaal Art Foundation at Cultureel Centrum Kortrijk, Courtray	
Gabriel Orozco: In Broel-and Brewerytower	Gabriel Orozco	Apr 24–June 26, 1993	Catherine de Zegher	Kanaal Art Foundation at Broel-towers and Brewery-tower, Courtray	
Andrea Robbins and Max Becher: Cultural Remains: ‘Cultural Remains: Wall Street in Cuba’ – ‘ Holland, Michigan’	Andrea Robbins and Max Becher	Dec 10, 1994–Jan 15, 1995	Catherine de Zegher	Organized by Kanaal Art Foundation, Courtray. In co-production with: The Vleeshal, Middleburg, Holland, Oct 21 1994–Nov 27, 1995. Location: State Archives, Courtray, Dec 1994–Jan 1995	

=== Group exhibition ===
Title	Artists	Year	Curator(s)	Institution / Location	Ref
Inside the Visible. Begin the Beguine in Flanders: Cultural Ambassador of Flanders, an exhibition gradually unfolding over the period of a year, representing the work of international contemporary artists.	Bracha L. Ettinger, Mona Hatoum, Ann Veronica Janssens, Anna Maria Maiolino, Avis Newman, Martha Rosler, Nancy Spero, Jana Sterbak, Joelle Tuerlinckx, Cecilia Vicuna	1994-1995	Catherine de Zegher	Kanaal Art Foundation, Begijnhof St-Elisabeth, Courtray	

== 1992: America, Bride of the Sun ==
Title	Artists	Year	Curator(s)	Institution / Location	Ref
America, Bride of the Sun. 500 Years / Latin America and the Low Countries	Including, among others, Alicia Barney, Juan Davila, Lydia Clark, Waltercio Caldas, Luis Camnitzer, Carlos Capelan, Jimmie Durham, Roberto Evangelista, Lucio Fontana, Mathias Goeritz, Frida Kahlo, David Lamelas, Lea Lublin, Ana Mendieta, Oscar Munoz, Helio Oiticica, Regina Vater, Victor Grippo	Jan, 1990–May 31, 1992	Catherine de Zegher Paul Vandenbroeck	Royal Museum of Fine Arts, Antwerp	

== 1995: Inside the Visible: An Elliptical Traverse of 20th Century Art, In, Of, and From the Feminine ==
Title	Artists	Year	Curator(s)	Institution / Location	Ref
Inside the Visible: An Elliptical Traverse of 20th Century Art, In, Of, and From the Feminine: Awarded "Best Show," AICA Award, 1995–1996	Including, among others, Hannah Höch, Claude Cahun, Louise Bourgeois, Carol Rama, Yayoi Kusama, Martha Rosler, Ana Mendieta, Carrie Mae Weems, Nadine Taseel, Jana Sterbak, Ana Torf, Charlotte Salomon, Mira Schendel, Nancy Spero, Hanne Darboven, Susan Hiller, Lili Dujourie, Avis Newman Inside the Visible was based on the exhibition series entitled Begin de Begijne in Vlaanderen, organized by Kanaal Art Foundation at the Begijnhof St-Elisabeth, Courtray. The exhibition consisted of assembling all individual contemporary art exhibitions from the series in one group exhibition including historical work of 37 women artists from the 20th century.	Jan 31, 1996–May 15, 1996	Catherine de Zegher	Institute of Contemporary Art, Boston, traveled to National Museum of Women in the Arts, Washington, June 15–Sept 15, 1996; Whitechapel Art Gallery, London, Nov 10–Dec 8, 1996; Art Gallery of Western Australia, Perth, Feb 13–April 6, 1997	

== 1997: Mona Hatoum, Ann Veronica Janssens, Gabriel Orozco ==
Title	Artists	Year	Curator(s)	Institution / Location	Ref
Mona Hatoum, Ann Veronica Janssens, Gabriel Orozco	Mona Hatoum, Ann Veronica Janssens, Gabriel Orozco	Sept 12–Oct 18, 1997	Catherine de Zegher	Galerie Micheline Szwajcer, Antwerp	

== 1997: 47th Venice Biennale, Belgian Pavilion ==
Title	Artists	Year	Curator(s)	Institution / Location	Ref
47th Venice Biennale, Thierry de Cordier: Kamer der gedachten (Scriptorium)	Thierry de Cordier	June 15–Nov 9, 1997	Catherine de Zegher	Venice Biennale, Belgian Pavilion, Venice	

== 1998: Martha Rosler: Positions in the Life World ==
Title	Artists	Year	Curator(s)	Institution / Location	Ref
Martha Rosler: Positions in the Life World	Martha Rosler	Dec 5, 1998–Jan 30, 1999	Catherine de Zegher Elizabeth Ann Macgregor	Ikon Gallery, Birmingham; traveled to Nouveau Musée de Art Contemporani, Barcelona; The Generali Foundation, Vienna; New Museum, New York	

== 1999–2006: Drawing Center, New York ==
=== Solo exhibitions ===
Title	Artists	Year	Curator(s)	Institution / Location	Ref
Cyrilla Mozenter: Very Well Saint	Cyrilla Mozenter	May 12–June 10, 2000	Catherine de Zegher	Drawing Center, New York	
Mark Manders: Room with Several Night Drawings and One Reduced Night Scene	Mark Manders	June 21– July 26, 2000	Catherine de Zegher	Drawing Center, New York	
Ania Soliman: Biohazards	Ania Soliman	Sep 9–Oct 7, 2000	Catherine de Zegher	Drawing Center, New York	
Untitled Passages by Henri Michaux	Henri Michaux	Oct 28–Dec 20, 2000	Catherine de Zegher	Drawing Center, New York	
Draw & Tell: Lines of Transformation by Norval Morrisseau/Copper Thunderbird	Norval Morrisseau, Copper Thunderbird	Feb 24–April 7, 2001	Catherine de Zegher	Drawing Center, New York	
Between Street and Mirror: The Drawings of James Ensor	James Ensor	April 27–July 7, 2001	Catherine de Zegher, Robert Hoozee	Drawing Center, New York	
Bracha Lichtenberg Ettinger: Eurydice		Nov 31–Dec 15, 2001	Catherine de Zegher	Drawing Center, New York	
Suzan Frecon: Drawing Painting	Suzan Frecon	Jan 4–Feb 15, 2002	Catherine de Zegher	Drawing Center, New York	
Anna Maria Maiolino: A Life Line/Vida Afora	Anna Maria Maiolino	Jan 10–Feb 21, 2002	Catherine de Zegher	Drawing Center, New York	
Suzan Frecon: Drawing painting	Suzan Frecon	Jan 10–Feb 21, 2002	Catherine de Zegher	Drawing Center, New York	
Ellen Gallagher: Preserve	Ellen Gallagher	March 2– April 20, 2002	Jeff Fleming, Catherine de Zegher	Drawing Center, New York; Des Moines Art Center	
Clarina Bezzola: Fluid	Clarine Bezzola	June 19–July 27, 2002	Catherine de Zegher	Drawing Center, New York	
Ellsworth Kelly: Tablet 1949–1973	Ellsworth Kelly	May 2–July 24, 2002	Yve-Alain Bois, Catherine de Zegher	Drawing Center, New York; traveled to Musee Cantonal des Beaux Arts, Lausanne	
Sarah Oppenheimer: Hallway	Sarah Oppenheimer	May 3–June 8, 2002	Catherine de Zegher	Drawing Center, New York	
Kay Rosen: Collages 1999-2002	Kay Rosen	Sep 22–Oct 26, 2002	Catherine de Zegher	Drawing Center, New York	
Cesar Paternosto and Cecilia Vicuña, DIS SOLVING: threads of water and light	Cesar Paternosto, Cecilia Vicuña	Nov 2–Dec 20, 2002	Catherine de Zegher	Drawing Center, New York	
Róza El-Hassan: Drawings	Róza El-Hassan	June 6–July 26, 2003	Catherine de Zegher	Drawing Center, New York	
Giuseppe Penone: The Imprint of Drawing	Giuseppe Penone	January 22–March 4, 2004	Catherine de Zegher	Drawing Center, New York; traveled to Milton Keynes Gallery, 27 Mar–9 May 2004	
Zoe Keramea: Geometry of Paradox		June 18-July 30, 2005	Catherine de Zegher	Drawing Center, New York	
Richard Tuttle: It's a Room for 3 People	Richard Tuttle	Nov 6, 2004–March 5, 2005	Catherine de Zegher	Drawing Center, New York; traveled to The Aspen Art Museum, Aspen, Colorado	
Looking at the Spirits: Peter Minshall's Carnival Drawings		Sep 17–29 Oct 29 2005	Catherine de Zegher, Luis Camnitzer	Drawing Center, New York	
Joelle Tuerlinckx's Drawing Inventory	Joelle Tuerlinckx	Febr 25–Apr 22, 2006	Catherine de Zegher	Drawing Center, New York	
Crust and Dirt's Instant Drawing Machine	Oliver Halsman Rosenberg, Clint Taniguchi	June 17–July 22, 2006		Drawing Center, New York	
Eva Hesse Drawings: Award for Excellence, AAMC The Association of Art Museum Curators	Eva Hesse	May 6–July 15, 2006	Catherine de Zegher Elizabeth Sussman	Drawing Center, New York; traveled to The Menil Collection, Houston, Feb 3-Apr 23, 2006; Los Angeles Museum of Contemporary Art, Los Angeles, Aug 6-Oct 28, 2006; Walker Art Center, Minneapolis, Nov 12, 2006-Feb 18, 2007)	

=== Group exhibitions ===
Title	Artists	Year	Curator(s)	Institution / Location	Ref
Another City for Another Life: Constant's New Babylon		Nov 2– Dec 30, 1999	Mark Wigley, Catherine de Zegher	Drawing Center, New York; traveled to Witte de With in Rotterdam, 1998	
The Body of the Line: Eisenstein's Drawings		Jan 22– March 18, 2000	Jean Gagnon, Catherine de Zegher	Drawing Center, New York	
Korwa Drawings: Contemporary Tribal Works on Paper from Central India		Oct 11–Nov 9, 2000	Catherine de Zegher	Drawing Center, New York	
The Prinzhorn Collection: Traces Upon the Wunderblock: Best Show AICA Award, 2000–2001		April 15–June 10, 2000	Catherine de Zegher	Drawing Center, New York	
Performance Drawings	Milan Grygar, Alison Knowles, Erwin Wurm, Christopher Taggart, Elena Del Rio	April 19–July 28, 2001	Catherine de Zegher	Drawing Center, New York	
The stage of Drawing: Gesture and Act. Selected from the Tate Collection	Including, among others, Joshua Reynolds, William Blake, Edgar Degas, Pierre Bonnard, William Turner, Aubrey Beardsley, Francis Bacon, Kurt Schwitters, Eileen Agar, Barbara Hepworth, Richard Hamilton, Eva Hesse, Andy Warhol, George Dance, Henry Fuseli, Juan Gris, John Hamilton Mortimer, Marcel Duchamp, Natalya Goncharova, William Henry Hunt, El Lissitzky, William Young Ottley, Francis Picabia	April 5–May 31, 2003	Aves Newman (selection) Catherine de Zegher	Drawing Center, New York; travelled to Museum of Contemporary Art, Sydney, June 18–Aug 23, 2003; Tate Liverpool, Liverpool, Sept 26, 2003–March 28, 2004; Tate Britain, London	
Ocean Flowers: Impressions from Nature		March 25–May 22, 2004	Catherine de Zegher Carol Armstrong	Drawing Center, New York, traveled to Yale Center for British Art, New Haven, Dec 6–Aug 8, 2004	
Field of Color: Tantra Drawings from India		Nov 6, 2004-Jan 12, 2005	Franck André Jamme (co-curator Catherine de Zegher)	Drawing Center, New York	
3 x Abstraction: New Methods of Drawing by Hilma af Klint, Emma Kunz, and Agnes Martin: Best Show AICA Award 2005	Hilma af Klint, Emma Kunz, Agnes Martin	19 March - 21 May 2005	Catherine de Zegher Hendel Teicher	Drawing Center, New York; travelled to Santa Monica Museum of Art, Santa Monica, June 10–-Aug 13, 2005; Kilmainham Museum, Dublin	
Persistent Vestiges: Drawings from the American Vietnam War	Including, among others, Nancy Spero, Vu Giang Huong, Martha Rosler, Binh Danh	Nov 5, 2005–Feb 11, 2006	Catherine de Zegher	Drawing Center, New York	

== 2007–2009: Art Gallery of Ontario, Toronto ==
Title	Artists	Year	Curator(s)	Institution / Location	Ref
Reinstallation European Galleries	Including two-part film installation by Kara Walker in Laidlow Gallery, and a large carved-wood installation by Giuseppe Penone in Galleria Italia	2009	Catherine de Zegher	Art Gallery of Ontario, Toronto	

== 2006: Freeing the Line ==
Title	Artists	Year	Curator(s)	Institution / Location	Ref
Freeing the Line	Gego, Monika Grzymala, Eva Hesse, Karel MalichJulie Mehretu, Ranjani Shettar, Joelle Tuerlinckx, Richard Tuttle	June 22 - Aug 26, 2006	Catherine de Zegher	Marian Goodman Gallery, New York	

== 2010: Alma Matrix: Shared Traces/Trazos ==
Title	Artists	Year	Curator(s)	Institution / Location	Ref
Alma Matrix: Shared Traces/Trazos en Comun Bracha Ettinger and Ria Verhaeghe (juxtaposed with Eva Hesse: Studioworks)	Bracha L. Ettinger, Ria Verhaeghe, Eva Hesse	May–Aug 2010	Catherine de Zegher	Fundacion Antoni Tapies Foundation, Barcelona	

== 2011: On Line: Drawing Through the Twentieth Century ==
Title	Artists	Year	Curator(s)	Institution / Location	Ref
On Line: Drawing through the Twentieth Century * Awarded Best Thematic Museum Show In New York, AICA-USA	Including, among others, Anni Albers, Francis Alÿs, Giovanni Anselmo, Jean (Hans) Arp, A. Balasubramaniam, Stanley Brouwn, Trisha Brown, Alexander Calder, Luis Camnitzer, Nina Canell, Lygia Clark, Edith Dekyndt, Marcel Duchamp, William Forsythe, Ellen Gallagher, Mona Hatoum, Susan Hefuna, Eva Hesse, Julie Mehretu, Cildo Meireles, Bruce Nauman, Yvonne Rainer, Xavier Le Roy, Fred Sandback, Carolee Schneemann, Michael Snow, Sophie Taeuber-Arp, Joëlle Tuerlinckx, Richard Tuttle, Cy Twombly, Cecilia Vicuña, Maria Helena Vieira da Silva	Nov 21, 2010–Feb 7, 2011	Cornelia Butler Catherine de Zegher	Museum of Modern Art, New York.	

== 2012: 18th Biennale of Sydney ==
Title	Artists	Year	Curator(s)	Institution / Location	Ref
18th Biennale of Sydney, All our Relations	Including, among others, Jananne Al-Ani, El Anatsui, Alwar Balasubramaniam, Subhankar Banerjee, Nina Canell, Maria Fernanda Cardoso, Adam Cvijanovic, Binh Danh, Anne Teresa De Keersmaeker, Latifa Echakhch, Juan Manuel Echavarría, Alec Finlay, Carlos Garaicoa, Iris Häussler, Susan Hefuna, Nicholas Hlobo, Cristina Iglesias, Ann Veronica Janssens, Yun-Fei Ji, Jin Nü, Bouchra Khalili, Eva Kot’átková, Cal Lane, Farideh Lashai, Lee Mingwei, Li Hongbo, Nadia Myre, Fujiko Nakaya, Makinti Napanangka, Dorothy Napangardi Ewa Partum, Ed Pien with Tanya Tagaq, Imran Qureshi, Robin Rhode, Craigie Horsfield, Daan Roosegaarde, Pinaree Sanpitak, Hassan Sharif, Tiffany Singh, Sriwhana Spong, Yuken Teruya, Alick Tipoti, Cecilia Vicuña, Judy Watson, Judith Wright, Nyapanyapa Yunupingu	June 27–Sep 16, 2012	Catherine de Zegher Gerald McMaster	Biennale of Sydney, Sydney	

== 2013: 55th Venice Biennale ==
Title	Artists	Year	Curator(s)	Institution / Location	Ref
55th Venice Biennale, Australian Pavilion, Giardini, Simryn Gill. Here Art Grows on Trees	Simryn Gill	1 June–24 Nov, 2013	Catherine de Zegher	Venice Bienniale, Venice	

== 2013: 5th Moscow Biennale ==
Title	Artists	Year	Curator(s)	Institution / Location	Ref
5th Moscow Biennale, Bolshe Seta / More Light	Including, among others, Eija-Liisa Ahtila, Umida Akhmedova, Vyacheslav Akhunov, Viktor Alimpiev, Shuvinai Ashoona, Geta Bratescu, Alexander Brodsky, Lorraine Connelly-Northey, Adam Cvijanovic, Edith Dekyndt, Rena Effendi, Parastou Forouhar, Yona Friedman, Simryn Gill, Ulrike Grossarth, Mona Hatoum, Jumaadi, Amar Kanwar, Aisha Khalid, Bouchra Khalili, Eva Kotatkova, Nicolas Kozakis and Raoul Vaneigem, Farideh Lashai, Mark Licari, Erin Manning, Julie Mehretu, Wangechi Mutu, Avis Newman, Selma and Sofiane Ouissi, Panamarenko, Sopheap Pich, Ed Pien, Robin Rhode, Ranjani Shettar, Song Dong, Frances Stark, Samuil Stoyanov, Tavares Strachan, Alia Syed, Dmitry Venkov, Adrian Villar Rojas, Gosia Wlodarczak, Yin Xiuzhen, Yang Yongliang	Sept 20–Oct 20, 2013	Catherine de Zegher	Moscow Biennale, Moscow	

== 2013–2018: Museum of Fine Arts, Ghent ==
=== Solo exhibitions ===
Title	Artists	Dates	Curator(s)	Institution / Location	Ref
Isabel & Alfredo Aquilizan, Lade (Project: Another Country)	Isabel and Alfredo Aquilizan	2013	Catherine de Zegher	Museum of Fine Arts, Ghent	
Géricault, Fragments of Compassion	Géricault	Feb 22–May 25, 2014	Bruno Fornari Catherine de Zegher	Museum of Fine Arts, Ghent; organized in association with Schirn Kunsthalle, Frankfurt	
Julia Margaret Cameron: 1815–2015	Julia Margaret Cameron	March 14–June 14, 2015	Catherine de Zegher Johan De Smet	Museum of Fine Arts, Ghent; organized in association with Victoria and Albert Museum, London	
Manufactories of Caring Space-time Gorod Ustinov: Micromuseum Gent	Gorod Ustinov	May 5–Sept 30, 2015	Catherine de Zegher, Beatrice Josse, Laurence Rassel (assisted by Blanca Callén, Soledad Gutiérrez)	Museum of Fine Arts, Ghent; as part of Manufactories of Caring Space-Time, organized in association with 49 Nord 6 Est, FRAC Lorraine, Metz, and Fundació Antoni Tàpies, Barcelona	
Lili Dujourie, Maagdendale, 1982	Lili Dujourie	June 6–Oct 4, 2015	Catherine de Zegher	Museum of Fine Arts, Ghent	
Mona Hatoum, Close Quarters	Mona Hatoum	Nov 8, 2014–Feb 22, 2015	Catherine de Zegher	Museum of Fine Arts, Ghent	
Simryn Gill: The (Hemi)Cycle of Leaves and Paper	Simryn Gill	Apr 22–Sep 4, 2016	Catherine de Zegher	Museum of Fine Arts, Ghent	
Manufactories of Caring Space-time The Minor Gesture	Selma and Sofiane Ouissi	June 18–Aug 15, 2016	Catherine de Zegher, Beatrice Josse, Laurence Rassel (assisted by Blanca Callén, Soledad Gutiérrez)	Museum of Fine Arts, Ghent; as part of Manufactories of Caring Space-Time, organized in association with 49 Nord 6 Est, FRAC Lorraine, Metz, and Fundació Antoni Tàpies, Barcelona	
Donas. The Belgian Avantgardi	Donas	March 5–June 5, 2016	Peter Pauwels, Catherine de Zegher, Johan De Smet	Museum of Fine Arts, Ghent	
Metafloristics, Dreaming of Imaginary Nature	Gerda Steiner, Jörg Lenzlinger	Apr 22, 2016–Dec 31, 2018	Catherine de Zegher	Museum of Fine Arts, Ghent	
Verhaeren Revealed: The Writer, Critic and the Art of his Time (1881-1916)	Verhaeren Revealed:	Oct 15, 2016–Jan 15, 2017	Bruno Fornari, Johan De Smet, Cathérine Verleysen, Catherine de Zegher	Museum of Fine Arts, Ghent	
EyeWitness: Francisco Goya and Farideh Lashai	Francisco Goya, Farideh Lashai	Feb 11–May 7, 2017	Catherine de Zegher Johan De Smet	Museum of Fine Arts, Ghent; in collaboration with Prado Museum, Madrid, and British Museum, London	
Medardo Rosso: Pioneer of modern sculpture		March 17–June 24, 2018	Gloria Moure, Catherine de Zegher, Johan De Smet	Museum of Fine Arts, Ghent	
Geta Brătescu: An Atelier of One's Own	Geta Brătescu	Sep 16, 2017–Jan 14, 2018	Catherine de Zegher	Museum of Fine Arts, Ghent; organized in association with by Camden Arts Centre, London	
Parastou Forouhar: Written Room	Parastou Forouhar	Feb 11, 2017–Dec 31, 2019	Catherine de Zegher	Museum of Fine Arts, Ghent	
Van Eyck. An Optical Revolution	Jan Van Eyck	Feb 1–April 30, 2020	Initiated by Catherine de Zegher Maximiliaan Martens	Museum of Fine Arts, Ghent	

=== Group exhibitions ===
Title	Artists	Dates	Curator(s)	Institution / Location	Ref
Solstice, A Tribute to Robert Hoozee	Including, among others, François-Joseph Navez, Alfred Stevens, James Ensor, Fernand Khnopff, George Minne, Oskar Kokoschka, Erich Heckel, Georges Vantongerloo, Odilon Redon, Félicien Rops, Léon Spilliaert	June 21–Oct 12, 2014	Catherine de Zegher Johan De Smet	Museum of Fine Arts, Ghent	
On the Move		July 1–Oct 10, 2015	Catherine de Zegher	Museum of Fine Arts, Ghent	
Love Letters in War and Peace	Including, among others, Guillaume Apollinaire, Arthur Rimbaud, Camille Claudel, Hannah Höch, F.T. Marinetti, Pablo Picasso, Mona Hatoum, Oscar Wilde, Dante Gabriel Rossetti, Dora Carrington, Stanley Spencer, Hans Arp, Sophie Taeuber-Arp, Max Beckmann, Marc Chagall, Hannah Höch, Max Klinger, László Moholy-Nagy, Alfred Stieglitz, Charley Toorop, Félix Vallotton	Nov 8, 2014–Feb 22, 2015	Catherine de Zegher Johan De Smet	Museum of Fine Arts, Ghent	
The Golden Age Revisited, A Curious Collection from the Netherlands	Including, among others, Frans Hals, Jan van Goyen, Willem Claesz. Heda, Albert Cuyp, Roelant Savery, Isabelle de Borchgrave	Oct 10, 2015–Feb 28, 2016	Catherine de Zegher, Johan De Smet, Jos De Meyere, Bruno Fornari	Museum of Fine Arts, Ghent	
Lines Of Tangency	Edith Dekyndt, Aslan Gaisumov, Monika Grzymala, Tim Knowles, Maria Laet, Pieter Vermeersch, Gosia Wlodarczak, John Wolseley, Sarah Sze	Oct 10, 2015–March 5, 2016	Catherine de Zegher	Museum of Fine Arts, Ghent	
Manufactories of Caring Space-time Objections		Feb 18–May 18, 2017	Catherine de Zegher, Beatrice Josse, Laurence Rassel (assisted by Blanca Callén, Soledad Gutiérrez)	Museum of Fine Arts, Ghent; as part of Manufactories of Caring Space-Time, organized in association with 49 Nord 6 Est, FRAC Lorraine, Metz, and Fundació Antoni Tàpies, Barcelona	
Metafloristics, Dreaming of Imaginary Nature	Gerda Steiner, Jörg Lenzlinger	Apr 22, 2016–Dec 31, 2018	Catherine de Zegher	Museum of Fine Arts, Ghent	
From Bosch to Tuymans, Permanent Collection Presentation		Oct 21, 2017–Dec 31, 2020	Catherine de Zegher, Catherine Verleysen, Johan De Smet, Bruno Fornari, Valentine De Beir	Museum of Fine Arts, Ghent	
