= Catherine de Zegher =

Belgian curator, art critic, and art historian

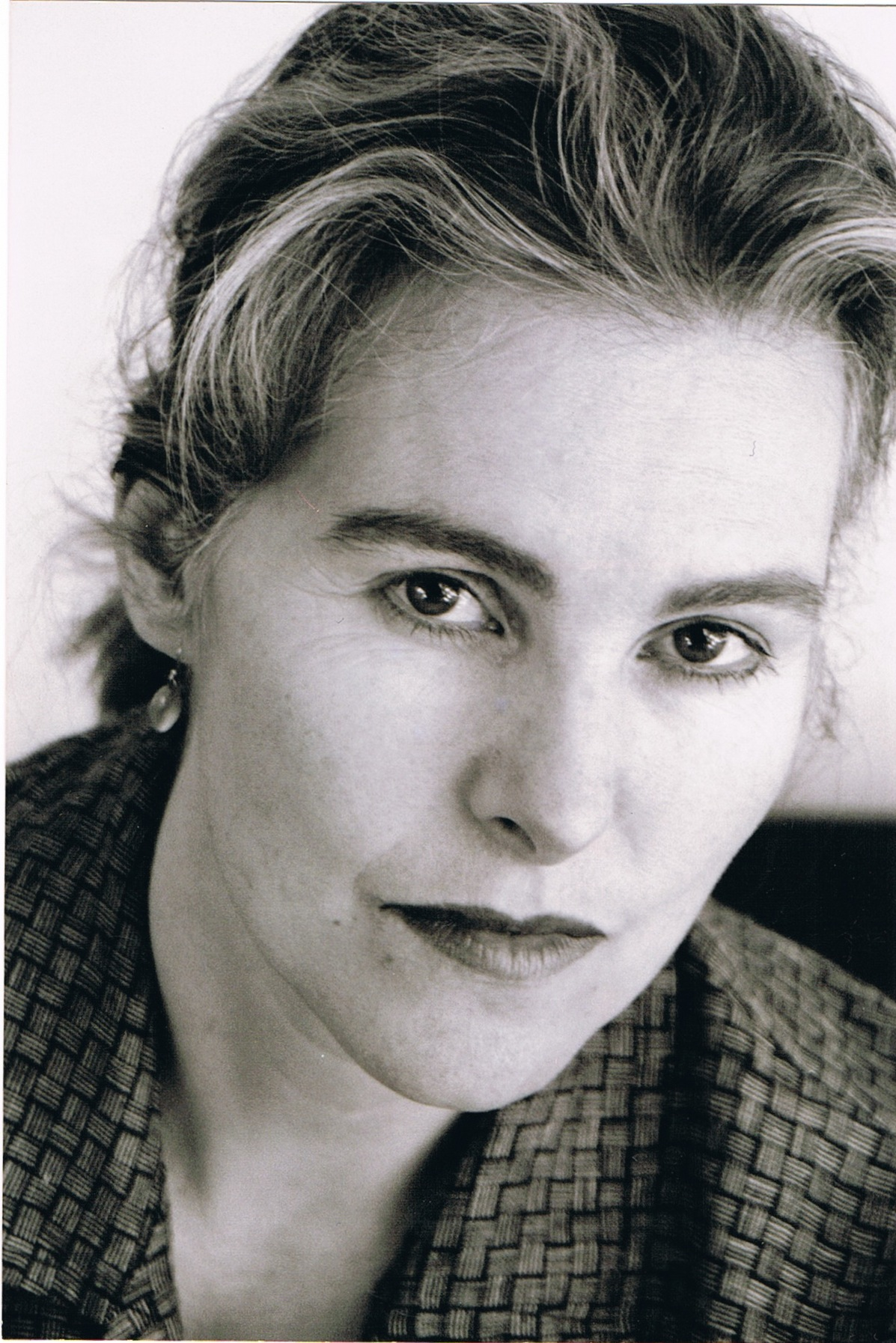
- Catherine de Zegher portrait
- Born: Marie-Catherine Alma Gladys de Zegher; 1955 (age 70–71); Groningen, Netherlands
- Education: University of Ghent
- Occupations: Curator and art historian

Catherine de Zegher (born Marie-Catherine Alma Gladys de Zegher Groningen, 14 April 1955) is a Belgian curator and a modern and contemporary art historian. She has a degree in art history and archaeology from the University of Ghent.

From 1988 to 1998, de Zegher was director of the Kunststichting Kanaal, Kortrijk, from 1999 to 2006, executive director and chief curator of the Drawing Center, New York, from 2007 to 2009, director of exhibitions and publications of the Art Gallery of Ontario, Toronto, and from 2013 to 2018, director of the Museum of Fine Arts, Ghent. In 2018, she was temporarily suspended from this post as a result of the Toporovski Collection controversy. She was permanently suspended in 2019 and in 2020, she retired.

De Zegher was curator of the Belgian pavilion (1997) and the Australian pavilion (2013), both at the Venice Biennale, as well as the Moscow Biennale (2013). She was co-artistic director with Gerald McMaster of the Biennale of Sydney (2012). Her curatorial projects have included, On Line. Drawing through the Twentieth Century, Museum of Modern Art (MoMA), New York (2010), and Inside the Visible. An Elliptical Traverse of 20th Century Art in, of, and From the Feminine, Institute of Contemporary Art, Boston (1966); traveled to Whitechapel Gallery, London (1996); Art Gallery of Western Australia, Perth (1997).

Having curated more than eighty museum exhibitions and large-scale perennial exhibitions, her exhibitions challenge mainstream models of art and art history and often promote the feminine principle.

For her contribution to curating, de Zegher received the 2010–11 best show awards from AICA (Award of International Critics) and, in 2017, the OSCARla-award for her role in the art world. Since 2014, De Zegher is a member of the Royal Flemish Academy of Belgium for Science and the Arts.

== Career ==
=== Kanaal Art Foundation, Kortrijk (1988–98) ===
De Zegher began her work as an exhibition curator in 1988, when she co-founded (together with Stefaan De Clerck, founding president) the Kanaal Art Foundation in Kortrijk. She directed the institution until 1998 and focused on emerging international artists, multiculturalism, and feminist aesthetics, for example, the long-term exhibition project Inside the Visible. Begin the Beguine in Flanders. At first the foundation was located in a textile factory; from 1988, it began organizing exhibitions across Kortrijk, including the historic buildings of the Beguinage. The first exhibitions were by Belgian artist Lili Dujourie (1988–89) and Brazilian artists Cildo Meireles & Tunga (1989). Following shows included, among others, Patrick Corillon (1989), Tadashi Kawamata (1990), Guy Rombouts & Monica Droste (1990), Robin Winters (1990), James Casebere & Tony Oursler (1991–92), Waltercio Caldas (1991), David Lamelas (1992), Antoni Muntadas (1992), Ilya Kabakov & Ulo Sooster (1992), Everlyn Nicodemus (1992), Gabriel Orozco (1993), Nancy Spero & Bracha L. Ettinger (1994), and Andrea Robbins and Max Becher (1995).

=== Drawing Center, New York (1999–06) ===
From 1999 to 2006, de Zegher served as executive director, chief curator, and editor at The Drawing Center, New York. Under her seven-year leadership, the center presented more than sixty historical and contemporary shows, expanded its archive and lecture program, and created a viewing program that invited artists to drawing-based public art projects and performances. From 2003 to 2005, she led negotiations to move The Drawing Center, based in SoHo, to Ground Zero as part of the plans to share a building with a proposed International Freedom Center. The project was part of the memorial for the victims, and a museum intended to draw attention to battles for freedom throughout history planned in the immediate aftermath of the attacks and destruction of the World Trade Center. After a power struggle set off by the move to Ground Zero, de Zegher resigned in March 2006. De Zegher's curatorial projects at The Drawing Center include Eva Hesse Drawing jointly curated with Elisabeth Sussman and Joelle Tuerlinckx's Drawing Inventory both in 2006; Persistent Vestiges: Drawing from the American Vietnam War, and 3 x Abstraction: New Methods of Drawing by Hilma af Klint, Emma Kunz, and Agnes Martin, Richard Tuttle: It's a Room for 3 People in 2005; Ocean Flowers: Impressions from Nature with Carol Armstrong (2003–2004); Giuseppe Penone: The Imprint of Drawing (2004); The Stage of Drawing: Gesture and Act. Selected from the Tate Collection (2003); Anna Maria Maiolino: A Life Line/Vida Afora (2002); Bracha Lichtenberg Ettinger: Eurydice Series, and Between Street and Mirror: The Drawings of James Ensor both in 2001; Untitled Passages by Henri Michaux co-curated with Florian Rodari and The Prinzhorn Collection: Traces Upon the Wunderblock in collaboration with Inge Jadi and Laurent Busine both in 2000.

=== Art Gallery of Ontario, Toronto (2007–09) ===
De Zegher served as director of exhibitions and publications at the Art Gallery of Ontario, Toronto (2007–09). She joined the museum to oversee the (re)installation of the museum galleries and created an exhibitions program for the Frank Gehry-designed renovated building.

=== Museum of Fine Arts, Ghent (2013–18) ===
From 2013 to 2018, de Zegher served as director of the Museum voor Schone Kunsten (MSK), Ghent. Her appointment came after uncertainty following the museum's long-term director's death and restoration of the building. Her task included the MSK transformation as a city service into a division of the Autonoom Gemeentebedrijf Kunsten. The exhibitions and program she developed for the museum attached importance to juxtaposing historical and contemporary art. For example, she connected the historical exhibition Gericault: Fragments of Compassion (2014) to the work of Filipino and Australian artist duo Isabel & Alfredo Aquilizan, who installed cardboard boats reminiscent of the raft in Gericault's historic paintingThe Raft of the Medusa, evoking associations with migration and refugees. De Zegher's said that her program, 'aimed to break down separations in society, of isolated and overlooked women, of marginalized communities, and the separation between historical and contemporary art.'

De Zegher's curatorial projects at the MSK include The Ladies of the Barok (2018); Geta Bratescu: A Studio of One's Own, Parastou Forouhar, Written Room, EyeWitness: Francisco Goya & Farideh Lashai; Simryn Gill, The hemi(cycle) of leaves and paper (2016); Gerda Steiner & Jorg Lenzlinger, Metafloristiek, Raaklijnen/Tangents/Tangentes, Eija-Liisa Ahtila, On foreign subjects, nature of miracles and possibilities of perception, Julia Margaret Cameron in 2015; and Love Letters in War and Peace/Mona Hatoum: Close Quarters, Katrien Vermeire, Kreislauf, Isabel & Alfredo Aquilizan, Lade (Project: Another Country) in 2014.

From 2015 to 2017, she curated a series of projects at MSK organized in the framework of the European Commission's Creative Europe project, entitled Manufactories of Caring Space-time, organized in conjunction with 49 Nord 6 Est – FRAC Lorraine, Metz, and Fundació Antoni Tàpies, Barcelona. The project included artists from Europe's margins (Russia and Tunisia) who reflected on the relational, the collective, and collaborative. It showed, among others, the work of Gorod Ustinov, Erin Manning, and Selma & Sofiane Ouissi.

Under her directorship, de museum (re)installed its collection which opened to the public with the exhibition From Bosch to Tuymans, A Vivid Narrative (2017). It includes some juxtapositions of old and contemporary works by artists, such as, Luc Tuymans, Ria Verhaeghe, and Patrick Van Caeckenbergh, to integrate a more in-depth reading of the artworks.

=== Toporovski Collection Controversy ===
In 2017, more than 20 pieces of Russian avant-garde from the Dieleghem Foundation (Toporovski collection, owned by Igor Toporovski) made a nucleus of the exhibition From Bosch to Tuymans, A Vivid Narrative (2017) at the Museum voor Schone Kunsten (MSK). In 2018, however, the Toporovski collection was claimed to be doubtful concerning their authenticity by a group of art dealers and some scholars in The Art Newspaper and De Standaard. Due to the problems surrounding the collection, the museum board ordered an audit on the event and de Zegher was suspended pending this process. De Zegher disputes any wrongdoing. However, she lied about two expert having researched the collection. Both experts mentioned by de Zegher denied investigating the artworks. She and the City of Ghent closed the exhibition a month into the controversy and terminated the contract with the owner so that the works could be returned. Currently the matter is in the hands of an investigating judge. On 22 February 2019, de Zegher was suspended indefinitely as director, based on the audit findings that had started in 2018. She remained an employee of the Department of Culture. The city also announced that de Zegher remains subject to ongoing disciplinary proceedings, pending a possible definite dismissal. She retired in 2020.

== Selected curatorial projects ==
=== America, Bride of the Sun (1990–92) ===
In 1990–92, de Zegher, together with art historian Paul Vandenbroeck, curated America, Bride of the Sun. 500 Years/Latin America and the Low Countries, Royal Museum of Fine Arts, Antwerp. This large-scale exhibition focused on Flemish art's influence during the Conquista of Latin America (1492). The show featured artworks by living artists, including 23 South American artists, who critically assessed colonization and its social and environmental impact in a post-colonial era. In a written interview with Benjamin H.D. Buchloh, de Zegher noted that, 'the exhibition contributed to the opening of the mainstream of contemporary art far beyond Europe and the US, to the intimate and particularities of lives lived in places that for long had been made invisible and overlooked.'

=== Inside the Visible (1996–97) ===
In response to increasing cultural racism and conservatism in the 1990s, de Zegher curated the traveling exhibition Inside the Visible. An Elliptical Traverse of 20th-Century Art in, of, and from the Feminine (1996–97), an exhibition that foregrounded women's art practices that separate themselves from the rise of repressive totalitarian systems—in pre-war Europe during the 1930s and 1940s, and following the May 68 cultural revolutions. The exhibition was on view at ICA Institute of Contemporary Art, Boston, and traveled to the National Museum of Women in the Arts, Washington, DC; Whitechapel Gallery, London; Art Gallery of Western Australia, Perth. For the exhibition, the Zegher received the Best Show AICA Award. The exhibition was accompanied by a book (MIT Press).

=== Freeing the Line (2006) ===
De Zegher's exhibition Freeing the Line: Gego, Monika Grzymala, Eva Hesse, Karel Malich, Julie Mehretu, Ranjani Shettar, Joelle Tuerlinckx, Richard Tuttle, Marian Goodman Gallery, NY (2006) brought together drawings by artists across generations and cultures. In a review, Holland Cotter wrote in The New York Times that there was "almost nothing to see when one entered the space." However, the "subtle marks of the drawings translate into conceptions of drawing that taken together is nothing less than groundbreaking in both method and implication."

=== Alma Matrix: Shared Traces/Trazos (2010) ===
The exhibition Alma Matrix: Shared Traces/Trazos en Comun. Bracha Ettinger and Ria Verhaeghe, Fundacion Antoni Tàpies Foundation, Barcelona (2010) juxtaposed works by Bracha L. Ettinger with works by Eva Hesse and Ria Verhaeghe. Though emerging from different social and cultural backgrounds, the exhibition demonstrated that these artists' art practices showed striking and significant aesthetic and ethical convergences. These artists' work displayed a shared sense of compassion for the 'Other', reflected in the attention to discarded pictures of unnamed people in newspapers and archival documents. They all share recovery processes and methods of compiling and marking and erasing in their drawings and paintings. Central to the exhibition were the notebooks that each artist has filled over many years, and more importantly, the matrix's use as a model of confluence and trans-subjectivity.

=== On Line: Drawing Through the Twentieth Century (2010–11) ===
In 2010–11, de Zegher curated, jointly with Connie Butler, On Line. Drawing Through the Twentieth Century, Museum of Modern Art, New York. The exhibition explored the radical transformation of drawing that began over a century ago and is a vital impulse in art today. Through works by over 100 artists, the exhibition presented a history of drawing that departed from traditional drawing ideas and reliance on paper as the medium's fundamental support. It stated that artists have pushed the drawing into real spaces and expanded drawing to painting, sculpture, photography, film, dance, and performance.

== Biennial projects ==
=== Venice Biennale, Belgian Pavilion (1997) ===
In 1997, Belgian artist Thierry De Cordier represented Belgium at the Venice Biennial. Catherine de Zegher curated the exhibition at the Belgian pavilion.

=== Biennale of Sydney (2012) ===
In 2012, de Zegher was a joint artistic director with Gerald McMaster of the 18th Biennale of Sydney, entitled All our relations. The exhibition championed connectivity, conversation, and compassion as models for being in the world. The project included 101 artists from 42 countries presented throughout several museum locations: Art Gallery of North South Wales; Museum of Contemporary Art Australia; Cockatoo Island; Pier 2/3 and Carriageworks. The exhibition's concept was to conceive of art as a way of activating a 'relational field' in which artists, things, and audiences could interact and create meaning together.

=== Venice Biennale, Australian Pavilion (2013) ===
In 2013, Australian artist Simryn Gill represented Australia at the 55th Venice Biennial. De Zegher curated the exhibition presenting the work of Gill entitled, Here art grows on trees. For the project the roof of the pavilion was removed so nature could take over and fuse with art.

=== Moscow Biennale (2013) ===
In 2013, de Zegher curated the 5th Moscow Biennale, entitled More Light/Bolshe Sveta at the Manege next to the Kremlin. The exhibition included a selection of projects from over 90 international artists. The exhibition was a critical reflection on different space-time structures, both in the context of economic overproduction, ecological disasters, and harmful technologies. At the same time, it considered light not only as necessary to the visual arts but also as a creative force generated between the viewer and the artwork. As is explained and illustrated in the book of the same title, the entire project suggests that this engagement and relation are required for the development of new thinking.

== Publications ==
Catherine de Zegher's most recent book is an anthology of collected essays on contemporary women artists written over 15 years: Women's Work Is Never Done.

- 2020: See All This Art Magazine No. 20 Pretty Brilliant Women in the Arts volume I
- 2022:See All This Art Magazine No. 28 Pretty Brilliant Women in the Arts volume II
- 2025: See All This Art Magazine No. 38 Pretty Brilliant Women in the Arts volume III

== Full list of curatorial projects ==
For a full list of de Zeghers exhibitions, see

== See also ==
- Biennale of Sydney
- Biennale of Moscow.
