= Avis Newman =

English painter and sculptor

Avis Newman (born 1946, London) is an English painter and sculptor.

Newman's drawings and large un-stretched canvases document her contemplative and intuitive investigation of the subconscious. Since the early 1980s she has been primarily associated with large-scale, minimalist drawings on un-stretched canvas - usually pinned directly to the gallery walls for display. Avis had her first solo exhibition at Matt's Gallery, London, in 1982.

Her work has been the subject of numerous national and international exhibitions including The Renaissance Society at the University of Chicago, 1988, Works, Casa Masaccio, Arezzo, Italy 1994; Saatchi Gallery, London 1994; Camden Arts Centre, London 1996; Lisson Gallery, London 1998; The National Gallery in Prague, 1999; Museum of Contemporary Art, Sydney 2003; National Museum of Art, Kaunas, Lithuania, 2004; IMMA Collection, Irish Museum of Modern Art, Dublin, Ireland Collage, London/New York’, Fred Gallery, London, UK, 2009; On Line: Drawing through the Twentieth Century at the Museum of Modern Art, New York, USA 2010; Drawing of the World, World of Drawing, Seoul National University, Seoul, South Korea 2010; The Moscow Biennale 5th Moscow Biennale of Contemporary Art, Moscow, Russia 2013; The Gallery at Norwich University of the Arts, Norwich, UK 2013; Mummery + Schnelle Gallery, London, UK 2014; Tate Modern, London, UK 2015; the Walker Art Gallery, Liverpool, UK 2017; A Very Special Place: Ikon in the 1990s, Birmingham, UK 2021; The Weight of Souls I, Maureen Paley: Studio M, London, UK; 2021

== Career ==
In 2003, she selected drawing works from the Tate Collection for the large-scale exhibition, ‘The Stage of Drawing: Gesture and Act’, curated by Catherine de Zegher for The Drawing Center, New York, USA and Tate. It was exhibited at The Drawing Center, New York, USA; The Museum of Contemporary Art, Sydney, Australia; Tate Liverpool and Tate Britain, UK. Her curatorial and editorial practice enabled a theoretical exploration of drawing practice linked to unconscious processes.

She was a visiting professor of Fine Art, Norwich University of the Arts, 2013–2015. Professor of Drawing at The Centre for Drawing, Research Centre at Wimbledon School of Art, UAL 2005-2010 developing a Phd Drawing Research Group and was editor of ‘Notes’, and was visiting artist-advisor at Rijksakademie, Amsterdam 1991-2007 where she was also co-editor from 2005 to 2008 of the journal ‘Documents’. Project tutor at the Jan van Eyck Akademie, Maastricht. NL. From 1994 to 2001 she was studio tutor in Fine Art at Goldsmith's College, UAL, 1984–2005.

Her works are included major public and private collections including the Tate Collection ^{,} Arts Council Collection, UK, British Council Collection, UK; Weltkunst Collection, Zurich; Berardo Collection, Lisbon, Portugal; Hirshhorn Museum and Sculpture Park, Washington DC, USA; and the Metropolitan Museum, New York, USA.
