= Alia Syed =

British artist and filmmaker (born 1964)

Alia Syed (born 1964) is an experimental filmmaker and artist of Welsh-Indian descent.

== Biography ==
Born in Swansea, Wales, Syed earned her Bachelors in Fine Arts from the University of East London in 1987 and a Postgraduate degree in Mixed Media from the Slade School of Fine Art in 1992. She has taught and lectured at Central St. Martins and the Chelsea College of Art and Design, and she is now an associate lecturer at Southampton Solent University. Syed’s work has been screened and exhibited in museums, galleries, and festivals worldwide, including at the Los Angeles County Museum of Art (LACMA), Museum of Modern Art (MoMA) in New York City, Museo Nacional Centro de Arte Reina Sofia in Madrid, Institute of International Visual Arts (inIVA) in London, and the Talwar Gallery, which has represented her for over a decade, in New York City and in New Delhi. Syed lives and works in London, UK.

Syed’s work focuses on issues of identity, representation, and language, often incorporating sound and text, in addition to images and characters, to explore and question structures of personal and collective narrative. Syed has said, “I am interested in language; we construct ourselves through language; it creates the space where we define ourselves. Film can be a mirror—it can throw things back at us in a way that makes us question the ideas we have about ourselves and through this each other…I [am] interested in what happens when you hold more than one ‘culture’ within you at any given time.”

== Selected exhibitions ==
- 2019, Yale Center of British Art, Migrating Worlds: The Art of the Moving Image in Britain, New Haven, US (2019)
- 2010, Museum of Modern Art (MoMA), On Line, curated by Connie Butler and Catherine de Zegher, New York, NY, US
- 2003, Tate Britain, A Century of Artists' Film in Britain, London, UK

== Selected films ==
- 2019, Meta Incognita: Missive II
- 2016, On a wing and a prayer (text by David Herd)
- 2008–2011, Priya
- 2006–2011, A Story Told
- 2010, Wallpaper
