= Bouchra Khalili =

Moroccan-French visual artist

- Born: 1975 (age 50–51); Casablanca
- Education: Sorbonne Nouvelle; Ecole Nationale d’Arts de Paris-Cergy

Bouchra Khalili (born 1975 in Casablanca) is a French-Moroccan artist. She graduated in Film & Media Studies at Sorbonne Nouvelle and Visual Arts at the Ecole Nationale d’Arts de Paris-Cergy.

== Work ==
Khalili works across different media including film, video, installation, photography, works on paper, textile, and editorial platforms. Her multidisciplinary practice suggests civic imaginations that can allow us to envision other ways of belonging. Film and video play a central role in her thinking. Known for complex and multilayered narrative constructions, Khalili’s filmic works draw on suppressed historical moments of collective emancipation that span diverse histories, geographies, and generations. Neither documentary nor fiction, her deeply researched “hypotheses” articulate language, oral transmission, poetic invocations, storytelling, and innovative visual forms. Experimenting with montage, Khalili’s editing process is a key tool of her narration techniques. In her films, the non-professional performers are, at the same time, the film’s storytellers and “editors”. They narrate and act out textual and visual constellations of unarchived stories of collective emancipation that were suppressed by official narratives. Putting together fragments of oral histories with personal testimonies, texts, photographs, and moving images, they dynamically activate the past while revealing its connections to the present. Summoning poetically the ghosts of unachieved promises, Khalili’s films invite viewers to become the witnesses of our history and to contemplate our potential collective future.

Accordingly, with precision and subtlety, her projects challenge hegemonic narratives about migration and statelessness, as well as the violence they engender and normalize, while also pressing contemporary art practice forward, both ethically and aesthetically.

In Khalili's video workThe Mapping Journey Project (2008-11), 8 people who have experienced displacement due to economic, political or social reasons recount their journeys around the Mediterranean. The artist said that the work is about the question: "How can we form communities that are free from the restrictive ideas of belonging shaped by the nation-state model?" Frieze named the work No.7 of "The 25 Best Works of the 21st Century"

She is a Professor and Head of Department of Artistic Strategies at die Angewandte University in Vienna, and a founding member of La Cinémathèque de Tanger, an artist-run non-profit organization devoted to promoting and developing film culture in Northern Morocco.

== Exhibitions ==
Khalili’s work has been subject to many international solo exhibitions, including at Sharjah Art Foundation (2024); EMST, Athens (2024); Moderna Museet, Stockholm (2024); Fondation Luma, Arles (2023); MACBA, Barcelona (2015, 2023); FFT Düsseldorf (2022); Bildmuseet, Umea (2021); Oslo Kunstforening and Fotogalleriet, Oslo (2020); the Museum of Fine Arts, Boston (2019); Museum Folkwang, Essen (2018); Jeu de Paume, Paris (2018); Secession, Vienna (2018); MAXXI, Rome (2018); CAAC, Sevilla (2017); Wexner Center for the Arts, Columbus (2017); MoMA, New York (2016); Palais de Tokyo, Paris (2015); PAMM, Miami (2013).

Her work was also included in collective international shows such as the Venice Biennale (2013; 2024); Sharjah Biennial (2011, 2023); Dream City, Tunis (2023); the 2nd Lahore Biennial (2020); the 12th Bamako Biennial (2019); BienalSur, Buenos Aires (2019); Documenta 14, Athens/Kassel (2017); the Milan Triennale (2017); La Triennale, Paris (2012); the 18th Biennale of Sydney (2012).

She participated to numerous collective exhibitions in international institutions such as the San Jose Museum of Arts (2024); the 3rd Thailand Biennial (2024); Kunsthaus Graz (2023); Centre Pompidou, Paris (2018, 2020, 2023); Kadist, Paris (2023); IVAM, Valencia (2023); Kunsthaus Zurich (2015, 2023); Fondazione Sandretto, Turin (2021); MAXXI, Rome (2021); Hammer Museum, Los Angeles (2021); CAM, St. Louis (2021); Art Sonje Center, Seoul (2020); Kunsthal Charlottenborg, Copenhagen (2019); Cardiff National Museum (2018); MCA, Sydney (2016); Van AbbeMuseum, Eindhoven (2014); New Museum, New York (2014); Carré d’Art, Nîmes (2013); Tropenmuseum, Amsterdam (2013); Haus Der Welt, Berlin (2010, 2013); Hayward Gallery, London (2012); South London Gallery (2012); Cité Internationale de l’Immigration, Paris (2012); Beirut Art Center (2011); Gulbenkian Foundation, Lisbon (2011); Museo Reina Sofía, Madrid (2008).

== Awards ==
In 2023, she received the Sharjah Biennial Prize. She was also the recipient of the inaugural Terry Riley Humanitarian Award (2021); the Harvard’s Radcliffe Institute Fellowship (2017-2018), the Ibsen Award (2017), the Abraaj Art Prize (2014), daad Artists-in-Berlin (2012), and the Vera List Center for Art and Politics Fellowship, New York (2011-2013).

== Selected artworks ==
- 2024: The Public Storyteller. Video Installation. Dual synchronized channel
- 2023: The Circle Project. Mixed media installation
- 2019-2022: The Magic Lantern. Mixed media installation
- 2020: Back to Abnormal. 16mm film
- 2019: The Typographer. 16mm film
- 2019: A Small Suitcase. Photography
- 2019: The Radical Ally. Publication and Mural Poster
- 2018: Twenty-Two Hours. Video Installation. Single channel
- 2017: The Tempest Society. Video Installation. Single channel
- 2015: Foreign Office. A mixed media project composed of a digital film, a series of photographs, and a silkscreen print
- 2014: Garden Conversation. Digital film. 18minutes
- 2012-2013: The Speeches Series. 3 digital films
- 2012: The Seaman. Digital film
- 2012: The Wet Feet Series. Series of photographs
- 2011: The Constellations Series. Series of 8 silkscreen prints
- 2008-2011: The Mapping Journey Project. Video installation. 8 single channels

== Selected publications and catalogues ==
- 2023: Between Circles and Constellations. Monograph Book. Museum of Contemporary Art, Barcelona
- 2021: Stories Within Stories. Monograph Book. Hatje Cantz
- 2019: The Tempest Society. Monograph Book. Book Works
- 2018: Bouchra Khalili - Blackboard. Monograph Book. Jeu de Paume
- 2015: Bouchra KHALILI - Foreign Office. Monograph Book. Sam Art Projects Collection, 12
- 2014: Here & Elsewhere. Edited by Massimiliano Gioni, Gary Carrion-Murayari, and Natalie Bell, with Negar Azimi and Kaelen Wilson-Goldie. New Museum, New York
- 2014: Freedom, KunstPalais Edition, Erlangen, Germany
- 2013: The Encyclopedic Palace: Guide Book, 55th Venice Biennale. Venice Biennale Foundation
- 2013: The Encyclopedic Palace: Catalogue, 55th Venice Biennale. Venice Biennale Foundation
- 2013: 5th Moscow Biennale, Catherine de Zegher, Moscow Biennale Foundation
- 2013: Mirages d'Orient, Grenades et Figues de Barbarie, Ed. Actes Sud Beaux-Arts
- 2012: Intense Proximity, the guidebook. Centre national des arts plastiques – Artlys
- 2012: Intense Proximity, the anthology. Centre national des arts plastiques – Artlys
- 2011: Mutations, perspectives on photography. Steidl/Paris Photo, 2011
- 2011: Plot for a Biennial. Sharjah Art Foundation
- 2010: Bouchra Khalili - Story Mapping. Monograph Book. Le Bureau des Compétences et Désirs/Presses du Réel
