= Maurice Berger =

American cultural historian, curator, and art critic (1956 - 2020)

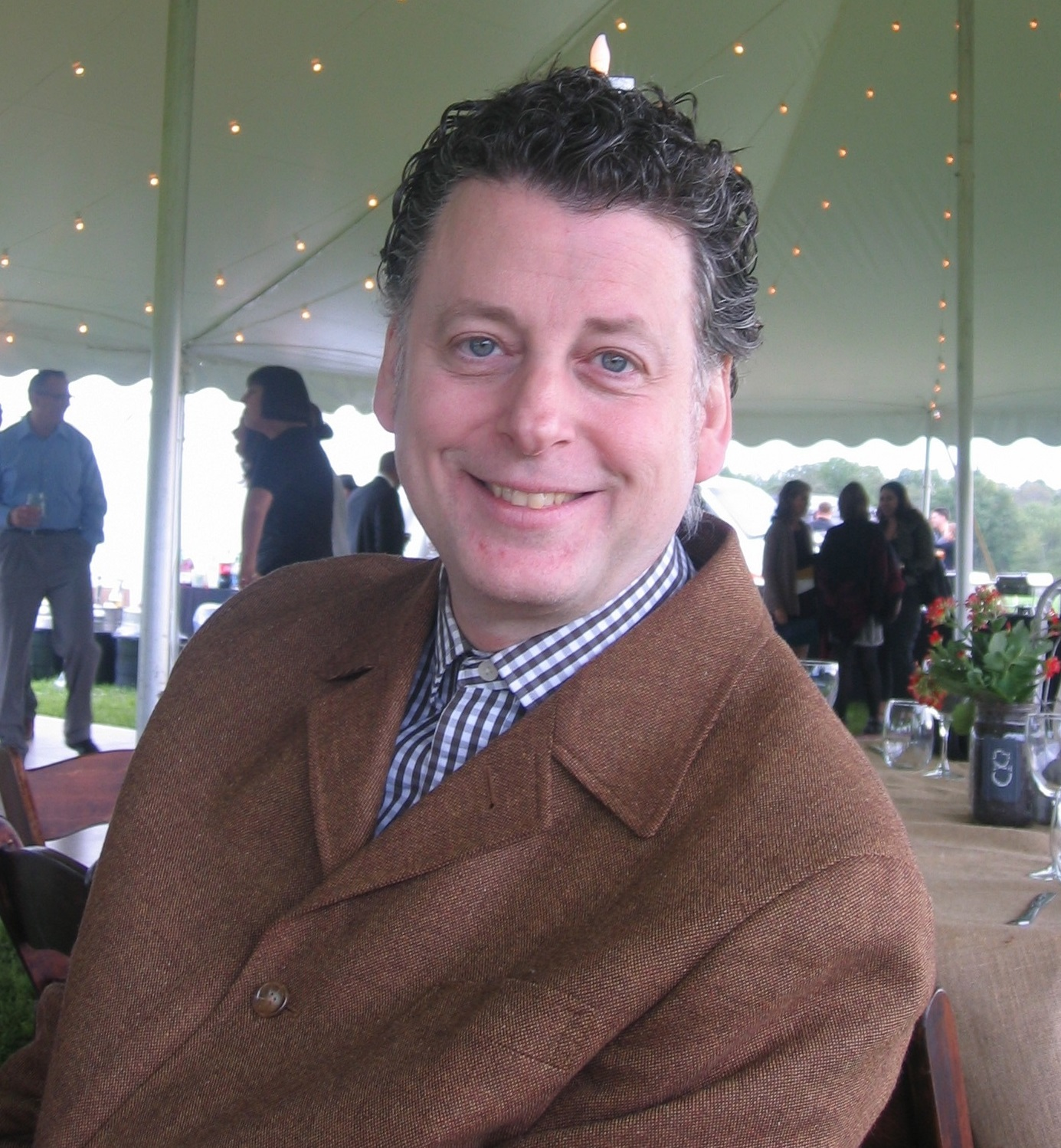
- Maurice Berger (2011)
- Born: May 22, 1956; New York City, U.S.
- Died: March 23, 2020 (aged 63); Copake, New York, U.S.
- Education: Hunter College; Graduate Center of the City University of New York
- Awards: Infinity Award, International Center of Photography, 2018, Critical Writing and Research: Race Stories; Best Exhibition in University Museum, 2010, Best Exhibition in US, 2008, Association of Art Museum Curators; Best Thematic Exhibition in New York, 2008, International Association of Art Critics; Nominee, Emmy Award, National Academy of Television Arts and Sciences, New York Chapter, 2011; Choice Outstanding Academic Title 2010, Art and Architecture, American Library Association; Arts Writers Grant, 2014 Creative Capital/Warhol Foundation
- Scientific career
- Fields: Cultural History; Critical Race Theory; Art History; Cultural Criticism
- Workplaces: University of Maryland, Baltimore County; New York Times
- Doctoral advisor: Yve-Alain Bois; Linda Nochlin
- Other academic advisors: Rosalind Krauss

Maurice Berger (May 22, 1956 – March 22, 2020) was an American cultural historian, curator, and art critic, who served as a Research Professor and Chief Curator at the Center for Art, Design and Visual Culture, University of Maryland, Baltimore County. Berger was recognized for his interdisciplinary scholarship on race and visual culture in the United States.

He curated a number of important exhibitions examining the relationship between race and American art, including the critically acclaimed For All The World To See: Visual Culture and the Struggle for Civil Rights co-organized in 2011 by the National Museum of African American History and Culture of the Smithsonian Institution and the Center for Art, Design & Visual Culture at the University of Maryland, Baltimore County, which focused on the role visual imagery played in shaping, influencing, and transforming the modern struggle for racial equality and justice in the United States.

On March 22, 2020, he fell ill and died in Copake, New York, from heart failure, exacerbated by untested complications of COVID-19. He was 63 years old.

== Biography ==
Berger grew up poor in a predominantly black and Puerto Rican public housing project on the Lower East Side of Manhattan, an experience which helped to shape his views on race. "As a Jew, I have known anti-Semitism. As a gay man, I have known homophobia," Berger wrote in the New York Times in 2017 about his childhood. "But neither has seemed as relentless as the racism I witnessed growing up — a steady drumbeat of slights, thinly-veiled hostility, and condescension perpetrated by even the most liberal and well-meaning people. It was painful to watch. And, as my friends let me know, considerably more painful to endure." Berger received a B.A. from Hunter College in 1978 and a Ph.D. in art history from The Graduate Center, CUNY in 1988.

In the mid-1980s he was an assistant professor of art and gallery director at Hunter College. His interdisciplinary project "Race and Representation", co-organized with the anthropologist Johnnetta B. Cole at Hunter College in 1987, included a book, art exhibition, and film program. His study on institutional racism, "Are Art Museums Racist?", appeared in Art in America. In the early 1990s, Berger extended his work on visual culture and race to include the sustained study of the work of African-American artists, performers, filmmakers, producers, and cultural figures, culminating both in solo exhibitions ("Adrian Piper: A Retrospective" and "Fred Wilson Objects and Installations"), multimedia projects (including compilation videos and elaborate context stations for art exhibitions), and essays (on subjects as diverse as black artists and the limitations of mainstream art criticism, the racial implications of art historical and curatorial efforts to evaluate "outsider" art, the Harlem Document project of New York's Photo League, and the photography, writing, and films of Gordon Parks)."

In 2011, he served as curator of "For All The World To See: Visual Culture and the Struggle for Civil Rights at the National Museum of African American History and Culture of the Smithsonian Institution. According to The New Yorker, the exhibition posited "the camera—and the proliferation of black images in pop culture—as a crucial weapon in shaping public opinion and motivating change in America before and during the civil-rights era." The article further states: "[Its] evidence is rich and varied including film clips of Paul Robeson, Amos 'n' Andy, the March on Washington, Malcolm X, and the Supremes, as well as a wide array of printed matter, from copies of Ebony, Jet, and Sepia to a poster for Shaft."

== Publications ==
Berger wrote the monthly Race Stories column, "a continuing exploration of the relationship of race to photographic portrayals of race", for the Lens Section of the New York Times. Berger's writings have appeared in Artforum, Art in America, the New York Times Pen America, the Village Voice, October, National Geographic, the Brooklyn Rail, Wired, and the Los Angeles Times. In addition to his eleven books, which include White Lies: Race and the Myths of Whiteness (Farrar, Straus & Giroux, 1999) and For All the World to See: Visual Culture and the Struggle for Civil Rights (Yale University Press, 2010), Berger is the author of numerous essays for anthologies and exhibition catalogs. White Lies, an experimental and largely autobiographical book, counterpoises short stories, vignettes, and analytical texts to examine the nature of whiteness as a racial category and to make it visible and comprehensible to the reader. The historian David Roediger has noted of the book, that its passages "gather classic accounts of what whiteness means . . . Berger's collage of provocations from experts on white identity coupled with bursts of poignant autobiography, destabilizes racial certainties.”

== Exhibitions ==
Berger's exhibitions on race and culture included retrospectives of the artists Adrian Piper (1999) and Fred Wilson (2001) both of which traveled extensively in the United States and Canada. In 2003, he organized White: Whiteness and Race in Contemporary Art, which featured the work of Cindy Sherman, Nayland Blake, William Kentridge, Gary Simmons, Paul McCarthy, Nikki S. Lee, Andrea Robbins and Max Becher, and Mike Kelley, among others. Berger advocated for more aggressive educational outreach and broader cultural and social context for high art in museums and created complex, multi-media "context stations" for numerous exhibitions, including Action/Abstraction: Pollock, De Kooning, and American Art, 1940–1976 at the Jewish Museum (2008) and Black Male: Representations of Masculinity, 1968–1994 (1994) and The American Century: Art & Culture, 1950–2000, (1999), both at the Whitney Museum of American Art, in New York City.

In 2015, Berger designed and curated an exhibition titled Revolution of the Eye: Modern Art and the Birth of American Television in dedication to how the emergence of stylistic avant-garde art from the late 1940s to the mid-1970s influenced the role of television as an entertainment medium and vice versa. The exhibition was organized by the Jewish Museum, New York and the Center for Art, Design, and Visual Culture of the University of Maryland. In Vanessa R. Schwartz's review of the overall exhibition, she summarizes the entire experience as an intermingling conglomerate of art, entertainment, and commerce, highlighting the major underlying theme that there is little distinction between the constructed definitions of art and media. The exhibition showcases television's role in promoting artistic experimentation, its contributions to the contemporary art scene, and its pivotal influence in shaping the era's characteristic cutting-edge aesthetics. A hardcover literature edition of the exhibition, published on May 12, 2015, has also been made available for purchase on the Yale University Press. As reviewed by Hayan Kim, doctoral candidate at the University of Illinois, the Revolution of the Eye: Modern Art and the Birth of American Television consists of two major parts: a seven-section analytical essay that illuminates the relationship between pop cultural artistic movements and the technological advancements in telemedia in addition to a cultural timeline that provides an accessible representation of the evolution of modern American art. Revolution of the Eye: Modern Art and the Birth of American Television has also been made available as a virtual exhibition, organized by the Center for Art, Design, and Visual Culture of University of Maryland, Baltimore County.

== Media projects ==
From the mid-1990s on Berger produced cinematic “culture stories,” syncopated compilations of historic clips from American film and television that explore issues of identity and self-representation. His film Threshold was featured in the 2012 Whitney Biennial. The film was inspired by his conversations with Alicia Hall Moran and Jason Moran about their ideas for Bleed, their residency for the biennial. Threshold is a continuum of images from popular culture produced during the period of or about the historic civil rights movement. Critic Ben Ratliff, writing in the New York Times, observed that " Threshold strung together clips from movies and television shows of African-Americans beginning various journeys, passages or challenges: Diana Ross and Michael Jackson on the yellow brick road in “The Wiz”; dancers on “Soul Train”; Denzel Washington as Malcolm X stepping up to a podium. The mood of that film carried through the whole week: moving forward, crossing lines, evolving."

== Awards and honors ==
For his Race Stories column for the Lens Section of the New York Times, Berger was the recipient of the 2018 Infinity Award from the International Center of Photography and the 2014 Arts Writers Grant from Creative Capital | Andy Warhol Foundation. He received multiple grants from the National Endowment for the Humanities, National Endowment for the Arts, Andy Warhol Foundation for the Visual Arts, Peter Norton Family Foundation, Trellis Fund, and J. Patrick Lannon Foundation. For his work on the “For All the World to See” segment of WNET's Sunday Arts, Berger received an Emmy Award nomination from the National Academy of Television Arts and Sciences, New York chapter. His book White Lies: Race and the Myths of Whiteness (Farrar, Straus & Giroux, 1999) was named as a finalist for the 2000 Horace Mann Bond Book Award of Harvard University and received an honorable mention from the Gustavus Myers Outstanding Book Award from Boston University School of Social Work. His companion book for For All the World to See (Yale, 2010) was named Choice Outstanding Academic Title 2010, Art and Architecture from the American Library Association.

In 1993, Berger was appointed as the inaugural Fellow at the Vera List Center for Art and Politics, where he helmed numerous programs and publications including the first compilation celebrating The New School Art Collection, Patrons of Progress. The Vera List Center Forum 2020 opened with a tribute to Berger, gathering friends, colleagues, and allies for a celebration of his legacy.

== Death ==
Berger died due to presumed complications from COVID-19 on March 22, 2020. He was 63.
