= Edith Dekyndt =

Belgian artist (born 1960)

Edith Dekyndt (born 1960; Ypres) is a visual artist.

Her work observes, identifies, and transforms the performative phenomenology of ordinary materials, objects, and gestures.

She lives and works in Brussels and Berlin.

== Work and career ==
Dekyndt established herself as an artist in the mid-1990s. Since then, she has become best known for working with everyday objects. These are typically forced into a transformation that leads to material transcendence, be it by means of chemical and physical reactions, or deceptively simple interactions with the human body. The documentation of such processes is essential to the work, which ranges across all sorts of media: video, photography, sound, installation, and performance. Dekyndt also channels in her art a myriad of influences, from literature, art history, philosophy, to science.

Dekyndt is represented internationally by industry-leading galleries: Galerie Konrad Fischer and Karin Guenther in Germany, Greta Meert in Belgium, and Carl Freedman in the UK.

== Selected exhibitions ==
=== Solo exhibitions ===
- Ne pas laver le sable jaune, Galerie Greta Meert, Brussels, BE (2023)
- l'Origine des choses, Bourse du Commerce, Paris, France (2023)
- Area of Inertia, Laennec Chapel, Pinault Collection, Paris, France (2022)
- Concentrated Form of Non-Material Energy, St. Matthäus Kirche, Berlin, Allemagne (2022)
- Visitation Zone, Riga International Biennal of Contemporary Art, Riga, Lettonie (2020);
- The Ghost Year, Galerie Greta Meert, Brussels, BE (2020)
- They shoot Horses, (Part 2), «Biennalsur», Bienal Internacional de Arte Contemporaneo de America del Sur, Museo de la inmigración, Buenos Aires, AR (2019)
- The Black The White The Blue, Kunsthaus Hamburg, Hamburg, DE (2019)
- The Lariat, VNH galerie, Paris, FR (2019)
- Blind Objects, Carl Freedman Gallery, London, UK (2017)
- Slow Objects, The Common Guild, Glasgow, UK (2017)
- Air, rain, pain, wind, sweat, tears, fear, yeast, heat, pleasure, salt, dust, dreams, odors, noises, humidity, DAAD Gallery, Berlin, DE (2016)
- Strange Fruits, Greta Meert Gallery, Brussels, BE (2016)
- Ombre indigène, Wiels, Brussels, BE (2016)
- Mer Sans Rivages, Musée de l’Abbaye de sainte-Croix (Partnered with le FRAC des Pays de la Loire), Les sables d’Olonne, FR (2016)
- Théorème des Foudres, Le Consortium, Dijon (2015)
- Chronology Of Tears, Galerie Greta Meert, Brussels, BE (2015)
- Slow Stories, FOCUS Résonance, Biennale de Lyon, La BF 15, FR (2013)
- Mexican Vanities, Carl Freedman Gallery, London, UK (2013)
- La femme de Loth, Synagogue de Delme, FR (2011)
- Dieu rend visite à Newton, FRIART, Centre d’Art Contemporain, Friburg, CH (2011)
- Les Ondes de Love, Musée d’Art Contemporain du Grand’Hornu, BE (2009)
- Agnosia, Witte de With, Rotterdam, NL (2009)
- Any Resemblance To Persons, Living or Dead is Purely Coincidental, BPS 22, Charleroi, BE (2004)
- Laboratory 01, Espace l’Escaut, Brussels, BE (1995)

=== Group exhibitions ===
- Icônes, Punta della Dogana, Venise, Italie (2023)
- They Shoot Horses, Kunsthalle Hamburg, Hamburg, DE (2019)
- Luogo e Segni, Punta della dogana – Pinault collection, Venice, IT (2019)
- Viva Arte Viva: 57th Biennale Arte Venezia, Arsenale, Venice, IT (2017)
- Slow Objects, The Common Guild, Glasgow, UK (2017)
- Notes on our Equilibrium, CAB Art Center, Brussels, BE (2017)
- The Belgian Art Prize 2017, Bozar, Brussels, BE (2017)
- Broken White, Design Academy Eindhoven and the Van Abbemuseum, Eindhoven, NL (2016)
- Laboratoire de l’art, Musée des Arts et Métiers, Paris, FR (2016)
- Seeing Round Corners, Turner Contemporary, Margate, UK (2016)
- Migration Birds, Film, Art Basel, Basel, CH (2016)
- The Future of the Memory, Kunsthalle Wien, Vienna, AT (2015)
- Blue Times, Kunsthalle Wien, Vienna, AT (2014)
- It Ain’t Whatcha Write / It’s The Way Atcha Write It, Manifesta Foundation, Amsterdam / NL (2014)
- Art Of Its Own Making, The Pulitzer Foundation for the Arts, St. Louis, US (2014)
- New Ways of Doing Nothing, Kunsthalle Wien, Vienna, AT (2014)
- The 5th Moscow Biennale, Manege, Moscow, RU (2013)
- Space Odyssey 2.0, Z33 – House for Contemporary Art, Hasselt, BE (2013)
- S.F. / Art / sciences & fictions, Mac's, Hornu, BE (2012)
- Raak, S.M.A.K., Ghent, BE(2011)
- Constellations, FRAC Picardie, Amiens, FR (2011)
- Contour, 5th Biennal of Moving Image, Mechelen, BE (2011)
- Into The Light, Koninklijk Museum voor Schone Kunsten, Antwerpen, BE (2010)
- On Line. Drawing Transforming through the 20th Century, MOMA, NY, US (2010)
- The Moon is an Arrant, The David Robert Foundation, London, UK (2010)
- Ocean, Musée de la mer, Biarritz, FR (2010)
- Before Present, Centre d’Art Contemporain Villa du Parc, Annemasse, FR (2010)
- Silence / a Composition, Contemporary Art Museum, Hiroshima, JP (2009)
- In Time, Robert Miller Gallery, New York, US (2009)
- Faux- Jumeaux, S.M.A.K., Ghent, BE (2009)
- Nos (Us), Museu da Republica, Rio de Janeiro, BR (2009)
- Political / Minimal, KW Institute for Contemporary Art, Berlin, DE (2008)
- Brussels Biennial, Midi Station, BE, selection Witte de With, Rotterdam, NL (2008)

== Selected public collections ==
- Museum of Modern Art (MoMA) / New York / US
- Albright-Knox Collection / Buffalo / New York / US
- Progressive Collection / Cleveland / US
- Cranford Collection / London / UK
- Witte de Whit Museum / Amsterdam / NL
- Centre National des Arts Plastiques (CNAP) / FR
- FRAC Picardie / FR
- FRAC Lorraine / FR
- FRAC des Pays de La Loire / FR
- FRAC Alsace / FR
- FRAC Réunion / FR
- Musée d’Art Contemporain (MAC's) / Le Grand Hornu / BE
- Musée d’Ixelles / Brussels / BE
- Banque Nationale de Belgique / BE
- Communauté Française de Belgique / BE
- B.P.S. 22 Centre de Création Contemporaine / Charleroi / BE
- Collection de la Province de Hainaut / BE
