= Alwar Balasubramaniam =

Indian artist (born 1971)

Bala
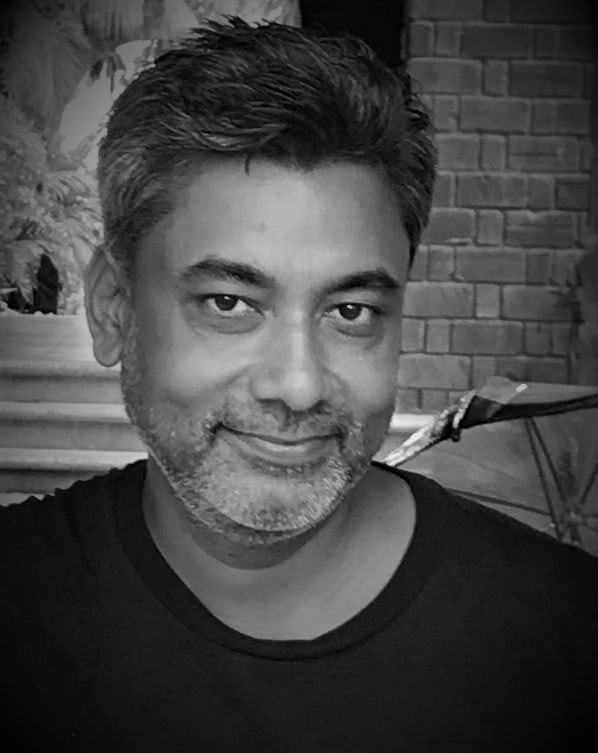
- Born: Alwar Balasubramaniam; 1971 (age 54–55); Tamil Nadu, India
- Education: Government College of Fine Arts, BFA, 1990 – 1995; Edinburgh Printmakers, 1997 – 1998; University of Applied Arts Vienna, 1998 – 1999
- Children: 1

Alwar Balasubramaniam (Tamil: ஆழ்வார் பாலசுப்ரமணியம், Hindi: अलवर बालासुब्रमण्यम, born 1971), known professionally as Bala, is an Indian sculptor and artist.

== Biography ==
Alwar Balasubramaniam was born in 1971, in Tamil Nadu. In 1995, Bala graduated from Government College of Fine Arts with a specialism in printmaking. Bala continued his studies at the Edinburgh Printmakers and the University of Applied Arts Vienna.

From 1998 – 2015 Bala lived and worked in Bengaluru, Karnataka. As of 2015, Bala lives and works in his ancestral village outside of Tirunelveli, Tamil Nadu.

Bala is known for embedding sculptures in walls. Bala's work centers on the human body and the body's interaction with the material environment and intangible elements such as light, air, and shadow. In 1998, Bala was an artist-in-residence at the then MacDowell Colony, and worked in the Putnam graphics studio. Bala was also part of the UNESCO Aschberg Bursaries for Artists for Residency program in Vienna, Austria a year later, and was a featured speaker at TEDIndia in 2009.

His work has since been exhibited by major institutions such as the Mori Art Museum; the Kiran Nadar Museum of Art (KNMA); the Seattle Art Museum; the Lalbhai Museum in Ahmedabad, India; and the Essl Museum in Vienna. Notable solo and group exhibitions include Afterlives: Contemporary Art in the Byzantine Crypt at The Metropolitan Museum of Art (MET) (January 2024 - January 2027), Seeing Differently: The Phillips Collects for a New Century at The Phillips Collection (March - September 2021), On Line: Drawing Through the Twentieth Century at The Museum of Modern Art (MoMA) (November 2010 - February 2011), Beyond the Self: Contemporary Portraiture from Asia at Australia's National Portrait Gallery (August - November 2011), Contemplating the Void: Interventions in the Guggenheim Museum at the Guggenheim Museum (February - April 2010), and Indian Summer at the École des Beaux Arts (October - December 2005).

Bala's art has also been presented in international exhibitions such as the 1st Singapore Biennale and the 18th Sydney Biennale. In February 2026, he was selected as one of five artists at the 61st Venice Biennale’s India Pavilion, presenting Drift (2026) and Not just for us (2026).
