= Joëlle Tuerlinckx =

Belgian artist

- Born: 1958 (age 67–68); Brussels

Joëlle Tuerlinckx (born 1958) is a Belgian artist.

She was born in Brussels where she lives and works.

Tuerlinckx combines found objects, drawings, collages, film, video and slide projections in her installations. Her work has been displayed in solo exhibitions at the Wiels art centre in Brussels, at the Haus der Kunst in Munich, at the Kunstmuseum Basel in Switzerland and at the Drawing Center in New York City. She also participated in documenta X in Kassel. A retrospective of her work was presented in Brussels, Munich and at the Arnolfini in Bristol. She was also chosen to participate in Skulptur Projekte Münster in 2017.

In 2008, she received the Cultuurprijzen Vlaanderen for visual arts and, in 2007, the Plantin Moretus Award.

Her work is included in various private and public collections in Belgium, France, the Netherlands and the United States.
