= Nancy Spero =

American artist (1926–2009)

- Spero in her New York Studio in 1973
- Born: August 24, 1926; Cleveland, Ohio, U.S.
- Died: October 18, 2009 (aged 83); New York City, New York, U.S.
- Education: School of the Art Institute of Chicago (BFA); Beaux-Arts de Paris (attended)
- Spouse: Leon Golub

Nancy Spero (August 24, 1926 – October 18, 2009) was an American visual artist known for her political and feminist paintings and hand pulled art prints.

Born in Cleveland, Ohio, Spero lived for much of her life in New York City. She married and collaborated with artist Leon Golub. As both artist and activist, Nancy Spero had a career that spanned fifty years. She is known for her continuous engagement with contemporary political, social, and cultural concerns. Spero chronicled wars and apocalyptic violence as well as articulating visions of ecstatic rebirth and the celebratory cycles of life. Her complex network of collective and individual voices was a catalyst for the creation of her figurative lexicon representing women from prehistory to the present in such epic-scale paintings and collage on paper as Torture of Women (1976), Notes in Time on Women (1979) and The First Language (1981). In 2010, Notes in Time was posthumously reanimated as a digital scroll in the online magazine Triple Canopy. Spero has had a number of retrospective exhibitions at major museums.

== Early years ==
Spero was born in Cleveland, Ohio in 1926. A year later her family moved to Chicago, where she grew up. After graduating from New Trier High School, she studied at the School of the Art Institute of Chicago, and graduated in 1949. Among Spero's peers at the Art Institute was a young GI who had returned from service in World War II, Leon Golub. Spero and Golub exhibited at the Hyde Park Art Center in Chicago as part of the group the Monster Roster. After graduating from the Art Institute of Chicago, Spero continued to study painting in Paris at the École nationale supérieure des Beaux-Arts and at the Atelier of André Lhote, an early Cubist painter, teacher and critic. Soon after her return to the United States in 1950, she married Leon Golub, and the two artists settled in Chicago.

From 1956 to 1957, Spero and Golub lived and collaborated in Italy, while raising their three sons. Spero and Golub were equally committed to exploring a modernist representation of the human form, with its narratives and art historical resonances, even as Abstract Expressionism was becoming the dominant idiom. In Florence and Ischia, Spero became intrigued by the format, style and mood of Etruscan and Roman frescoes and sarcophagi which would have influence on her later work. Finding a more varied, inclusive and international atmosphere in Europe than in the New York art world of the time, Spero and her family moved to Paris, living there from 1959 to 1964. Spero's third son was born in Paris, and the artist had major solo exhibitions in Paris at Galerie Breteau in 1962, 1964, and 1968. During this period, Spero painted a series titled Black Paintings depicting themes including mothers and children, lovers, prostitutes, and hybrid, human-animal forms. This collection of works has a more personal meaning for her, rather than political.

== Later years ==
Spero and Golub returned to New York in 1964, where the couple remained to live and work. The Vietnam War was raging and the Civil Rights Movement was exploding. Affected by images of the war broadcast nightly on television and the unrest and violence evident in the streets, Spero began her War Series from 1966 to 1970. These small gouache and inks on paper, executed rapidly, represented the obscenity and destruction of war.

An activist and early feminist, Spero was a member of the Art Workers Coalition (1968–69), Women Artists in Revolution (1969), and Ad Hoc Committee of Women Artists (1971) the work of which developed into the first women's cooperative gallery, A.I.R. Gallery (Artists in Residence) in SoHo, of which she was a founding member. It was during this period that Spero completed her "Artaud Paintings" (1969–70), finding her artistic "voice" and developing her signature scroll paintings, the Codex Artaud (1971–1972), in which she directly quoted the writings of the poet and playwright Antonin Artaud. Uniting text and image, printed on long scrolls of paper, glued end-to-end and tacked on the walls of A.I.R., Spero violated the formal presentation, choice of valued medium and scale of framed paintings. Although her collaged and painted scrolls were Homeric in both scope and depth, the artist shunned the grandiose in content as well as style, relying instead on intimacy and immediacy, while also revealing the continuum of shocking political realities underlying enduring myths. In a 2008 interview in The Brooklyn Rail with publisher Phong Bui, Spero says of her early identification with Artaud: "For me, the spoken words were part of the body, as if whatever I was trying to paint, and my own awareness of pain and anger—you can call it the destruction of the self—was an integral part, that duality. Things get split up right in the middle, which I was very much interested in at that moment in my life."

In 1974, Spero chose to focus on themes involving women and their representation in various cultures. Her Torture in Chile (1974) and the long scroll, Torture of Women (1976, 20 inches x 125 feet), interweave oral testimonies with images of women throughout history, linking the contemporary governmental brutality of Latin American dictatorships (from Amnesty International reports) with the historical repression of women. Spero re-presented previously obscured women's histories, cultural mythology, and literary references with her expressive figuration. Rarely exhibited, Torture of Women was translated into book form in 2009.

Spero manifested a desire for women to be a part of the art conversation. Spero's most mature work lives along the lines of a peinture feminine. This is when a woman is the subject as well as the "artistic consciousness". Spero's open-ended, thought provoking compositions of ruthless uncomfortable subject matter was depicted in hangings and friezes. This is seen in Helicopter, Victim, Astronaut, made in 1968 of gouache and ink on paper. Spero uses the crimes and assaults on women from all eras and cultures to provide intense and emotional imagery for her art and text. Political violence, sexism, and life-threatening situations that women endure are subjects she explored throughout her career, but especially in the 1960s and 19702. These interests are evidence of Spero's conviction that "the personal and the political are indistinguishable." Spero was influenced by Jean Dubuffet, Antonin Artaud, Simone de Beauvoir; and Hélène Cixous.

Developing a pictographic language of body gestures and motion, a bodily hieroglyphics, Spero reconstructed the diversity of representations of women from pre-history to the present. From 1976 through 1979, she researched and worked on Notes in Time on Women, a 20 inch by 210 foot paper scroll. She elaborated and amplified this theme in The First Language (1979–81, 20 inches by 190 feet), eschewing text altogether in favor of an irregular rhythm of painted, hand-printed, and collaged figures, thus creating her "cast of characters." In 1983, Spero began using, in her large scroll paintings, an exuberantly vaginal female figure going by the name of Sheela-na-gig. The acknowledgement of Spero's international status as a preeminent figurative and feminist artist was signaled in 1987 by her traveling retrospective exhibitions in the United States and United Kingdom. By 1988, she developed her first wall installations. For these installations, Spero extended the picture plane of the scrolls by moving her printed images directly onto the walls of museums and public spaces.

Harnessing a capacious imaginative energy and a ferocious will, Spero continued to mine the full range of power relations. In 1987, following retrospective exhibitions in the United Kingdom, the United States and Canada, the artist created images that leapt from the scroll surface to the wall surface, refiguring representational forms of women over time and engaging in a dialogue with architectural space. Spero's wall paintings in Chicago, Vienna, Dresden, Toronto, and Derry form poetic reconstructions of the diversity of representations of women from the ancient to the contemporary world, validating a subjectivity of female experience.

Spero expressed her art once in this way: "I've always sought to express a tension in form and meaning in order to achieve a veracity. I have come to the conclusion that the art world has to join us, women artists, not we join it. When women are in leadership roles and gain rewards and recognition, then perhaps 'we' (women and men) can all work together in art world actions."

Nancy Spero died of heart failure in Manhattan on October 18, 2009. She is buried in Green-Wood Cemetery, in Brooklyn, New York.

She was interviewed about her life and work in a 2007 episode of the modern art documentary series Art:21 and for the 2010 film !Women Art Revolution.

== Honors ==
2006

- Elected a member of the American Academy of Arts and Letters.

2005

- Lifetime Achievement Award from the College Art Association

2003

- Honor Award from the Women's Caucus for Art

1995

- Hiroshima Art Prize (awarded jointly to Spero and Golub) from the Hiroshima City Museum of Contemporary Art

1995

- Skowhegan Medal from the Skowhegan School of Painting and Sculpture

== Media appearances ==
- Spero as herself, Nancy Spero: Becoming an Artist, 2008
- Spero as herself, !Women Art Revolution, 2010
- Spero as herself, Nancy Spero: Collaboration, 2012
- Spero as herself, Nancy Spero: Paper Mirror, 2019

== See also ==
- Chicago Imagists
- Feminist art movement in the United States

== Sources ==
- Arkesteijn, Roel, Codex Spero. Nancy Spero Selected Writing and Interviews 1950-2008. Roma Publications, 2008. ISBN 978-90-77459-28-7
- Bird, Jon ed., Otherworlds: The Art of Nancy Spero and Kiki Smith (London: Reaktion Books, Ltd., 2003)
- Bird, Jon, Jo Anna Isaak, and Sylvere Lotringer, Nancy Spero (London: Phaidon Press Limited, 1996)
- Bird, Jon and Lisa Tickner, Nancy Spero, exhib. cat. (London: Institute of Contemporary Arts, 1987)
- Breerette, Geneviève, Spero, The Paris Black Paintings, 2007 (ISBN 978-2-86882-081-5)
- Buchloh, Benjamin, "Spero's Other Traditions", in: Inside the Visible, edited by Catherine de Zegher, MIT Press, 1996
- Frizzell, Deborah, “Nancy Spero’s War Maypole: Take No Prisoners”, Cultural Politics v. 5, no. 1 (March 2009)
- Frizzell, Deborah, "Nancy Spero's Museum Incursions: Isis on the Threshold," Woman's Art Journal v. 27, no.2 (Fall/Winter 2006)
- Frizzell, Deborah, "Nancy Spero's Installations and Institutional Incursions, 1987-2001; Dialogues Within the Museum, and Elsewhere," (Ph.D. Dissertation, Graduate Center of CUNY, 2004)
- Frizzell, Deborah and Susanne Altmann, Nancy Spero: A Continuous Present, exhib. cat. (Kiel, Germany: Kunsthalle zu Kiel and the University of Kiel, 2002)
- Harris, Susan, Nancy Spero, exhib. cat. (Malmö: Malmö Konsthall, 1994)
- Harris, Susan, Nancy Spero: Weighing the Heart Against a Feather of Truth (Spain: Santiago de Compostela, Centro Galego de Arte Contemporanea, 2005)
- Heartney, Eleanor; Posner, Helaine; Princenthal, Nancy; Scott, Sue (2013). After the Revolution: Women Who Transformed Contemporary Art. Prestel Publishing Ltd. pp. 54–83. ISBN 978-3-7913-4755-4.
- Jewish Women's Archive Nancy Spero page
- Julian, Linda ed., Nancy Spero, 1993 Emrys Journal, exhib. cat. (Greenville, South Carolina: Greenville County Museum of Art, 1993)
- Lyon, Christopher, Nancy Spero: The Work (Munich and New York: Prestel, 2010) ISBN 978-3-7913-4416-4
- Macgregor, Elizabeth A. and Catherine de Zegher, Nancy Spero, exhib. cat., (Birmingham, U.K.: Ikon Gallery, 1998)
- Nahas, Dominique ed., Nancy Spero: Works Since 1950, exhib. cat. (Syracuse, New York: Everson Museum of Art, 1987)
- PBS, Biography, interviews, essays, artwork images and video clips from PBS series Art:21 -- Art in the Twenty-First Century - Season 4 (2007)
- Purdom, Judy, "Nancy Spero and Woman in Performance", in Florence, P. and Foster, N. (eds.), Differential Aesthetics, Ashgate, 2000. ISBN 0-7546-1493-X
- Stiles, Kristine and Peter Selz eds., Nancy Spero. "Woman as Protagonist: Interview with Jeanne Siegel", in Theories and Documents of Contemporary Art, Berkeley: University of California Press, 1996, pp. 244–246. ISBN 0-520-20253-8
- Storr, Robert et Leon Golub, The War Series (1966-1970), 2003 (ISBN 88-8158-457-3)
- Walker, Joanna S., 'Nancy Spero 1926-2009', Art Monthly, no. 332 (Dec-Jan 09–10)
- Walker, Joanna S., 'An Encounter with Nancy Spero', n.paradoxa, Vol. 24 (July 2009)
- Walker, Joanna S., 'The body is present even if in disguise: tracing the trace in the art work of Nancy Spero and Ana Mendieta', Tate Papers, Issue 11 (Spring 2009). See https://web.archive.org/web/20110109200439/http://www.tate.org.uk/research/tateresearch/tatepapers/09spring/joanna-walker.shtm
- Walker, Joanna S., Review of Nancy Spero's retrospective at MACBA, Art Monthly, no. 320 (October 2008)
- Walker, Joanna S., "Nancy Spero: An Encounter in Three Parts. Performance, Poetry and Dance" (PhD Thesis, University College London, 2008)
- Weskott, Hanne, Nancy Spero in der Glyptothek, Arbeiten auf Papier, 1981–1991, exhib. cat. (Munich: Glyptothek am Koenigsplatz Muenchen, 1991)
