= Andrea Robbins and Max Becher =

American artist duo

- Education: Andrea Robbins; Cooper Union School of Art; Hunter College; Max Becher; Cooper Union School of Art; Rutgers University
- Occupation: Artist duo
- Known for: Photography; Video art
- Movement: Contemporary art Conceptual art

Andrea Robbins (born 1963 in Boston, Massachusetts) and Max Becher (born 1964 in Düsseldorf) are U.S.-based visual artists. They have worked collaboratively since they met at the Cooper Union in New York in 1984. They married in 1988.

== Education ==
Andrea Robbins received her BFA from the Cooper Union School of Art and then attended Hunter College School of Art, both in New York City. Max Becher received his BFA from the Cooper Union School of Art, and his MFA from Mason Gross School of the Arts at Rutgers University.

== Work ==
Robbins and Becher employ photography, video and other digital media to document what they term "the transportation of place," situations in which one place or culture strongly resembles another distant one. Their conception of place often includes such notions as location in time, positions of ideology and cultural identity. Past subjects of their work have included German colonial towns in Namibia; Germans who dress as Native Americans; descendants of freed American slaves in the Dominican Republic; a Brooklyn Hasidic headquarters building that has been copied and rebuilt around the world; the relocated London Bridge in Lake Havasu, Arizona; the replication of Venice at The Venetian, Las Vegas; and the enduring culture of African American cowboys.

== Exhibitions and reviews ==
The work of Robbins and Becher has been exhibited and collected by art museums such as the Solomon R. Guggenheim Museum, (New York, NY and Bilbao, Spain), the Whitney Museum of American Art, (New York, NY), the Jewish Museum (New York, NY), the Museum of Contemporary Art (Chicago, IL.), the Museum of Contemporary Photography (Chicago, IL), the Los Angeles County Museum of Art, Los Angeles, CA, Barcelona Museum of Contemporary Art (Barcelona, Spain),Maison européenne de la photographie (Paris, France), San Francisco Museum of Modern Art, Museum Kunstpalast (Düsseldorf, Germany), and the SK Stiftung Kultur (Cologne, Germany). Their work has been reviewed or featured in publications such as Artforum, Art in America, Art News, Blindspot Magazine, October, Art on Paper, The New York Times, The Washington Post, Frankfurter Allgemeine, Die Zeit, Welt am Sonntag, and many others.

== Books ==
- "Portraits," with essays by Maurice Berger, and Andrea Robbins and Max Becher, 2008, Publisher, University of Maryland Baltimore County, MA. ISBN 978-1-890761-11-0
- "The Transportation of Place," with essays by Lucy Lippard and Maurice Berger, 2006. Publisher: Aperture Press, New York. ISBN 978-1-59711-010-5
- "Brooklyn Abroad." with essays by Nora Alter and Rupert Pfab, May 2006. Publisher Sonnabend Gallery and Museum Kunstpalast.
- "Contact sheet 98: Andrea Robbins and Max Becher: German Indians and Bavarian by Law," with essays by Gary Hesse and Jolene Rickard, 1998. Publisher: Light Work, Syracuse, NY. ISSN 1064-640X
- "Andrea Robbins and Max Becher," with essays by Benjamin Buchloh, Catherine de Zegher, Everlyn Nicodemus, and Luc Lang, 1994. Publisher: Kanaal Art Foundation, Kortrijk and de Vleeshal, Middleburg, The Netherlands ASIN: B001QC688Y

== Residencies and awards ==
- Artist-in-Residence, The Altos de Chavón Cultural Center Foundation, La Romana, Dominican Republic (affiliated with Parsons School of Design, New York) summer 1999
- Grant Recipient Artists-in-Residence, Light Work Foundation, winter 1995
- Leopold Godowsky, Jr. Color Photography Award, 2005
- Cooper Union President's Citation for Art, 2011
