= Geta Brătescu =

Romanian visual artist (1926–2018)

- Self-Portrait – Mrs Oliver in her traveling costume
- Born: Georgina Comanescu; 4 May 1926; Ploiești, Romania
- Died: 19 September 2018 (aged 92); Bucharest, Romania
- Movement: Conceptual art

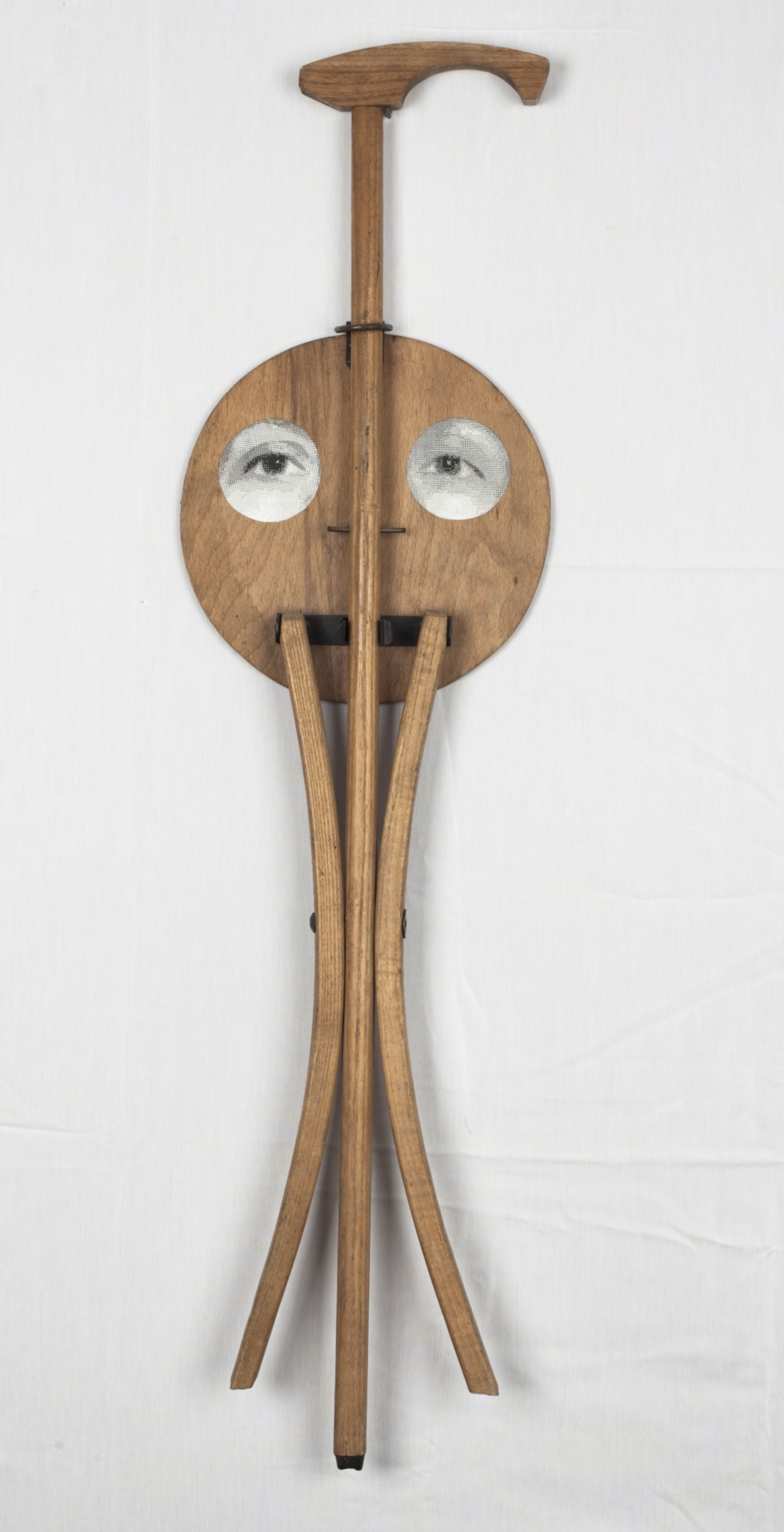
Geta Brătescu, Traveller, 1970. Collection of the Museum of Modern Art, Warsaw

Geta Brătescu (4 May 1926 – 19 September 2018) was a Romanian visual artist with works in drawing, collage, photography, performance, illustration and film.

In 2008, Brătescu received an honorary doctorate from the Bucharest National University of Arts for "her outstanding contributions to the development of contemporary Romanian art". Brătescu was artistic director of literature and art magazine Secolul 21. A major retrospective of her work was held at the National Museum of Art of Romania in December 1999. In 2015 Brătescu's first UK solo exhibition was held at the Tate Liverpool. In 2017, she was selected to represent Romania at the 57th Venice Biennale.

== Biography ==
Brătescu studied at the Faculty of Letters, University of Bucharest, between 1945 and 1949 under George Călinescu and Tudor Vianu, and at the Academy of Fine Arts under Camil Ressu. She was expelled from the latter before completing her degree due to the rise of the Communist party - since her parents owned property, she was deemed 'of bad origins'. In 1969 she returned to university, and studied at the Institute of Fine Arts "Nicolae Grigorescu" until 1971. She studied literature alongside art, and a close relationship between art and writing is present in much of her work.

The Romanian public sphere in the 1970s and 1980s was one of fragmented socialism, where radical forms of aesthetic provocation were not tolerated. This pressure of censorship pushed Brătescu and other artists to work solely within the privacy of their own studios. Perhaps the work most reflective of Brătescu's experience of censorship and politically motivated performances was her 1978 collage of provocative self-portraits titled Censored Self Portrait. In these photographs, Brătescu depicted herself with her mouth and eyes sealed by a paper strip, to metaphorically express her inability to speak freely in the current public sphere at the time.

Following exclusion from her fine art course, Brătescu worked as an arts editor, illustrator and animator, and also carried out documentation trips both in Romania and abroad for the Artist's Union. Once she returned to university, as a fine art student she had access to a studio which became the subject of a series of works throughout the 1970s that looked at the studio as a place to redefine the self. In perhaps her most famous film, The Studio (1978), made with Ion Grigorescu in a new studio at the Artist's Union, she measures her size in the space, marking her place in the world.

Other works by Bratescu from this period raise questions of self-identity and dematerialisation, such as the performance and photography work Towards White. In the 1980s Brătescu began working with textiles, describing this practice as 'drawing with a sewing machine'.

Brătescu was interested in numerous literary figures, including Aesop, Faust and Medea. The latter, a somewhat anti-feminine figure who killed her children, was the subject of a series of textile works made using scraps of cloth given to Brătescu by her mother, reflecting Brătescu's complex relationship with feminism. Throughout Brătescu's works the line is a dominant feature, functioning as a mode of definition, measurement and movement, from the classical draughtsmanship of Hands (1974–76) to the body performing in space in The Studio (1978). Creating lines through material continued within Brătescu's practice within the series of collages Jeu des Formes (Game of Forms).

In 2017, Romania's Culture Ministry selected Brătescu to represent Romania at the 57th Venice Biennale. She presented a piece of work entitled Geta Brătescu — Appearances. She had participated in the Biennale twice before – in 1960 as part of a group exhibition, and in 2013 at the Central Pavilion, alongside fellow Romanian artists Ștefan Bertalan and Andra Ursuta.

== Death ==
Brătescu died on 19 September 2018 at the age of 92.

== Art market ==
Brătescu has been represented by Hauser & Wirth since 2017.

== Selected exhibitions ==
- 2018 – Geta Brătescu. The Leaps of Aesop, Hauser & Wirth, Los Angeles, Los Angeles CA
- 2017 – Geta Brătescu. The Leaps of Aesop, Hauser & Wirth, New York NY
- 2017 – Geta Brătescu – Apariţii (Geta Brătescu – Apparitions), Venice Biennale Romanian Pavilion, Venice, Italy

== Writings ==
- De la Veneția la Veneția. Jurnal de calatorie (Meridiane, Bucharest, 1970)
- Atelier Continuu (Cartea Românească, Bucharest, 1985)
- Atelier Vagabond (Cartea Românească, Bucharest, 1994)
- A.R. Roman (Fundația Culturală Secolul 21, Bucharest, 2000)
- Peisaj cu om, proză scurtă (Fundația Culturală Secolul 21, Bucharest, 2002)
- Ziua și Noaptea (Fundația Culturală Secolul 21, Bucharest, 2004)
- Copacul din curtea vecină (Fundația Culturală Secolul 21, Bucharest 2009)

== Selected illustrations ==
- Goethe-Faust, translated by Ștefan Augustin Doinaș illustrations by Geta Brătescu, Editura Univers, 1983
- Mother Courage by Bertolt Brecht
- The Plague by Albert Camus, Revista "Secolul 20", p. 75–165, Nr.6, Annul 1964
- Layout, Concept and Review in Secolul 20/21

== Tribute ==
On May 4, 2021, Google celebrated her 95th birthday with a Google Doodle.

== Bibliography ==
- Album Geta Brătescu, Muzeul de Artă al României- secția Artă Contemporană, București, Editat de Centrul Internațional Pentru Artă Contemporană, 1999
- Geta Brătescu, Ateliere de artiști din București, Vol.al 2 lea, p. 11–15, Editura Noimediaprint;
- Catalogul Expoziției Geta Brătescu și Ion Grigorescu "Resurse", M.N.A.C., București, curator Ruxandra Balaci, Magda Radu;
- Catalogul Expoziției Geta Brătescu, Galeria Taxispalais, 2008;
- Alexandra Titu, Experimentul în arta românească după 1960, Geta Brătescu p. 8,72,101,106, Editura Meridiane, 2003;
- In search of Balkania /În căutarea Balcaniei, Geta Brătescu Neue Galeria Graz, autori:Roger Gonver, Cufer Peter, Peter Weibel;
- Octavian Barbosa, Dicționarul Artistilor Români Contemporani, București, Ed. Meridiane, 1976;
- Geta Brătescu, Dicționarul de Artă Modernă, p. 65–66 de Constantin Prut, Editura Albatros, 1982;
- Ciuma de Albert Camus, Revista "Secolul 20", p. 75–165, Nr.6, Annul 1964;
- Geta Brătescu, Catalogul Expoziției, "Economia darului", Galeria The Blade Factory Liverpool, 2010;
- Geta Brătescu, Frieze Magazine, Published on 24/09/08 By Burkhard Meltzer;
- http://www.contemporaryartdaily.com/2011/01/geta-bratescu-at-mezzanin/
- Gatalogul Expoziției "Vestigii" 1982, Geta Brătescu, Zona Maco. Mexico Arte Contemporaneo, curator Adriano Pedrosa, Centro Banamex, Hall D, Mexico City, 2011
