= Waltércio Caldas =

Brazilian sculptor, designer and graphic artist

- Born: Waltércio Caldas Júnior; 6 November 1946 (age 78); Rio de Janeiro, Brazil
- Education: Museum of Modern Art, Rio de Janeiro
- Known for: Sculptor; Designer; Graphic artist
- Movement: Neo-Concretism
- Awards: Mario Pedrosa Award; Brasília Art Award
- Website: WaltercioCaldas.com.br

Waltércio Caldas Júnior (born 6 November 1946), also known as Waltércio Caldas, is a Brazilian sculptor, designer, and graphic artist. Caldas is best known as part of Brazil's Neo-Concretism movement as well as for his eclectic choices in materials.

== Early life and education ==
Caldas was born in Rio de Janeiro, Brazil, the son of Diva Caldas (née Fialho) and Waltercio Caldas, a civil engineer. Due to his father's occupation, Caldas has stated that from a young age he was surrounded by drawings and scale models.

In the early sixties, Caldas had his first amateur exhibition showing at the Student's Council of the Philosophy Course at Rio de Janeiro State University. And in 1964, Caldas began studying under Ivan Serpa at the Museum of Modern Art, Rio de Janeiro.

== Career ==
=== Early work (1960s–1980s) ===
Caldas completed his first graphic project in 1965 and in the late 1960s first started experimenting with perception and enigmatic sculptures. In the early seventies, Caldas also started creating drawings and box object such as The Seven Stars of Silence (1970), Centre of Primitive Reason (1970), and You are Blind (1972) which drew critical acclaim including from Gilberto Chateaubriand. In 1973, Caldas exhibited his first solo show at the Museum of Modern Art, Rio de Janeiro which he was widely commended for. Writer, Ronaldo Brito wrote about the exhibition and commented that Caldas' work encouraged the viewer to not just look at the art, but contemplate it as well as it evoked a moment of "psychic bewilderment" in the viewer. Also at this time, Caldas edited Malasartes, a short-lived magazine that became a landmark in the Brazilian artistic scene and taught "Art and Visual Perception" at the Villa-Lobos Institute.

In the 1980s, Caldas started to create more facilities in his work. Caldas moved to New York in 1985 where he experimented with non-transparent sculpture material. Caldas then returned to Brazil the following year where he showed two shows simultaneously in both Rio de Janeiro and São Paulo that paralleled each other and emphasized the idea of "double intrinsic." In 1989, Caldas installed its first public sculpture: The Instant Garden in Carmo Park, São Paulo.

=== Later work (1990s–present) ===
In 1990, Caldas exhibited his first solo show in Europe, drawings at the Pulitzer Gallery in Amsterdam. Caldas then completed his second public commission sculpture, Omkring (Around), in 1994, which is now on permanent display in Leirfjord, Norway. The sculpture was classified as "line articulation" and commended for countering lightness with tension.

== Recognition ==
In 1990, Caldas was awarded the Brasília Art Award at the Brasília Museum of Art which also led to the museum incorporating pieces from Caldas into its collection. In 1993, Caldas' solo show, The Finest Air, was exhibited at the Fine Arts National Museum in Rio de Janeiro, which was awarded the Mario Pedrosa Award and named the Best Show of the Year in Brazil by the Brazilian Art Critics’ Association. In 1998, Caldas was named a Johnnie Walker Award recipient and presented a sculpture to be permanently displayed at the Museu de Arte Moderna da Bahia.

== Personal life ==
Caldas is married to Patricia Vasconcellos and currently lives and works in Rio de Janeiro, Brazil.

== Exhibitions ==
Caldas has had solo exhibitions across North America, South American, and Europe. Notably, he has had exhibitions at the Museum of Modern Art in Rio de Janeiro, the Kanaal Foundation in Belgium, the Stedelijk Museum in Amsterdam, the Christopher Grimes Gallery in Santa Monica, the Quintana Gallery in Miami, the Galeria Javier López of Madrid, the Centre d’Art Contemporain Genève among other international venues.

Caldas has also been widely exhibited in his native Brazil including at the Museu Nacional de Belas Artes, and the Centro Cultural da Light, in Rio de Janeiro, the Museu de Arte Moderna da Bahia, in Salvador, and at the São Paulo Museum of Modern Art. Caldas also participated in the Venice Biennale in 1997 and 2007, as well as in multiple São Paulo and Mercosul Biennials in Brazil.

== Collections ==
Caldas' work can be found in numerous public and private collections worldwide, some of which include:

- The Museum of Modern Art, New York
- Walker Art Center, Minneapolis
- The National Gallery of Art, Washington DC
- Sao Paulo Museum of Modern Art
- The Blanton Museum of Art, Austin

== Selected works ==
- Espelho com luz (Mirror with Light), 1975

== Works and publications ==
- Caldas Júnior, Waltércio; Kuijken, Ilse; Filho, Paulo Venancio; Salzstein, Sônia (1992). Waltercio Caldas. Brazil: Armazens Gerais Columbia. OCLC 41995418. – Published on the occasion of the 'Documenta 9', Kassel
- Caldas Júnior, Waltércio; Sergio Duarte, Paulo (2001). Waltercio Caldas (in Portuguese and English). São Paulo: Cosac & Naify. ISBN 978-8-586-37470-8. OCLC 50676238.
- Caldas Júnior, Waltércio (2001). Waltercio Caldas: 1985-2000 (in Portuguese and English). Rio de Janeiro: Centro Cultural Banco do Brasil. OCLC 57434616. – Exhibition catalog of the exposition Waltercio Caldas: 1985–2000, held at Centro Cultural Banco do Brasil, 15 May – 29 July 2001 in Rio de Janeiro, and, 10 Aug. – 16 Sept. 2001 in Brasília
- Caldas Júnior, Waltércio; Gabinete de Arte Raquel Arnaud (2001). Waltercio Caldas. São Paulo: Gabinete de Arte Raquel Arnaud. OCLC 501006327. – catalogue of an exhibition held at Gabinete de Arte Raquel Arnaud (São Paulo), August 2003
- Caldas Júnior, Waltércio; Pedro da Silva, Fernando; Andrés Ribeiro, Marília (2006). Waltercio Caldas: O Atelier Transparente (Circuito atelier, 36 ed.). Belo Horizonte: Editora C/Arte. ISBN 978-8-576-54042-7. OCLC 166522813.
- Caldas Júnior, Waltércio; Pérez-Barreiro, Gabriel; Shiff, Richard; Storr, Robert; Rodríguez, Mari Tere; Blanton Museum of Art (2013). Waltercio Caldas. Austin, TX: University of Texas Press. ISBN 978-0-292-75311-2. OCLC 819741974. – Published in conjunction with the exhibition "The Nearest Air: A survey of works by Waltercio Caldas" (27 October 2013 – 12 January 2014)
- Caldas Júnior, Waltércio; Jiménez, Ariel; Brett, Guy; Fundación Cisneros (2016). Waltercio Caldas in conversation with Ariel Jiménez = Waltercio Caldas en conversación con Ariel Jiménez (in English and Spanish). New York: Colección Patricia Phelps de Cisneros. ISBN 978-0-988-20559-8. OCLC 948878970.
