= David Lamelas =

Argentine artist

David Lamelas (born 1946, Buenos Aires) is an Argentine artist. A pioneer of Conceptual art, he was involved in Argentina's avant-garde scene in the 1960s. Well known for his sculptures and films, Lamelas lives and works between Los Angeles, Buenos Aires, and Europe.

== Education and early career ==
Lamelas graduated from the Academia Nacional de Bellas Artes in 1963. Early in his career he focused on sculpture and participated in exhibits in Buenos Aires. During the 1960s, he was one of the key members of the Instituto Torcuatro di Tella, an organization that promoted avant-garde and conceptual art. The contemporary art movement in Argentina met opposition from the government starting in June 1966 when President Arturo Umberto Illia was deposed. Newly appointed President Juan Carlos Onganía, a right-wing conservative, used the Argentine Armed Forces to suppress political opposition coming from universities and the youth. The government also began policing outspoken artists. By his own account, David Lamelas had been arrested and jailed four times by 1968.

In 1967, Lamelas exhibited at the 9th São Paulo Biennial. His installation, Dos Espacios Modificados – Two Modified Spaces, won top prize. Later the same year, his installation Situacion de Tiempo – Time Situation was on display in Buenos Aires.

In 1968 he left Argentina to study sculpture at Saint Martin's School of Art in London. Also in 1968, Lamelas was invited to represent Argentina in the 1968 Venice Biennial. His installation, The Office of Information about the Vietnam War at Three Levels: The Visual Image, Text and Audio, is representative of many of Lamelas' themes including media, communication, information, and critique of United States foreign policy.

Lamelas' interest in film began during his studies in London. Among his best-known films are "Film Script", "To Pour Milk Into a Glass", and "The Dictator". His films contain themes of time, space, surveillance, and popular culture.

== Awards ==
In 1992, Lamelas received the Diploma al Mérito at the Konex Foundation Awards for Conceptual Art and in 2012, the same award for Video Art.

In 1993, he received a Guggenheim Fellowship for Fine Arts and in 1998, the DAAD Stipendium from Germany.

== Selected exhibitions ==
Exhibition	Year	Location
Documenta 5	1972	Kassell
1965-1975: Reconsidering the Object of Art	1995	MoCA, Los Angeles
Above the Fold	2008	Kunstmuseum, Basel
The Death of the Audience	2009	Secession, Vienna
The Quick and the Dead	2009	Walker Arts Center, Minneapolis
How Many Billboards	2010	Los Angeles
Transmissions: Art in Eastern Europe and Latin America, 1960–1980	2015	MoMA
Fiction of a Production	2018	MSU Broad

Solo Exhibitions

- A New Refutation of Time, 1997, Witte de With Center for Contemporary Art
- David Lamelas, Extranjero, Foreigner, Étranger, Ausländer, 2005. Museo Tamayo. Mexico City
- David Lamelas, 2006, Secession, Vienna
- David Lamelas: The Machine, 2026-2027, Dia Chelsea, New York City
