= Cildo Meireles =

Brazilian artist

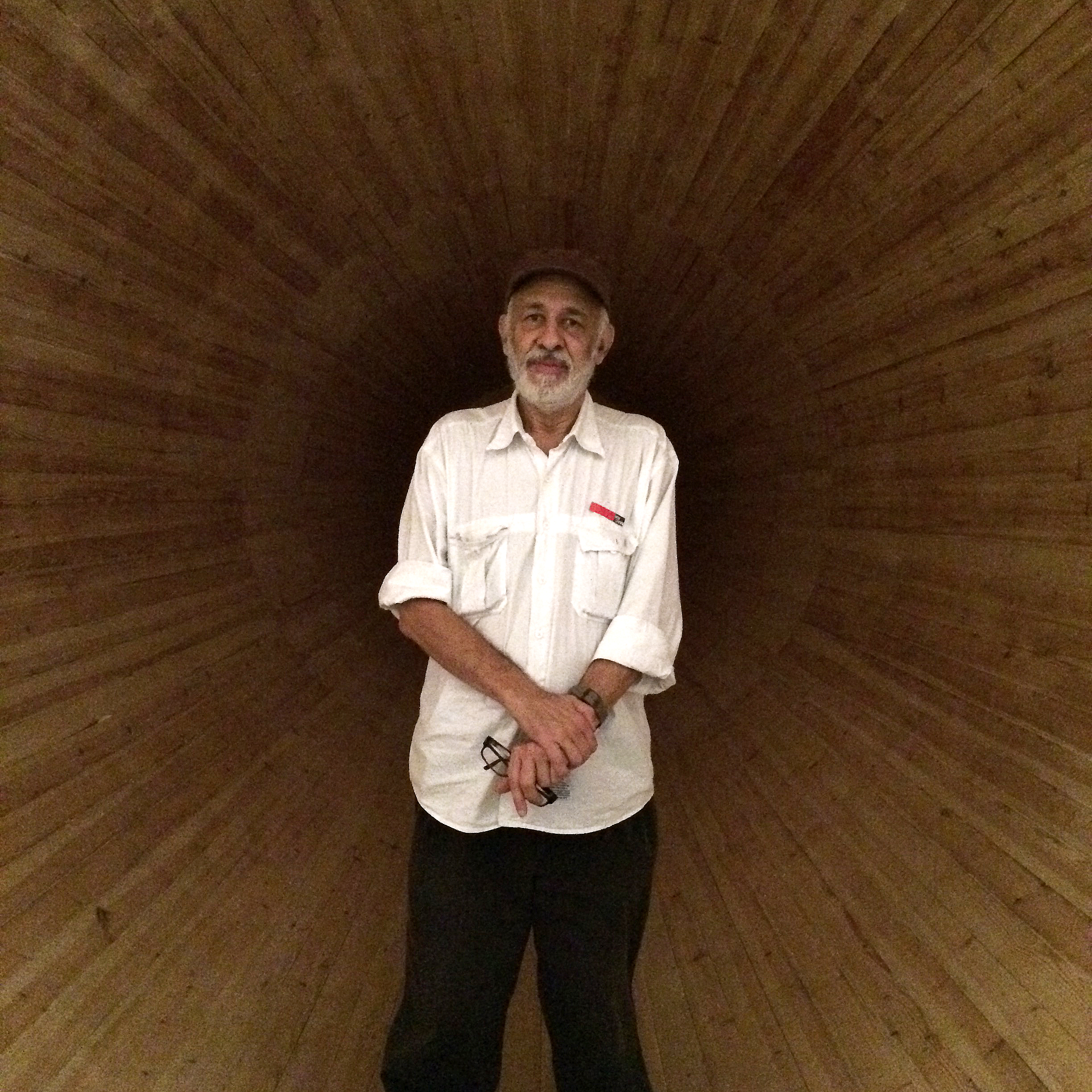
- Cildo Meireles at MACBA
- Born: 1948; Rio de Janeiro, Brazil
- Known for: Sculpture and installation
- Movement: Concrete art, Conceptual art, Neo-concrete art
- Awards: Prince Claus Award, 1999

Cildo Meireles (born 1948) is a Brazilian conceptual artist, installation artist and sculptor. He is noted especially for his installations, many of which express resistance to political oppression in Brazil. These works, often large and dense, encourage a phenomenological experience via the viewer's interaction.

== Life ==
Meireles was born in Rio de Janeiro in 1948. From an early age, Meireles showed a keen interest in drawing and spatial relations. He was especially interested in how this has been explored in animated film. His father, who encouraged Meireles' creativity, worked for the Indian Protection Service and their family traveled extensively within rural Brazil.

In an interview with Nuria Enguita, Meireles described a time when he was "seven or eight" and living in the countryside that had a huge impact on him. He said that he was startled by an impoverished man wandering through the trees. The next day, the young Meireles went to investigate, but the man was gone and only a small but perfect hut the man had apparently made the night before remained. Meireles said that this hut "was perhaps the most decisive thing for the path [he] followed in life...The possibility one has of making things and leaving them for others."

During his time in rural Brazil, Meireles learned the beliefs of the Tupi people which he later incorporated into some of his works in order to highlight their marginalization in, or complete disappearance from, Brazilian society and politics. Installations which contain allusions to the Tupi include Southern Cross (1969–70) and Olvido (1990). Meireles cites Orson Welles' 1938 radio broadcast The War of the Worlds as one of the greatest works of art of the 20th century because it "seamlessly dissolved the border between art and life, fiction and reality." Recreating this concept of total audience investment was an important artistic goal of Meireles that is seen throughout his body of work.

He began his study of art in 1963 at the District Federal Cultural Foundation in Brasília, under the Peruvian painter and ceramist Felix Barrenechea. In the late 1960s, Meireles discovered the work of Hélio Oiticica and Lygia Clark, thereby introducing him to the Brazilian Neo-Concrete movement. These artists, as well as Meireles, were all concerned with blurring the boundary between what is art and what is life, and responding to current political situations within their pieces.

Meireles unintentionally participated in a political demonstration in April 1964, when he was sixteen years old. He has cited this moment has his "political awakening" and began to take an interest in student politics. In 1967 he moved to Rio de Janeiro and studied at the Escola Nacional de Belas Artes.

Meireles currently lives and works in Rio de Janeiro.

== Career ==
Meireles has stated that drawing was his main artistic medium until 1968, when he altogether abandoned expressionistic drawing in favor of designing things that he wanted to physically construct. A topic that he especially explored in his art was the concept of the ephemeral and the non-object, art that only exists with interaction, which prompted him to create installation pieces or situational art. This led to his Virtual Spaces project, which he began in 1968. This project was "based on Euclidian principles of space" and sought to show how objects in space can be defined by three different planes. He modeled this concept as a series of environments made to look like corners in rooms.

Following the military coup in 1964, Meireles became involved in political art. When Meireles was "first getting started as an artist," governmental censorship of various forms of media, including art, was standard in Brazil. Meireles found ways to create art that was subversive but subtle enough to make public by taking inspiration from Dadaist art, which he notes had the ability to seem "tame" and "ironic." In the early 1970s he developed a political art project that aimed to reach a wide audience while avoiding censorship called Insertions Into Ideological Circuits, which was continued until 1976. Many of his installation pieces since this time have taken on political themes, though now his art is "less overtly political."

He was one of the founders of the Experimental Unit of the Museu de Arte Moderna in Rio de Janeiro in 1969 and in 1975, edited the art magazine Malasartes.

In 1999, Meireles was honoured with a Prince Claus Award and in 2008 he won the Velazquez Plastic Arts Award, presented by the Ministry of Culture of Spain.

== Key works ==
=== Red Shift (1967–1984) ===
A large-scale, three-room exploration of an entirely red environment. The title of the installation refers both to the scientific concept of chromatic shift (or chromatic aberration) as well as to the idea of a "shift" as a displacement or deviation.

The first room, called Impregnation, is approximately 50 m^{2} and filled with a number of everyday, domestic objects in a variety of different shades of red. The effect is an overwhelming visual saturation of the color. Upon entering the room, the participant experiences an initial shock from the visual inundation of red. Dan Cameron writes that "one's gaze is literally thwarted in an effort to gain a purchase on the specificity of things." Because of its lack of chromatic differentiation, the environment appears to lack depth. Cameron argues that the longer a participant stays in the room the more aware they become of the color's negative, unsettling psychological impact on them.

The second room is called Spill/Environment and consists solely of a large pool of red ink spilled from a small bottle on the floor, evoking mental associations with blood. The amount of liquid on the floor in comparison to the amount which the bottle could conceivably hold is disproportionate. The redness on the floor extends throughout the small room to the edge of the darkened third room, an effect which lends itself to feelings of foreboding and uncertainty.

The third room, Shift, contains a washbasin attached to the wall at a 30° angle illuminated by a direct beam of overhead light. A red stream pours into the washbasin from a tap, also at a 30° angle, allowing the liquid to pool in the sink before draining. The feelings of disturbance experienced by the participant throughout the installation culminate in this final room. Since the room is completely dark, the sole focus is placed on the washbasin. While the connotations of blood which appear throughout the installation are at first rather vague, like in the initial saturation of red in the first room and in the ink spill of the second room, in the third room this association with blood becomes much more explicit, creating a final, visceral reaction to the color within the participant.

Art historian Anne Dezeuze has commented that the "cinematic" installation as a whole articulates a certain sense of menace within participants because of the intense repetition of the color red throughout the three rooms. Like most of Meireles' other artworks, Red Shift takes on political undertones when examined in light of Brazil's military dictatorship which lasted throughout the creation and exhibition of this piece. For instance, the red liquid pouring into the washbasin has been seen by some art historians as a visual representation of the blood of victims murdered by government authorities.

=== Southern Cross (1969–1970) ===
A minimalist sculpture, on a Lilliputian scale: Meireles calls it an example of “humiliminimalism” – a humble brand of minimalism. He wanted it to be even smaller, “but when [he] sanded it down to [his] nails, [he] lost patience and stopped at nine millimeters." Unlike most minimalist sculptures it is no mere object, but it is meant to be as richly symbolic, sensuous and potent as an amulet. Each half of the tiny 9mm by 9mm by 9mm cube is made of pine and oak. These two types of wood are considered sacred by the Tupi people of Brazil. The title refers to an unofficial geographical (and metaphysical) region that lies to the west of Tordesillas. According to Meireles in a statement he made about the artwork in 1970, this region is "the wild side, the jungle in one's head, without the lustre of intelligence or reason...our origins." It is a place where "there are only individual truths." In the same statement, he notes that he wants Southern Cross to be perceived as a physical representation of the memory of the Tupi ("people whose history is legends and fables") and a warning to modernity of the growing self-confidence of the primordial which will eventually result in an overtaking of the urban by the natural. Meireles' statement is also political. It is a caution against indifference, especially against indifference towards Brazil's fading indigenous population. The tiny cube is meant to be placed alone in the middle of an empty room in order to emphasize the reality and the power of indigenous belief systems in the context of Eurocentric modernism.

=== Insertions Into Ideological Circuits (1970–1976) ===
An art project with political undertones that was designed to reach a mass-audience. This project manifested in multiple ways, two of the most well-known being the Coca-Cola project, and the Banknote project. Insertions Into Ideological Circuits was based upon three principles as defined by Meireles: 1) In society there are certain mechanisms for circulation (circuits); 2) these circuits clearly embody the ideology of the producer, but at the same time they are passive when they receive insertions into the circuit; 3) and this occurs whenever people initiate them. The goal of Insertions... was to literally insert some kind of counter-information or critical thought into a large system of circulated information. Meireles inserted something that is physically the same, though ideologically different, into a pre-existing system in order to counteract the original circuit without disrupting it. The project was achieved by printing images and messages onto various items that were already widely circulated and which had value discouraging them being destroyed, such as Coca-Cola bottles (which were recycled by way of a deposit scheme) and banknotes. Meireles screen-printed texts onto the Coca-Cola bottles that were supposed to encourage the buyer to become aware of their personal role in a consumerist society. The project simultaneously conveyed anti-imperialist and anti-capitalist messages. Building off of that concept, Meireles also used money as a theme and produced his own replica banknotes and coins (1974–1978) which appeared very similar to genuine Brazilian and US currency but with zero denominations clearly written on them, e.g. Zero Dollar. Mieireles also wrote critiques of the Brazilian government on the banknotes, such as "Who killed Herzog?" (in reference to journalist Vladimir Herzog), "Yankees go home!" and "Direct elections."

=== Through (1983–1989) ===
A labyrinthine structure which invites the visitor to walk across eight tons of broken plate glass. The maze is composed of "velvet museum ropes, street barriers, garden fences, blinds, railings, and aquariums" and in the center of it is a three-meter ball of cellophane. Meireles notes that an essential part of Through is the sense of psychological unease that comes from the participant's realization of the different sensory capacities and capabilities between the eyes and the body. For instance, the eyes can see through the glass parts of the work, but the body is physically impeded from passing through parts of the space. Furthermore, the sound of crunching glass underfoot while navigating the maze can be off-putting. He wanted the participant to experience psychological tension between the appreciation of the sonic and the appreciation of the visual. The work, Meireles says, "is based on the notion of an excess of obstacles and prohibitions." Meireles drew some of his inspiration for this installation from writer Jorge Luis Borges, whose subject matter sometimes included the concept of the labyrinth. Meireles also wanted the participant to experience feelings of awareness and attentiveness that come from walking a labyrinth.

=== Olvido (1987-1989) ===
"Olvido" is a large-scale installation. The materials used were unique. Those materials include banknotes, animal bones, and candles. The audience is able to experience with both materials and senses, visual, hearing, and smell. The materials used in the installation were metaphors of political and social issues. The artwork is an indication of the environmental disaster caused by the development and deforestation in the Amazon region and the damage to the Indigenous communities.

=== Babel (2001) ===
A tower of hundreds of radios, each just audible and tuned to stations of different languages to evoke resonances of the Tower of Babel in the Bible. In the story, before the destruction of the Tower of Babel by God, every person on Earth spoke the same language. Meireles' Babel acknowledges the multiplicity of language that resulted from the Tower's destruction in the story. The artwork contradicts the notion of one universal language, emphasizing that the pursuit of commonality is futile. Paul Herkenhoff points out that Babel also has autobiographical meaning for Meireles, as radio was a common method of widespread communication in Brazil during the artist's youth. The work also speaks to globalization. Meireles parallels the unity of humanity before the fall of the Tower of Babel with the present-day unity which has resulted from globalization despite numerous language barriers.

== Exhibitions ==
Meireles considers his first exhibition to have taken place in 1965, when one of his canvases and two of his drawings were accepted by the Segundo Salão Nacional de Arte Moderna in Brasília.

A retrospective of his work was presented at the New Museum of Contemporary Art in New York in 1999. It then traveled to the Museu de Arte Moderna in Rio de Janeiro and the São Paulo Museum of Modern Art. In conjunction with the exhibition, a book entitled Cildo Meireles, was published by Phaidon Press (1999).

The first extensive presentation of the artist's work in the UK opened at Tate Modern in October 2008. Meireles was the first Brazilian artist to be given a full retrospective by Tate. This exhibition then moved to the Museu d'Art Contemporani in Barcelona, and later to the Museo Universitario Arte Contemporáneo (MUAC) in Mexico City until January 10, 2010.

From March to July 2014 a major retrospective of Meireles's work was presented at Milan's HangarBicocca. It featured twelve of his most important works. Another important retrospective took place at SESC Pompeia from September 2019 to February 2020. In the exhibition entitled "Entrevendo" (Glimpsing) many of his most noteworthy installations were on display and an important catalogue was created for the exhibition.

In 2026, his work was featured in This Is America: Selections from PAMM's Collection, at the Pérez Art Museum Miami, Florida. Meireles's work was included alongside works by Coco Fusco and Alfredo Jaar, among others.

== Selected bibliography ==
- Basualdo, Carlos. "Maxima Moralia: The Work of C. Meireles", Artforum International, v. 35 (February 1997) p. 58-63.
- Cameron, Dan, Paulo Herkenhoff, and Gerardo Mosquera. Cildo Meireles. London: Phaidon Press, 1999.
- Carvalho, Denise. "Cildo Meireles: New Museum of Contemporary Art" Sculpture, v. 19 no. 10 (December 2000) p. 74-5.
- Cohen, Ana Paula. "Cildo Meireles: Museu de Arte Moderna Aloisio Magalhaes", Art Nexus no. 44 (April/June 2002) p. 125-6.
- Dezeuze, Anna. "Cildo Meireles." Artforum International 47, no. 8 (2009): 182.
- Farmer, John Alan. "Through the Labyrinth: An Interview with Cildo Meireles", Art Journal v. 59 no. 3 (Fall 2000) p. 34-43.
- Gilmore, Jonathan. "Cildo Meireles at Galerie Lelong", Art in America v. 93 no. 3 (March 2005) p. 132.
- Meireles, Cildo. Cildo Meireles. Valencia: IVAM, 1995.
- Meireles, Cildo and Charles Merewether. “Memory of the Senses.” Grand Street, no. 64 (1998): 221–223.
- Mosquera, Gerardo. Cildo Meireles (London: Phaidon), 1999.
- Nogueira, Marcelo. “Disculpture: Cildo Meireles’s Vinyl Records as Sculptural Objects.” Journal of Latin American Cultural Studies, vol. 34, issue n. 2, (2025): 295–316. doi:10.1080/13569325.2025.2498957.
- Weinstein, Joel. "Industrial Poetry: A Conversation with Cildo Meireles", Sculpture v. 22 no. 10 (December 2003) p. 50-5.
- Zamudio, Raul. "Cildo Meireles at Tate Modern", ArtNexus v. 8. no. 73 (June/August, 2009) p. 76-78.
- Zamudio, Raul. "Knowing Can Be Destroying", TRANS> arts.cultures.media no. 7 (2000) p. 146-152.
