= Lili Dujourie =

Flemish visual artist

Lili Dujourie (born 1941 in Roeselare, Belgium) is a Flemish visual artist who works primarily in sculptures, paintings, and video. She has had numerous solo and group exhibitions since 1968 and continues to make art today.

== Career ==
The media in which Dujourie works include clay, collage paper, iron, lead, marble, photo, plaster, velvet and video. She personifies the sexuality within her materials, displaying the performative dimension of the artwork. She focuses on what her work is doing externally, rather than simplifying it, giving the ornamental elements of her work a central role. Her subjects center around time, the change between the figurative and the abstract, the sensation of gloominess and searching for an emotional aspect of space.

== Nature's Lore ==
Dujourie's work was exhibited in the Museo Nacional Centro de Arte Reina Sofía from June to September in 2011. In this exhibit, Nature's Lore, the works are all from different points in her career which are amplified by the historical dialogue of each piece. The exhibit is more of a simulation rather than a representation because of its theatrical nature. This exhibit is divided into two parts:

- Series One: Initialen der stilte, is composed of clay objects placed on thin tabletops in the forms of bones, leaves, and roots.
- Series Two: Composed of small papier-mâché sculptures influenced by the flowers grown in Europe for medicinal purposes.

== Video ==
Dujourie began to work in video in the 1960s, as an affordable and accessible medium. Her work in painting and sculpture influenced the composition and conceptual framework of the videos she produced. Working with her body, recording herself mostly in the nude, she made feminist statements on the representation of women. In most of her videos, Dujourie filmed herself, alone in a room in a single take. The videos were not edited; they existed as a form of performance documentation. She explored and combatted the male gaze by working as the viewed and the viewer, constantly making recordings to find the perfect forms and movement. Listed are her documented video works:

- Koraal, 1972
- Hommage à...II, 1972
- Hommage à...III, 1972
- Passion, 1972
- Sanguine, 1972
- Une tache, 1972
- Sonnet, 1972

== Exhibitions and installations ==
Solo Exhibitions:

- S.M.A.K., Ghent, Folds in Time, 2015
- Galerie DAAD, Berlin, 1991
- Galerie Michael Janssen, 2011
- Iron, plaster and wood, Museo Nacional Centro de Arte Reina Sofía, Spain, 1992
- Centro Andaluz de Arte Comptemporaneo, 2004
- Centre for Fine Arts, Brussels, 2005
- Clay Works, Galerie Erna Hecey, Brussel, 2007
- Nature's Lore, Museo Nacional Centro de Arte Reina Sofía, 2011
