= Phil Coy =

British artist

Philip Coy (born 1971) is a British contemporary artist known for his films and sound works exploring architectures and language. He works across a range of media including sculpture, film, video installation, sound installation, photography, text, and performance.

== Life and work ==
Born in Gloucester, England, he grew up in the Forest of Dean, Birmingham and Norfolk. He studied Fine Art at Liverpool College of Art (1993), fr:École des beaux-arts de Nantes - Saint-Nazaire (1995) and Slade School of Fine Art (2000).

His early internet sourced video "Eleven Seconds of Paradise" (2000) was made prior to the launch of Google images using AltaVista and included in the Hayward Gallery touring exhibition Incommunicado(2003-4) and Dan Graham's Waterloo Sunset Pavilion, Hayward Gallery (2002-2003). Incommunicado's curator Margot Heller described Eleven seconds of paradise as

"a succinct comment on the negative impact of communication technologies, and as such its efficacy and relevance have increased in the short space of time since it was made."

Coy used Earth observation data from satellites as source material in 2000 prior to the launch of Google Earth (2004) when satellite navigation became the ubiquitous cultural phenomenon it is today. His 'pixel replacements' such as A walk in the park (2000), Trinidad Triptych [Red square] (2004) and Black spot (2005), reproduced pixels from satellite images to scale, and installed and photographed them in the place they represented on the earth. The works combined techniques of digital imaging, minimalism and land art to produce a form of augmented reality. In 2016 Coy became the second Leverhulme artist-in-residence at the Rutherford Appleton Space Laboratory following Elizabeth Price. He researched the processes and materials behind digital satellite imaging to produce the fulldome film and virtual reality installation Substance toured to FACT Liverpool (2017), The Royal Observatory Planetarium, South London Gallery (2018), York Art Gallery.

The newsreader and reporter Julia Somerville starred in his film Façade (2010), which casts London's glass architecture as a transparent subject rendered slowly opaque by the language it engenders. Façade (2010) and Wordland (2008) are held in the BFI Artists Moving Image Collection.

He was the inaugural artist in residence at Brunel University (2018–19) where he devised the imprint youarehere! with author and academic Will Self. The project is explored in the essay amidst the susurration of motorways by artist/writer/curator Richard Grayson.

== Filmography ==
- Organ (2026)
- Sixty Beats (2025)
- Grit (2024)
- Islands (2023)
- Substance (2018)
- Avoiding Green (2017)
- Who goes there? (2016)
- as far as i know [afaik] (2015)
- Sons of unless and children of almost (2014)
- Krapp's Shultz (2012)
- Façade (2010)
- Wordland (2008)
- Omega (2004)
- Eleven Seconds of Paradise (2000)(2010)(2020)
- Sound Mirror (1999)
- Notes from the waterfall (1999)

== Public works ==
Sixty beats per minute (2025) commissioned by Arts + Christianity, sound installation, featured dub mix by Adrian Sherwood.

Swete Brethe (2021) commissioned by Matt's Gallery, temporary installation adjacent to Embassy of the United States of America in London, featuring composition by Byron Wallen.

Stereo Pair (2021) commissioned by Brunel University London, permanent site-sensitive sound installation, John Crank Gardens in Brunel University.

Your right to continued existence (2016) Islington North, commissioned by TFL and Islington Council, installed under the 'Cally Bridge' on the Caledonian Road, London, adjacent to the London Overground, Caledonian Road & Barnsbury railway station.

Razzle Dazzle Boogie Woogie (2013) Permanent public realm commission installed opposite Lewisham station, visible from mainline railway between Kent, East Sussex and London Bridge. A curved architectural facade of backlit coloured glass panels create a digital camouflage over the facade of Lewisham's Glass Mill leisure Centre. At night the kinetic work is animated by the sounds of Lewisham.
