= Robin Klassnik =

Robin Klassnik OBE
- Born: Andre Robin Klassnik; 28 January 1947 (age 79); Johannesburg, Union of South Africa
- Citizenship: British (from 1963)
- Education: Hornsey College of Art, 1965; Leicester College of Art, 1968
- Occupations: Artist; gallerist; educator
- Organisation: Matt's Gallery
- Spouse: Kathryn Halton (m. 1979)
- Awards: OBE, 2014

Andre Robin Klassnik OBE (born 28 January 1947) is a South African-born British artist, gallerist and educator, known for founding Matt's Gallery.

== Early life and education ==
Klassnik was born Andre Robin Klassnik on 28 January 1947 in Johannesburg, Union of South Africa (present-day South Africa) to an exiled Lithuanian-Jewish family. Settling in London in 1960, Klassnik later studied at the Hornsey College of Art from 1963 to 1965. During 1965 to 1968, Klassnik studied at Leicester College of Art.

== Career ==
Following graduation Klassnik returned to London where he took up a Space studio at St Katharine Docks. During this time, Klassnik’s practice moved from painting to sculpture, 8mm film and photography. Klassnik’s work has been exhibited nationally and internationally at venues including the ICA, Whitechapel Art Gallery, and the Paris Biennale. Notable projects of Klassnik’s include his collaboration Five Pheromones: The Incomplete Documentation with Forensic Psychiatrist Dr. Tom Clark.

In 1971, Klassnik moved studios to Martello Street, London Fields, where he opened Matt's Gallery, in 1979. Now located at Webster Road, Matt's Gallery has been described as ‘the most heroic art space in London’ and 'a little utopia'. The gallery represents twenty five artists, including Susan Hiller; Imogen Stidworthy, Nathaniel Mellors, Willie Doherty and Mike Nelson.

=== Teaching ===
Klassnik has taught at a variety of institutions throughout his career including at the London College of Printing; Goldsmiths; Camberwell College of Arts; Chelsea College of Arts; the Royal College of Art; Slade School of Fine Art; University of Brighton; Northumbria University; University of Reading; Newcastle University; Ruskin School of Drawing and Fine Art; Valands Konsthogskola, Sweden; and Statens Kunstakademi, Oslo. He was also a visiting professor at Central Saint Martins School of Art and Head of Complementary Studies at Byam Shaw School of Art.

== Awards ==
In 1986, Klassnik was commended by the Turner Prize for his contributions to contemporary art. In 1994, Klassnik was shortlisted for the Prudential/Arts Council Award for an individual contribution to innovation and creativity in the arts. In 2014, Klassnik was awarded an OBE for services to the visual arts.

== Personal life ==
Klassnik obtained British citizen in 1963. In 1979, Klassnik married Kathryn Halton.
