= Jone Kvie =

Norwegian-Swedish contemporary artist

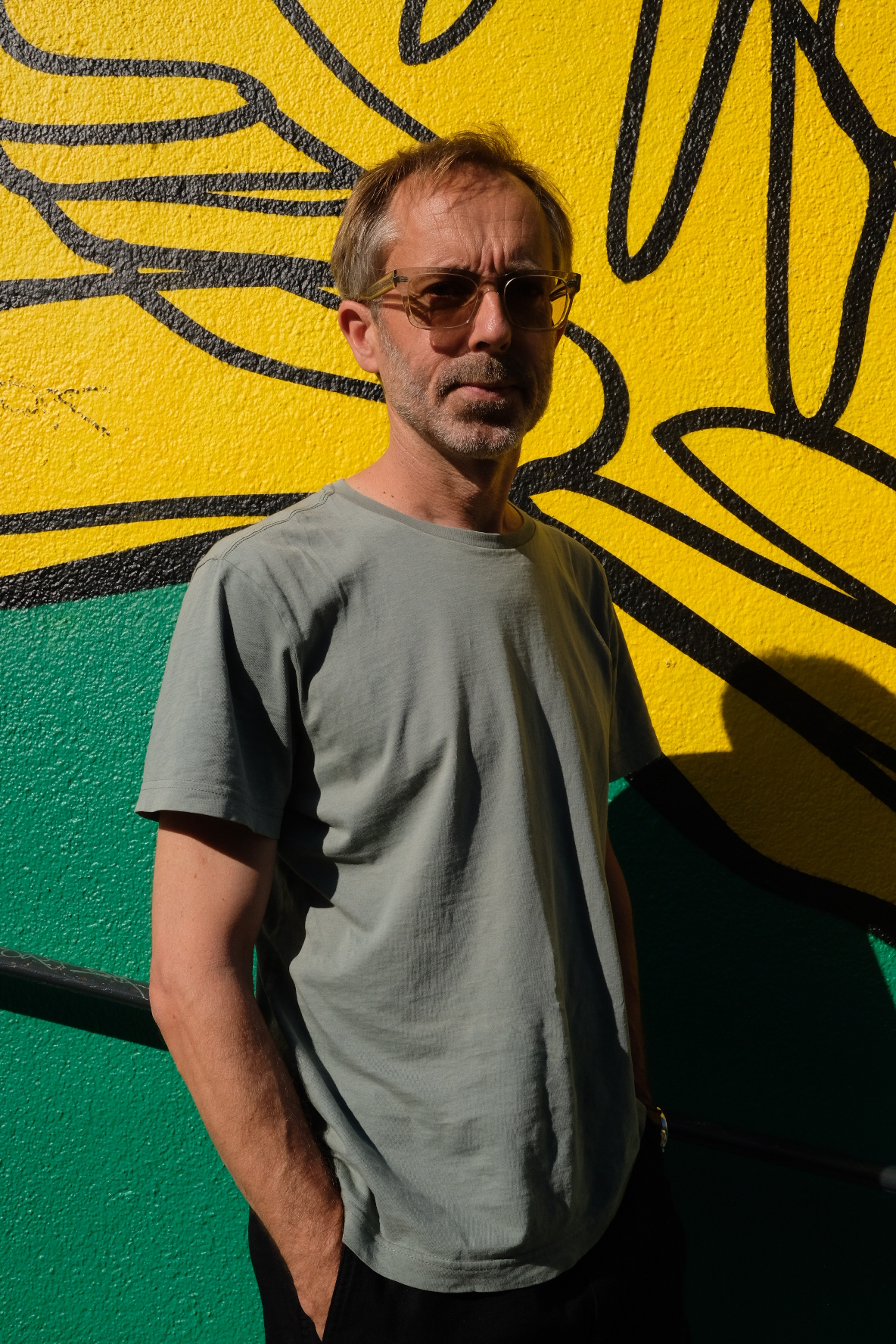
- Born: 1971 (age 54–55)
- Education: Academy of Fine Arts & Vestlandets Art Academy, Norway

Jone Kvie (born 1971) is a Norwegian-Swedish contemporary artist whose sculptural practice explores the intersection of art and science. Embracing interdisciplinary ideas, Kvie incorporates scientific and philosophical knowledge in sculpture to reveal connections between the material world, the body, and the environment. For his 2022 participation in documenta, Kvie created a site-specific installation at Kassel Hauptbahnhof featuring volcanic tuff rock adorned with lichens, moss, and pine needles, borrowed from the local quarry, as part of the artist collective Jimmie Durham & A Stick in the Forest by the Side of the Road curated by ruangrupa.

In the same year, his duo exhibition Paired Weight: Jimmie Durham and Jone Kvie opened at OSL Contemporary in Oslo, along with his solo exhibition what comes after certainty at Örebro Konsthall. In 2019, Kvie opened his most extensive retrospective solo exhibition to date Here, here at Stavanger Art Museum. In 2018, his solo exhibition, Metamorphosis, opened at the Gothenburg Museum of Art, and in 2017, his solo exhibition, Vessels, opened at the Vigeland Museum.

== Public collections and commissions ==
The Public Art Agency Sweden selected Jone Kvie to realise a public art commission for Campus Solna in Stockholm, to be inaugurated in 2027. Kvie has worked on several private and public commissions: Krigsseilerplassen (Memorial for Norwegian Sailors of 1st and 2nd WW in Stavanger) (2024), Norwegian Film Institute, Cinemateket in Oslo (2023), Nybygg Psykisk Helse at Kristiansand Hospital (2023), Østfold Hospital in Oslo (2017), Molde Konsethus in Norway (2012), Tromstun School, for KORO Public Art Norway (2011), “Norske Turistveier” - Proposal for picnic areas, Norway. Winner of first prize, Oslo Prison for Public Art Norway (2009), University of Umeå for The National Public Arts Council (2008), Hitec headquarters in Stavanger (2007), Stortinget (The Norwegian Parliament) (2004), Brødrene Kverneland (2004), Telenor Headquarter in Oslo (2003) and Stavanger Aftenblad (1999).

Among public collections holding his work are ARoS, National Museum of Norway, American University Museum, Gothenburg Museum of Art, Malmö Art Museum, Stavanger Art Museum, KODE, The Norwegian Parliament, Region Skåne, and Wanås.

Galleries in Denmark (Nils Stærk), Norway (OSL Contemporary and Galleri Opdahl) and Sweden (Elastic Gallery) represent Jone Kvie.

== Early life and education ==
Kvie lives and works in Naples, Italy and Stavanger, Norway. He was born in Stavanger in Norway, in 1971 and graduated from the Oslo National Academy of the Arts (1995-1997) and Bergen Academy of Art and Design (1993-1995). He made his debut in Sweden at the group exhibition 22 artists from Oslo at Gothenburg Museum of Art in 1997. After relocating to Malmö in 1999, Kvie became part of the established Swedish art scene, exhibiting widely across Scandinavia and internationally.

In the mid-90s, Kvie opened the gallery Otto Plonk in Bergen together with artists Per Gunnar Eeg-Tverbakk and Snorre Ytterstad, which made an important contribution to the development of the emerging contemporary art scene at that time and represents a significant chapter in Norwegian art history today.

== Work and themes ==
Kvie has worked with sculpture and installation art since the 1990s. In his sculptures, he utilises various materials, including natural stone, bronze, aluminium, and glass. Working from the basis of photography that stems from his own collection, as well as scientific and popular cultural documentation photos collected from the internet, Kvie's sculptures translate both natural and man-made phenomena, in effect transforming the exhibition space itself.

=== Astronomy ===
Kvie's work precludes the possibility of direct experience with extraordinary natural phenomena, such as star formations, nebulae, and meteors. In his ongoing body of work, Meteor (2001—), Kvie exemplifies his eye for how natural objects translate into abstract sculpture. Based on visual impressions drawn from research, Kvie filters advanced scientific knowledge and philosophical contemplation through the lens of sculptural language. Through colouring and patination, Kvie negotiates natural phenomena in outer space by reducing them to a human scale, thereby making them more accessible. In earlier series, such as Star Tower (2008-12) and Sculpted Gas (2009-2012), Kvie exhibited his hand-modelled works on custom-made plinths, mirroring the presentation of scientific study objects. Some of his most recognised works from the 90s include Untitled from 2002, a two-metre stainless steel sculpture referencing the atomic mushroom cloud from the 1953 nuclear bomb Nevada Test Site, USA, and Untitled (Carrier), 2006, a life-size, knee-fallen astronaut in painted and polished bronze, which awakens questions about eternal life, biological possibilities, the climate, and future existence.

=== Memory and places ===
In 2015, Kvie relocated to Marseille, France, where he developed a new body of work focused on the translation of found objects. In his ongoing series—Stele (I-VI), Marker (1-3), and Here, here (I-VI)—Kvie translates random material constellations discovered in public spaces into bronze and concrete. These objects, already existing in our immediate everyday environment or being man-made items that serve our needs, such as road networks and urban infrastructures, face deterioration after being discarded. At his daily walks, Kvie photographs these occurrences, to then model and translate their appearances into new materials, allowing them to regain form and presence.

=== Body and earth ===
After being preoccupied with phenomena in outer space, Kvie began working with basalt, a volcanic rock, searching for ways to bring the human body physically closer to the sculptural material. In his work series, Second Messenger (2017-ongoing), Kvie develops sculptures placed directly on the ground. Meetings between natural materials, basalt stones and leftover materials from construction sites and his own exhibition productions. Amplifying the Richard Sennett book Flesh and Stone (1996), which reflects on society's relationship with the body in a city space, Kvie sources both visual and material parallels between the stone, the body and the space as a way to map an ecology of contemporary sculptural practice.

In 2016, Kvie did a glassblowing workshop at CIRVA in Marseille with friend and artist Jimmie Durham, culminating in the exhibition Glass at Michel Rein in Paris the following year. For the exhibition, Jimmie Durham wrote the text Glass, reflecting on the two artists' understanding and ongoing experiments with the material. For Kvie, the glasswork is connected to his fascination with volcanic eruption. Emphasising the working process itself, Kvie made casts in wet sand using his hands to form the negative of the finished pieces — a way to combine the human body with the earth and the material.

Kvie moved to Naples in 2020 to focus on his explorations of marble and other stone materials. The region’s bronze and marble workshops have been important sites for gaining further material knowledge and ultimately developing new works. During this period, Kvie introduced a new approach to large-scale sculptures where, instead of processing natural sources, he traces and borrows stones from the local areas of the exhibition sites. An essential part of his work with untreated stones unfolds Kvies' awareness of natural entities, other living life forms and connections between the human body and ecosystems.

=== Collectives ===
Kvie is a member of LABINAC, a design collective and exhibition platform formed by Maria Thereza Alves and Jimmie Durham with the dual purpose of designing and making things, and supporting the craft works of Indigenous peoples in Latin America. Their shared practice consists of the circulation of materials or recycled materials to build furniture and design objects. Kvie has primarily contributed with furniture pieces such as The First Shelf, which the collective presented in Milan at ALCOVA in 2021. In 2019, Kvie exhibited with the collective at NOMAD Venice, Palazzo Soranzo van Axel, in Venice, Italy and at Milano Design Week Fuorisalone in Milan, Italy. In 2023, the collective presented the exhibition What we always did at Casa Zalszupin and Galeria Jaquelin Martins in São Paulo, Brazil.

In 2022, Jimmie Durham formed the collective Jimmie Durham & A Stick in the Forest by the Side of the Road, which came about from the idea to gather together a group of artists to form “a community on the road” and to contribute in collaboration with him to documenta fifteen in 2022. Durham did not expect the members of the collective – Bev Koski, Elisa Strinna, Hamza Badran, Iain Chambers, Joen Vedel, Jone Kvie, Maria Thereza Alves, and Wilma Lukatsch – to elaborate a single work or theme. Instead, they would share knowledge, empathy, and humor.

== Bibliography ==
- Here, here, Göteborgtryckeriet / Stavanger Kunstmuseum / Uten tittel, 2019. ISBN 978-82-93502-32-6
- Jone Kvie, Stockholm Offset. ISBN 82-996948-0-9 (Norway) ISBN 91-631-5585-0 (Sweden)
- Manual, Kalejdoskop / Baltic Archive / Selected works from 2005 to 2013. Text in English by Jimmie Durham, 2014. ISBN 9789179361150
