= It Is Almost That =

2011 book

It Is Almost That: A Collection of Image & Text Work by Women Artists & Writers
- Author: Lisa Pearson (editor)
- Language: English
- Genre: Art
- Published: 2011
- Publisher: Siglio Press
- Publication place: United States
- ISBN: 9780979956263

It Is Almost That: A Collection of Image + Text Work by Women Artists & Writers (edited by Lisa Pearson) is a book that collects twenty-six visionary image and text works by women artists and writers published by Siglio Press in 2011.

== Description ==
As a feminist project, Pearson asserts, "There is still deep gender inequality when it comes to the coveted real estate of exhibitions ... and I preferred to make space ... for work by women."

== Contributors ==
Contributors to It Is Almost That are Eleanor Antin, Bambanani Women's Group, Fiona Banner, Louise Bourgeois, Theresa Hak Kyung Cha, Cozette de Charmoy, Ann Hamilton, Jane Hammond, Susan Hiller, Dorothy Iannone, Bhanu Kapil & Rohini Kapil, Helen Kim, Alison Knowles, Ketty La Rocca, Bernadette Mayer, Adrian Piper, Charlotte Salomon, Geneviève Seillé, Molly Springfield, Cole Swensen & Shari DeGraw, Suzanne Treister, Erica Van Horn & Laurie Clark, Carrie Mae Weems, Hannah Weiner, Sue Williams, and Unica Zürn.
