= Jean Fisher =

Jean M Fisher
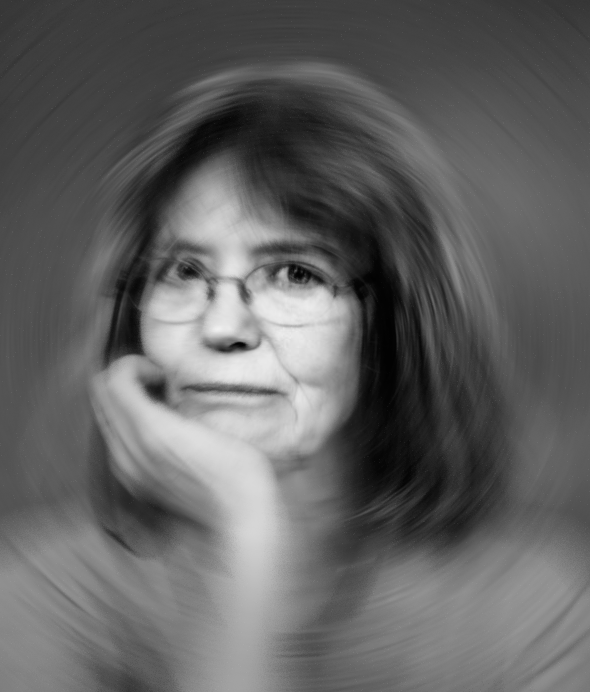
- Jean Fisher
- Born: October 17, 1942; Aldeburgh, Suffolk
- Died: December 12, 2016 (aged 74); London, U.K.
- Education: BSc (Hons) Zoology, University of Durham, PhD Faculty of Medicine, University of Newcastle upon Tyne, BA (Hons) Fine Art, University of Newcastle upon Tyne, Professor Emeritus at Middlesex University
- Occupation: writer
- Years active: 1966-2016
- Website: http://www.jeanfisher.com

Jean Fisher (17 October 1942 – 12 December 2016) was a UK-based art critic and writer. Her research explored the intertwined legacies of colonialism and the emergent conflicts of globalization in Ireland, Native America, the Black Atlantic and more recently Palestine. She studied zoology and fine art. In the 1980s in New York City she contributed regularly to Artforum International. At that time she curated exhibitions of contemporary Native American art with the artist Jimmie Durham. In New York she taught in the School of Visual Arts, State University of New York at Old Westbury and the Whitney Independent Study Program.

From 1992 to 1999 Fisher was editor of the international quarterly Third Text. Her publications include the anthologies Global Visions: Towards a New Internationalism in the Visual Arts (1994), Reverberations: Tactics of Resistance, Forms of Agency (2000), Vampire in the Text, a collection of her writings published by InIVA in 2003, with a preface by Cuauhtémoc Medina and, with Gerardo Mosquera, Over Here: International Perspectives on Art and Culture (2004).

She wrote on the work of numerous artists including Francis Alÿs, Black Audio Film Collective, Sonia Boyce, James Coleman, Lili Dujourie, Willie Doherty, Jimmie Durham, Edgar Heap of Birds, Susan Hiller, Tina Keane, and Gabriel Orozco, and contributed essays to the catalogues to the Venice Biennale (1997), Johannesburg Biennale (1997), Inside the Visible (1998), Carnegie International (1999), Documenta 11 (2002), the Sharjah Biennial (2005), 18th Biennale of Sydney: All Our Relations (2012).

Fisher taught on the Curating MA programme at the Royal College of Art, London, and was Professor of Fine Art and Transcultural Studies at Middlesex University.
