= Richard Grayson (artist) =

British artist, writer and curator (born 1958)

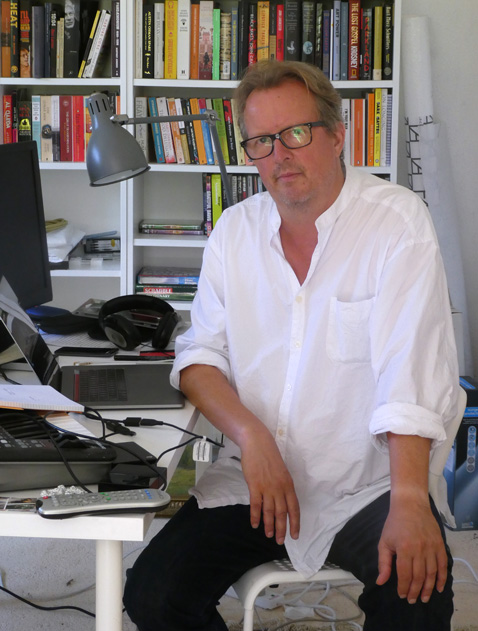
- Born: 1958 (age 67–68); Morecambe UK
- Education: East Herts College of Art and Design, Newcastle upon Tyne Polytechnic B.A. Hons Fine Art
- Known for: Installation, Performance art, Video art, Art Criticism and curatorial work
- Notable work: Messiah, The Golden Space City of God, 2002 Biennale of Sydney
- Awards: British Council Grant 1984, Arts Council of England project grant 2008, Artist in Residence, International Studio Programme, Künstlerhaus Bethanien, Berlin 2003-2004, Artist in Residence, Artpace, San Antonio, Texas 2009. Official site: http://www.richardgrayson.co.uk/

Richard Grayson (born 1958) is a British artist, writer and curator. His art practice encompasses installation, video, painting and performance. He investigates ways that narratives shape our understandings of the world. His art and curatorial practice focus on narrative and the visual arts, belief systems and material expression, and ways cultural practices allow translation between the subjective and social/political realms.

== Career ==
Grayson was a founder member of the Basement Group (1979–1984) in Newcastle upon Tyne. The Basement group was an artists' collective that focused on experimental time-based and performance art practices. It has been described as "unique in this country [the United Kingdom] in combining two functions: it is an 'exhibiting society' for a group of six artists working in time-based media (mostly performance and video), and it has up to the present provided a venue for any performing artist wishing to present work [in Newcastle]."

Grayon's work has been exhibited at Matt's Gallery, London; SMART Project Space, Amsterdam; Art Unlimited at Art Basel 2005, Switzerland; Museum of Contemporary Art Australia; Artpace, San Antonio, Texas and included in the 17th Biennale of Sydney 2010, "THE BEAUTY OF DISTANCE: Songs of Survival in a Precarious Age" and ARSENALE 2012: The First Kyiv International Biennale of Contemporary Art 2012, entitled "The Best of Times, The Worst of Times. Rebirth and Apocalypse in Contemporary Art".

Key works include: "Messiah", 2004, "Intelligence", 2005, "Ghost Houses", 2004–2007, "The Golden Space City of God", 2009, "The Magpie Index", 2010, a video focusing on legendary singer-songwriter Roy Harper, "The Magic Mountain" 2013, "Possessions_inc", 20016-19 and "Weird Shit in Nature", 2024.

His critical writing has been published by Art Monthly, UK and Broadsheet, Australia. He has written catalogue essays and monographs on Mark Wallinger, Roy Harper, Mike Nelson, Susan Hiller and Suzanne Treister.

Between 1992 and 1998, he was Director of the Experimental Art Foundation in Adelaide, Australia.

Grayson was artistic director of the 2002 Biennale of Sydney, titled '(The World May Be) Fantastic', which investigated 'artists and practices using fictions, narratives, invented methodologies, hypotheses, subjective belief systems, modellings, fakes and experiments as a means to make works.'. Writing in Art in America in October 2002, Michael Duncan said of the exhibition that it "gave free rein to complex, often offbeat works predicated on alternate realities. Artists included: Mike Nelson, Chris Burden, Susan Hiller, Vito Acconci, Eleanor Antin, Henry Darger, Janet Cardiff and Rodney Graham. In an article in the Sydney Morning Herald from 17 May 2002, Bruce James describes the exhibition as "a hit".

Grayson curated A Secret Service: Art, Compulsion, Concealment in 2006/7, a Hayward Gallery Touring Exhibition; This Will Not Happen Without You: (Basement to Locus + 1975-2007) in 2006–2007, Arts Council of England Touring exhibition, Polytechnic in 2010 for Raven Row, London, REVOLVER, a series of co-collaborations with Robin Klassnik at Matt's Gallery, London in 2012 and Worlds in Collision, the 3rd Adelaide International in 2014.

Grayson is currently a visiting lecturer at the Ruskin School of Art, University of Oxford, The Royal College of Art, London and holds the position of Bartlett Research Fellow at Newcastle University, UK

== Writing - art catalogues ==
- Worlds in Collision: Adelaide International. Adelaide Festival. 2014. ISBN 978-0-646-91471-8.
- Shaun Gladwell: Cycles of Radical Will. De La Warr Pavilion, Bexhill, England. 2013. ISBN 978-0956286635.
- Suzanne Treister: In The Name of Art. Annely Juda Fine Art, London, England. 2013. ISBN 978-1-904621-54-6.
- Gone to Croatan. Hartware MedienKunstVerein, Revolver Publishing, Berlin, Germany. 2012. ISBN 978-3-86895-188-2.
- Susan Hiller: From Here to Eternity. Verlag fur moderne Kunst Nurnberg, Germany. 2011. ISBN 978-3869842820.
- Singapore Biennale 2011 Catalogue: Essays: Mike Nelson-To The Memory of HP Lovecraft and Robert Macpherson. published by Singapore Biennale. 2011. ISBN 978-981-08-8050-7.
- Ruins (Documents of Contemporary Art): chapter: Mike Nelson - 24 Orwell Street. Whitechapel/MIT Press. 2011. ISBN 9780262516372.
- Susan Hiller: Essay: Ceramic Works. Tate Publishing. 2011. ISBN 978-1854378880.
- Polytechnic. Raven Row, London. 2010.
- More is More: Essay: Against Kipple. Center of Contemporary Art (CoCA), Torun. 2010.
- Beuys is Here: Essay: A Silence of Beuys. De La Warr Pavilion, Bexhill, England. 2009. ISBN 978-0-9562866-0-4.
- Mark Wallinger : Essay: A Number of Disappearances. JRP-Ringier, Switzerland. 2008. ISBN 978-3-905829-78-5.
- Suzanne Treister: 3 Projects: Essay: Only Connect. Annely Juda Fine Art, London, England. 2008. ISBN 978-1-904621-26-3.
- Layla Curtis: Essay: Traceur. CHELSEA space, London, England. 2008.
- Lindsay Seers. SMART Project Space, Amsterdam, Netherlands. 2007.
- This Will Not Happen Without You: From the collective archive of The Basement Group, Projects UK and Locus + (1977-2007). University of Sunderland Press, England. 2007. ISBN 978-1899377251.
- Scary Movie. Contemporary Art Centre SA, Australia. 2007.
- HEXEN 2039: Essay: Waiting for the Gift of Sound and Vision. Black Dog Publishing, London, England. 2006. ISBN 1-904772-63-3.
- In a A Secret Service. Hayward Gallery, London, England. 2006. ISBN 978-1-85332-256-3.
- Mike Nelson: Between a formula and a code: Contributors Peter Eleey, Richard Grayson, Ralph Rugoff and Rob Tufnell. Walther König, Köln. 2006. ISBN 3-86560-039-5.
- 2002 Biennale of Sydney catalogue: Essay: Grasshopper Worlds. Biennale of Sydney, Australia. 2002. ISBN 0958040303.
