= Adelaide International =

Adelaide International may refer to:

- Adelaide International (art exhibition), a series of art exhibitions held at the Samstag Museum
- Adelaide International (tennis), a professional tennis tournament beginning in January 2020
- Adelaide International Raceway, a permanent motor racing circuit at Virginia, South Australia
- Australian International Three Day Event, also known as the Adelaide International Horse Trials, an annual event taking place in the eastern parklands of Adelaide
