= Labels Unlimited =

Labels Unlimited is a series of books designed to give an illustrated overview of influential record labels.

== Publications ==
- Warp by Rob Young (Black Dog Publishing, 2005: ISBN 1-904772-32-3)
- Rough Trade by Rob Young (Black Dog Publishing, 2006: ISBN 1-904772-47-1)
- Ace by David Stubbs (Author) & Rob Young (Editor) (Black Dog Publishing, 2007: ISBN 978-1-906155-03-2)
- Immediate Records by Simon Spence (Black Dog Publishing, 2008: ISBN 978-1-906155-31-5)
- Ninja Tune: 20 Years of Beats & Pieces by Stevie Chick (Author) & Peter Quicke (Editor) (Black Dog Publishing, 2010: ISBN 978 1 907317 00 2)
