= Biennale of Sydney =

International art festival in Australia

- Genre: Arts festival
- Frequency: Biennially
- Locations: Greater Sydney, Australia
- Years active: 52
- Inaugurated: 1973
- Participants: 69 artists (2019)
- Attendance: 854,000 (2019)
- Website: www.biennaleofsydney.art/

The Biennale of Sydney is an international festival of contemporary art, held every two years in Sydney, Australia. It is a large and well-attended contemporary visual arts event in the country. Alongside the Venice and São Paulo biennales and Documenta, it is one of the longest running exhibitions of its kind and was the first biennale to be established in the Asia-Pacific region.

== History ==
In 1973, Franco Belgiorno-Nettis, as co-managing director of Transfield Pty Limited, founded the Biennale of Sydney, which held its first exhibition of 37 artists in the exhibition hall of the then newly opened Sydney Opera House.

== Governance and funding ==
In 2014, major sponsors and founding company Transfield and the Belgiorno-Nettis family withdrew their association with the festival, after artists boycotted the festival over the company's links to immigration detention centres. Also in that year, the federal government cut around $100 million in arts funding over four years from the Australia Council, the main arts funding body in Australia. This led to several turnovers of staff, including the CEO and the board of the Biennale.

From 2014 until 2024, the event received around A$9 million in funding each year. In 2024, it was increased to A$14.4 million, despite government having reduced to around 31% of turnover, from nearly 50% in 2020. Private sponsorship increased from $4.6 million in 2020 to $9.6 million in 2024, including a major boost from the Fondation Cartier.

=== People ===
==== Board of directors ====
The Biennale of Sydney is governed by a board of directors.

Kate Mills, a lawyer and governance expert, was appointed chair in 2015, the third in two years.

As of October 2026, Wiradjuri woman Adelle Robinson, who 20 years of experience producing music festivals, is chair of the board of directors. Artist Khaled Sabsabi is also a member of the board.

==== CEO ====
Barbara Moore has been CEO of Biennale since being appointed in 2019, shortly before the COVID-19 pandemic hit Australia. She is a graduate of the Grant MacEwan College in Edmonton, Canada, and has a Bachelor of Fine Arts from Emily Carr University of Art and Design in Vancouver. After moving to Australia in 2007, she earned a Graduate Certificate in Management from the University of South Australia. She first worked in philanthropy for the Biennale, from 2011 leading the development team. Moore is a board member of the International Biennial Association, and is a member of the Australian Institute of Company Directors. As of 2022 she was on the government's Creative Economy Taskforce. In July 2025, Moore was named as a finalist in the Australian Financial Review's Women of Leadership Awards. In October 2026, she was appointed a Chevalier of the Ordre des Arts et des Lettres, a significant French cultural honour that "recognises individuals who have distinguished themselves through artistic creation or through their contribution to the influence of arts and culture in France and throughout the world".

Moore remains CEO as of October 2026.

==== Former artistic directors ====
- 1973: The Biennale of Sydney, Coordinator: Anthony Wintherbotham
- 1976: Recent International Forms in Art, Thomas G. McCullough
- 1979: European Dialogue, Nick Waterlow
- 1982: Vision in Disbelief, William Wright
- 1984: Private Symbol: Social Metaphor, Leon Paroissien
- 1986: Origins, Originality + Beyond, Nick Waterlow
- 1988: From the Southern Cross: A View of World Art c1940–1988, Nick Waterlow
- 1990: The Readymade Boomerang: Certain Relations in 20th Century Art, René Block
- 1992–1993: The Boundary Rider, Tony Bond
- 1996: Jurassic Technologies Revenant, Lynne Cooke
- 1998: Every Day, 11th Biennale of Sydney, Jonathan Watkins
- 2000: International Selection Committee: Nick Waterlow (chair), Fumio Nanjo, Louise Neri, Hetti Perkins, Sir Nicholas Serota, Robert Storr, Harald Szeemann.
- 2002: (The World May Be) Fantastic,13th Biennale of Sydney, Richard Grayson
- 2004: On Reason and Emotion, curator: Isabel Carlos
- 2006: Zones of Contact, Artistic Director & Curator: Charles Merewether
- 2008: Revolutions – Forms That Turn, Carolyn Christov-Bakargiev
- 2010: The Beauty of Distance: Songs of Survival in a Precarious Age, David Elliott
- 2012: all our relations, artistic directors: Catherine de Zegher and Gerald McMaster
- 2014: You Imagine What You Desire, Juliana Engberg
- 2016: The future is already here – it's just not evenly distributed, Stephanie Rosenthal
- 2018: Superposition: Equilibrium & Engagement, Mami Kataoka
- 2020: Nirin, Brook Andrew
- 2022: rīvus, José Roca
- 2024: Ten Thousand Suns, Cosmin Costinaș and Inti Guerrero
- 2026: Rememory, Hoor Al Qasimi
- 2028: to be curated by Low Kee Hong

== 13th Biennale of Sydney (2002) ==
The 2002 Biennale of Sydney titled (The World May Be) Fantastic investigated 'artists and practices using fictions, narratives, invented methodologies, hypotheses, subjective belief systems, modellings, fakes and experiments as a means to make works'. Writing in Art in America in October, 2002, Michael Duncan said of the exhibition that it "gave free rein to complex, often offbeat works predicated on alternate realities." Artists included: Mike Nelson, Chris Burden, Susan Hiller, Vito Acconci, Eleanor Antin, Henry Darger, Janet Cardiff and Rodney Graham. Richard Grayson was the artistic director.

== 14th Biennale of Sydney (2004) ==
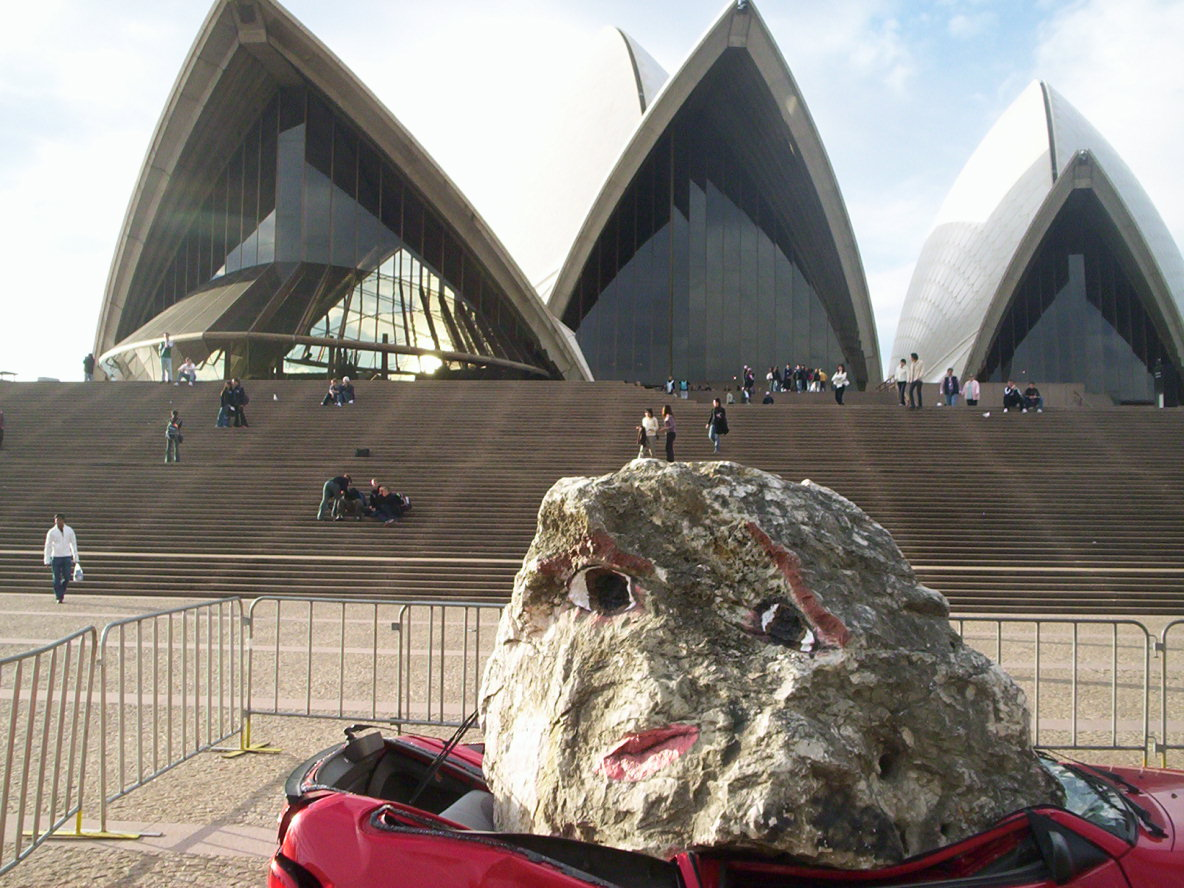
Sydney Biennale 2004 – Jimmie Durham's Still Life with Stone and Car in front of the Sydney Opera House

The 2004 Biennale of Sydney was held from 4 June – 15 August and titled On Reason and Emotion. It featured the work of 51 artists from 32 countries. Much of the exhibition was sited within Sydney's major art museums and galleries, however a number of new projects were created for specific sites at outdoor locations within the city, such as the Royal Botanic Gardens and the forecourt of the Sydney Opera House. Isabel Carlos was the Curator.

== 15th Biennale of Sydney (2006) ==
The 2006 Biennale of Sydney was held from 8 June – 27 August and titled Zones of Contact. It featured the work of 85 artists from 44 countries and was held across 16 diverse venues throughout Sydney including Pier 2/3, at Walsh Bay, the Art Gallery of New South Wales and the Museum of Contemporary Art. Dr Charles Merewether was the artistic director and Curator.

A record of 316,811 visits were recorded over all venues. The festival included a wide range of works and mediums including installation, sculpture, performance, video, sound, photography and painting. 53 artists created 80 new works specifically for the exhibition in response to the concept 'Zones of Contact'. The festival also featured three two-day symposia, over 50 talks, education programs and an 'Art Walk' along the harbour foreshore between principal exhibition venues.

== 16th Biennale of Sydney (2008) ==
The 16th Biennale of Sydney, Revolutions – Forms That Turn, took place from 18 June – 7 September 2008 with leading international curator and writer Carolyn Christov-Bakargiev as artistic director. It achieved record visitation of 436,150 and featured 175 artists from 42 countries.

Cockatoo Island, a former prison and shipyard, was used as a major new venue and won the Biennale a Sydney Music, Arts and Culture (SMAC) Award. Other venues included; Art Gallery of NSW, Pier 2/3 at Walsh Bay, Museum of Contemporary Art, Artspace, Sydney Opera House and the Royal Botanic Gardens. The 16th Biennale of Sydney was awarded Australian Event of the Year & Best Cultural or Arts Event at the 2009 Australian Event Awards.

== 17th Biennale of Sydney (2010) ==
The 17th Biennale of Sydney, titled THE BEAUTY OF DISTANCE: Songs of Survival in a Precarious Age, was held from 12 May – 1 August 2010. Under the Artistic Direction of international curator David Elliott, 444 works by 167 artist and collaborators were selected from 36 countries, making it the largest exhibition staged in the organisations 37-year history.

Venues included Cockatoo Island, the Museum of Contemporary Art, Pier 2/3 at Walsh Bay, Royal Botanic Gardens, Sydney Opera House, Artspace and the Art Gallery of New South Wales. The 17th Biennale of Sydney achieved record attendance of more than 517,000 visits across all venues with 68 artists premiering new works made especially for the exhibition. The 17th Biennale of Sydney's SuperDeluxe@Artspace programme which combined gallery, performance space and bar was awarded Best Arts Event by popular vote at the 2010 Sydney Music, Arts and Culture (SMAC) Awards as well as being a finalist in the Best Major Festival category. The 17th Biennale of Sydney was also a finalist at the 2010 Australian Event Awards in the Best Cultural or Arts Event category.

== 18th Biennale of Sydney (2012) ==
The 18th Biennale of Sydney: all our relations, was held from 27 June – 16 September 2012 across five venues: Cockatoo Island, Pier 2/3, the Art gallery of new south wales, Museum of Contemporary Art Australia and Carriageworks. Under the artistic direction of Gerald McMaster and Catherine de Zegher, 225 works by 101 artists were selected from Australia, New Zealand, the Asia-Pacific, the Americas, Europe, South Africa and the Middle East. Nearly half the artists (49) created works especially for the exhibition, including many substantial collaborative installations.

The exhibition drew record crowds, with more than 665,000 visits recorded over five venues, an increase of 29 per cent on the 2010 attendance figures. The Biennale Bar @ Pier 2/3 was a popular after dark event taking place over five Friday nights in August. In the closing week of the exhibition, Carriageworks and the Biennale of Sydney presented the Australian premieres of En Atendant and Cesena, two performances by Belgian choreographer Anne Teresa De Keersmaeker’s dance ensemble Rosas.

The 18th Biennale of Sydney won the 'Best Cultural, Arts or Music Event' award at the Australian Event Awards in 2013.

== 19th Biennale of Sydney (2014) ==
The 19th Biennale of Sydney: You Imagine What You Desire was presented from 21 March – 9 June 2014, under the artistic direction of Juliana Engberg. Presenting the work of 92 artists from 31 countries, the 19th Biennale was shown at various partner venues including the Art Gallery of New South Wales, Artspace, Carriageworks, Cockatoo Island and the Museum of Contemporary Art Australia.

In 2014 calls were made by refugee activists for artists and others to boycott the 19th Biennale in response to the perceived connections between the Biennale, Transfield Holdings, and Transfield Services, and the latter's contract at Austrlian offshore detention centres

Transfield Holdings, a private company, founded the Biennale of Sydney in 1973 and had continued as the founding partner since that time. In 2014, Transfield Holdings had an 11% investment in a public company, Transfield Services, which had a contract with the Department of Immigration and Border Protection at the detention centres on Manus Island and Nauru. On 19 February 2014, 28 artists participating in the 19th Biennale of Sydney published an open letter to the Board of Directors about their concerns with the sponsorship arrangement with Transfield, stating "We urge you to act in the interests of asylum seekers. As part of this we request the Biennale withdraw from the current sponsorship arrangements with Transfield and seek to develop new ones". Further artists signed in the days following, and by 26 February 2014, 41 Biennale artists had signed the letter. On 26 February 2014, five artists withdrew their participation in the Biennale in protest, owing to their perception that Transfield was profiting from the mandatory detention of asylum seekers, and the Biennale's refusal to cut sponsorship ties with Transfield as requested.

In March, the Board announced that it would cut ties with Transfield. The majority of boycotting artists returned to participate in the 19th Biennale.

That year, over 623,000 visited the Biennale partner venues, including close to 125,000 from overseas, the highest international visitation numbers recorded in the Biennale's 41-year history. There were outdoor works by British artist Nathan Coley on the Eastern Apron of Cockatoo Island, as well as on the exteriors of the Art Gallery of New South Wales and Museum of Contemporary Art Australia.

== 20th Biennale of Sydney (2016) ==
The 20th Biennale of Sydney was curated by Stephanie Rosenthal and took place in 2016. The title was inspired by a comment made by American and Canadian speculative fiction and cyberpunk writer William Gibson. The Biennale was spread across 'Seven Embassies of Thought' titled ‘Spirits’; ‘Non Participation’; ‘Translation’; ‘the Real’; ‘Transition’; ‘Disappearance’; and ‘Stanislaw Lem’. With 12 additional ‘in-between’ spaces. There were 83 participating artists from across 83 countries, including notable Australian artists such as Daniel Boyd (artist), Richard Bell (artist), and Jamie Northas well as international artists such as William Forsythe (choreographer) and films by Samuel Beckett.

== 21st Biennale of Sydney (2018) ==
The 21st Biennale of Sydney, titled SUPERPOSITION, was curated by Mami Kataoka. It included soft sculpture works by the Yarrenyty Arltere Artists of Alice Springs and burial baskets woven by Yvonne Koolmatrie.

== 22nd Biennale of Sydney (2020) ==
The 22nd Biennale of Sydney, titled NIRIN, was presented under the artistic direction of Brook Andrew. NIRIN was an Artist- & First Nations-led Biennale, celebrating First Nations artists. The programme was centered around seven themes: Dhaagun (‘earth’: sovereignty and working together); Bagaray-Bang (‘healing’); Yirawy-Dhuray (‘yam-connection’: food); Gurray (‘transformation’); Muriguwal Giiland (‘different stories’); Ngawal-Guyungan (‘powerful ideas’: the power of objects); and Bila (‘river’: environment), and it featured works by 101 artists and collectives, from 36 countries including for the first time Nepal, Georgia, Afghanistan, Sudan and Ecuador. The works were presented in six venues: Cockatoo Island, Art Gallery of New South Wales, the Museum of Contemporary Art (MCA), the National Art School, Artspace and Campbelltown Arts Centre. NIRIN went online after it was closed ten days after it opened due to COVID-19 restrictions. The founder of New Zealand collective FAFSWAG Tanu Gogo outlined concerns this pivot created for them including 'data-sovereignty, safe-space and intellectual property' but addressed their reprioritization to enable presentation and presented a successful project titled CODESWITCH: Relearn, Reimagine, Recreate – a FAFSWAG Manifesto for the 22nd Biennale of Sydney.

The Museum of Contemporary Art in Sydney featured artists including Tony Albert with Seed Indigenous Youth Climate Network (Australia), Denilson Baniwa (Brazil), Iltja Ntjarra (Many Hands) Art Centre (Mparntwe/Alice Springs, Australia), Kulimoe’anga Stone Maka (Tonga/New Zealand), Noŋgirrŋa Marawili (Darrpirra/Yirrkala, Australia), Aziz Hazara (Afghanistan), Tarek Lakhrissi (France), and Pedro Wonaeamirri (Andranangruwu (Melville Island)/Paluwiyanga, Australia) with Patrick Freddy Puruntatameri (Darwin/Melville Island, Australia).

== 23rd Biennale of Sydney (2022) ==
The 23rd Biennale of Sydney, titled rīvus, was presented under the artistic direction of José Roca. Exhibits were held at various locations in the city including Art Gallery of New South Wales, Museum of Contemporary Art Australia, National Art School, The Rocks and Parramatta.

== 24th Biennale of Sydney (2024) ==
The 24th Biennale of Sydney, titled Ten Thousand Suns, was presented under the artistic direction of Cosmin Costinaș and Inti Guerrero. Exhibits were held at various locations in the city including the Art Gallery of New South Wales, the Chau Chak Wing Museum, Museum of Contemporary Art, UNSW Galleries, and White Bay Power Station. One of the artworks presented at the 24th Biennale of Sydney was created by Udeido Collective.
