= Adelaide International (art exhibition) =

Art exhibition in Adelaide, South Australia

The Adelaide International was a biennial art exhibition held in at the Samstag Museum of Art in Adelaide, South Australia, in partnership with the Adelaide Festival of the Arts, from 2010 to 2014. The series featured a range of contemporary visual works from artists based outside Australia. After a pause in the partnership was agreed, the exhibition was revived by the Samstag in 2019 as a series of three annual events, with the new title Adelaide//International, with a different context and concept: the 2019 exhibition was about the effect of colonisation on indigenous culture.

== History 2010 – 2014 ==
- 2010, 1st Adelaide International: Apart We Are Together, Curator: Victoria Lynn
- 2012, 2nd Adelaide International: Restless, Curator: Victoria Lynn
- 2014, 3rd Adelaide International: Worlds in Collision, Curator: Richard Grayson

=== Apart We Are Together (2010) ===
The inaugural Adelaide International, titled Apart We Are Together, was held from 26 February – 30 April 2010. Under the curatorial direction of Victoria Lynn, works by 13 artists and collaborators were selected from 13 countries: Rosella Biscotti (ITA), Tara Donovan (USA), Nina Fischer & Maroan El Sani (GER), Julian Hooper (NZL), Iman Issa (EGY), Donghee Koo (STH KOR), Li Mu (CHN) Lucy & Jorge Orta (UK/FRA), Raeda Saadeh (PLE), Praneet Soi (IND/NED) and Apichatpong Weerasethakul (THA). Venues included the Anne & Gordon Samstag Museum of Art, the Australian Experimental Art Foundation, Contemporary Art Centre of South Australia, Flinders University City Gallery and Jam Factory Craft and Design. Apart We Are Together was nominated for the Artistic Landmarks in Contemporary Experience awards in the Biennial category, going on to win the ALICE Public's Voice award.

=== Restless (2012) ===
The second Adelaide International: Restless, was held from 1 March – 5 April 2012 across four venues: Anne & Gordon Samstag Museum of Art, the Australian Experimental Art Foundation, Contemporary Art Centre of South Australia and Flinders University City Gallery. Under the curatorial direction of Victoria Lynn, Restless featured works by 18 international artists: Francis Alÿs (BEL/MEX), N.S. Harsha (IND), Chosil Kil (STH KOR/UK), Annika Larsson (SWE), Augustin Maurs (FRA), Teresa Margolles (MEX), Rabih Mroué (LEB), Saskia Olde Wolbers (NED/UK), Postcommodity (USA), Lisa Reihana (NZ), Anri Sala (ALB/GER), Socratis Socratous (CYP), Nancy Spero (USA), Danae Stratou (GRE) and Jinoos Taghizadeh (IRAN). Five brand new works were premiered in Adelaide.

=== Worlds in Collision (2014) ===
3rd Adelaide International: Worlds in Collision

Curator: Richard Grayson

Beginning 27 February 2014

== History 2019–2021: Adelaide//International ==
In 2019, as a continuation of the Adelaide International, but differing in concept and without the partnership of the Festival, the Samstag started a new cycle of three consecutive "Adelaide//International" exhibitions, for the 2019, 2020 and 2021 Adelaide Festivals.

=== 2019 ===
The 2019 Adelaide//International featured the work of four artists: Brook Andrew and Eugenia Lim from Australia, Lisa Reihana from New Zealand, and Ming Wong from Singapore, exploring the effect of colonisation on indigenous culture.

=== 2020 ===
The 2020 exhibition centred around an installation called Somewhere Other by John Wardle Architects in collaboration with Natasha Johns-Messenger. It was Australia's entry in the 2018 Venice Architecture Biennale. It also features work by Belgian artist David Claerbout, Brad Darkson, Zoë Croggon, Helen Grogan and Georgia Saxelby. Due to run from 28 February to 12 June, the exhibition was cut short by the closure of the Samstag in March 2020 owing to the COVID-19 pandemic in Australia.
