= Lindsay Seers =

British artist

Lindsay Seers (born 1966) is a British artist living and working in London. Her installation Extramission 6 (Black Maria) was included in Nicolas Bourriaud's Tate Triennial, 'Altermodern' in 2009. She was recently awarded the Derek Jarman Award with a commission of four short films for Channel 4; the Paul Hamlyn Award in 2010 and the Sharjah Art Foundation Award in 2012. She is represented by Matt's Gallery, London.

Seers is associated with a genre defined by Mike Brennan as Neo-Narration. Nicolas Bourriaud in his book Altermodern (Tate Triennial 2009) describes her work as ‘ceaselessly re-editing the documentary of her life as a migrant woman in modern day Britain’, although in fact her works use biography more widely as a locus for a complex intertwining of events.

== Early life ==
Seers was born in 1966 in Mauritius into a naval family. Seers didn't speak until she was seven years old after the family's departure from the island. During this time her mother claims her daughter possessed an eidetic memory (otherwise known as photographic memory) so vivid that she felt no need for verbal communication. She first spoke after seeing a photographic portrait of herself, which prompted her to ask "is that me?" Upon learning to speak she seems to have lost her ability of eidetic recall, and by the age of nine she became obsessively interested in photography. Seers found comfort behind the lens of the camera and used photography to recapture the immediacy of sensation that she enjoyed in the images of her eidetic memory. Issues of memory continued to haunt her work particularly after the loss of her step-sister Christine Parkes with whom she often collaborated. Christine was involved in a moped accident in 2001 and subsequently went missing in Rome. She has never been since.

She studied at the Slade School of Fine Art (BA Hons, Sculpture and Media 1991–94) and at Goldsmiths College (MA Fine Art 1999–2001).

== Work ==
Seers' early fascination with photography led to a project of internalising the technology of the camera, in which she used her own body to produce photographs. The cavity of her mouth became the camera body and her lips became the camera aperture and shutter. This procedure entailed covering herself with a black lightproof sack, positioning a small piece of light-sensitive paper in the back of her mouth and then placing a gum-shield with a small pin-hole incision in front of it. In the moment of capture she closed her lips or placed a hand over her mouth to make the exposure before returning into the sack to develop the image. The resultant images from this project appear framed by her teeth, stained with saliva and tinged red by the blood within her cheeks.

Her work Extramission 6 was acquired by the Tate in 2009.

Her large scale installations have been shown internationally in Kiasma (Helsinki, Finland), Bonniers Kunsthalle (Stockholm, Sweden), MONA (Hobart, Australia), Lofoten International Art Festival (Norway), National Gallery of Denmark (SMK, Copenhagen, Denmark), Toulouse International Art Festival (France), Tate Britain (UK), Baltic Centre for Contemporary Art, (Gateshead, UK).

=== Works ===
The Truth Was Always There: The Collection, Lincoln (Sep 2006 – Jan 2007); Smart Project Space, Amsterdam (2007); Thurgau, Ittengen, Switzerland (2010); Lofoten International Art Festival, Norway (2011). Arts Council Collection. Review: Rosalie Doubal, Lindsay Seers: Human Camera, Interface, 15 November 2009

It has to be this way 1: Matt's Gallery, London (21 January–15 March 2009); FACT Liverpool (2010); Aspex, Portsmouth (2010); Nikolaj Art Centre, Copenhagen (2010–2011) Review: Rebecca Geldard, ArtReview magazine, Issue 31, ArtReview magazine, Issue 31 p. 116

It has to be this way 2: National Gallery Denmark, SMK (2010); Baltic, Gateshead (2011); Mead Gallery, Warwick (2010). Review: Paul Usherwood, Lindsay Seers: It has to be this way², Art Monthly, Issue 345, April 2011

Entangled 2: Turner Contemporary, Margate (2012); Matt's Gallery, London (2013) Review: Charmian Griffin, Time Out, 24 October 2013

Monocular: Lofoten International Art Festival (2011); Quad, Derby (2013); Galleri Festiviteten, Oslo (2012); Kunstverein, Freiburg (2012); Sami Art Centre, Karasjok, Norway (2014) Review: Robert Clark & Skye Sherwin, ‘The best exhibitions of 2013’ The Guardian, 21 December 2013

Extramission 6: Smart Project Space, Amsterdam (2007); Bonniers Kunsthalle, Stockholm (2012); Kiasma, Helsinki (2012); Tate Britain (2009); TPW Toronto (2011) Review: Jorg Heiser, Frieze magazine, April 2009

Nowhere Less Now: Artangel, Tin Tabernacle, London (2012) Review: Ben Luke, London Evening Standard, 20 September 2012 Review: Laura McLean-Ferris, The Independent, 4 September 2012

Nowhere Less Now 2: in 'The Red Queen' MONA (Tasmania, Australia) (2014)

Fleeting Exits: Sursock Museum, Beirut, Lebanon. (13 July – 8 October 2018). Works by Ryan Gander, Rebecca Horn, Laure Prouvost, and Lindsay Seers. Curated by Marwan T. Assaf.

Vanishing Twin (Tetragametic Chimerism): Fotogalleriet, Oslo, Norway. (23 January - 2 March 2019)

Care(less): Ikon Gallery, Birmingham. (15- 23 January 2020)

Every Thought There Ever Was: John Hansard Gallery, Southampton. (8 February – 11 April 2020)

Nowhere Less Now3 [Flying Saucer]. Sharjah Art Foundation (26 September - 26 December 2020)

Vam(pyre) Reality, Riga Art Space, Latvia (solo show) 13 April - 2 June 2024

Cold light FRAC Triennial 10 June - 14 January 2023 (France)

Double Knowledge, Alice Black Gallery 13 April - 13 May 2023

Hold onto (G)love. A postal project.

Cold Light, Turner Contemporary 22 October - 8 January 2023 (Margate UK)

The Letter Paintings and Drawings | Studio Show

Cold Light 2, E-Werk Luckenwalde 17 September - 11 February 2023 (Germany)

Entangled 4 (Theatre 4) 22 November - 29 January 2023 (Taiwan)

Cold Light, Matt’s Gallery, London

Hi-Noon (Photo London) Limited Edition Print
