= Third Text =

American peer-reviewed academic journal

- Discipline: Visual arts
- Language: English, French
- Edited by: Richard Dyer

Publication details
- History: 1987–present
- Publisher: Routledge (United Kingdom)
- Frequency: Bimonthly

Standard abbreviations
- ISO 4: Third Text

Indexing
- ISSN: 0952-8822

Links
- Journal homepage

Third Text is a leading peer-reviewed academic journal covering art in a global context. After founder and editor Rasheed Araeen's earlier art magazine Black Phoenix, which started in 1978 and published only three issues, Third Text was launched as a theoretical art journal in 1987. The journal was edited by Jean Fisher (1992–1999), followed by Richard Appignanesi (2008–2015) and Richard Dyer (2015–present).

== Contributors ==
Contributors include prominent scholars of black studies, feminist theory, and politically engaged art criticism, including Stuart Hall, Kobena Mercer, Paul Gilroy, Laura Mulvey, Lucy Lippard, Coco Fusco, Ella Shohat, Griselda Pollock, Claire Bishop, T. J. Demos, Gregory Sholette, Olu Oguibe, Julia Bryan-Wilson, Benita Parry, Zeynep Çelik, Boris Groys, Jimmie Durham, Eddie Chambers, Jose-Carlos Mariategui and Michael D. Harris.

== Relaunch ==
The journal was relaunched in 2015 with a new group of editors, selected by an independent panel, a new advisory board, and trustees, and it has published a number of guest-edited special issues since its relaunch.
