= Udeido Collective =

Udeido Collective is an art collective of Papuan artists living in Papua and Indonesia. The collective was started in 2018 by young Papuan artists to explore social issues faced by Papuans living under Indonesia, such as racism, social exclusion, and the Papua conflict. The name Udeido is derived from 'ude', an Indigenous plant commonly used to heal wounds.

== History ==
Udeido Collective was established in 2018 by a group of Papuan artists and students in Yogyakarta, Java, Indonesia. They then recruited other artists to join the collective, including some living in Papua. Members of the collective include Betty Adii, Michael Yan Devis, Yanto Gombo, Nelson Natkime, Constantinus Ruharusun, Andre Takimai, and Dicky Takndare.

One of the collective's founders, Dicky Takndare, "identifies a narrative that positions expressions of Papuan culture as a threat to the state,‘a chronic wound in the body of the Indonesian nation’ that is passed down from one generation of oppressors to the next."

The collective was initiated due to the lack of media representation of Papuan voices in the Indonesian media and in the art world. The collective aimed to use art to bring awareness about issues faced by Papuans, which include neglect and mistreatment by the Indonesian government. They were concerned about incidents of Papuan displacement from Nduga Regency in 2018, and other subsequent displacements which have implicated the Indonesian military. A high-profile protest by Papuan students in Surabaya on August 16, 2019, which ended in brutality perpetrated by the Indonesian military has been reflected in the works made by the collective.

== Programming ==
Udeido Collective have shown their works throughout Indonesia as well as internationally. Their first exhibition was at the Sangkring Art Space in 2019. The collective also virtually exhibited works by Papuan and non-Papuan artists that spoke on the theme of injustice faced by Papuans. Titled "Tonawi Mana", the exhibition was presented on the collective's website. Following that exhibition, they also showed their works at the Biennale Jogja 2021.Also in 2021, Udeido collective took part in "Present Continuous / Sekarang Seterusnya" exhibition at the MACAN museum in Jakarta. Koreri Projection, a work by Udeido Collective was presented at the Lahore Biennale in 2024. Also in 2024, a work by the collective titled "The Koreri Transformation" was shown at the Sydney Biennale. In 2025, the collective presented their work in Amsterdam at an exhibition titled "Lawan!" In March of 2025, the collective was involved in the Merauke conference where they created artworks that included drawings and letters by victims of displacement in Merauke province from large-scale deforestation enacted by the Indonesian government to create rice fields and sugarcane plantations.
