= Maria Thereza Alves =

Brazilian-born artist and activist (born 1961)

- Born: 1961 (age 64–65); São Paulo, Brazil
- Education: Cooper Union
- Occupations: Installation artist, video artist, activist, filmmaker, writer
- Known for: Seeds of Change (1999–now)
- Movement: Conceptual art
- Partner: Jimmie Durham (?–2021; his death)

Maria Thereza Alves (born 1961) is a Brazilian-born American and German installation artist, video artist, activist, filmmaker, and writer. She lives in Berlin.

== Early life and education ==
Maria Thereza Alves was born in São Paulo in 1961. When she was a child, her family moved to New York City to escape the dictatorship in Brazil. She attended Cooper Union, and graduated in architecture (BFA 1985).

== Career ==
In 1978, Alves presented at the United Nations Human Rights Committee meeting in Geneva on the indigenous population human rights abuses in Brazil. She is a co-founder of the Partido Verde (or Green Party) of São Paulo in 1987.

Her long-term art project Seeds of Change studies colonialism, slavery, migration, and the global commerce. The series was started in 1999 and focuses on displaced plant seeds used to balance shipping vessels during the colonial period. It has been held in port cities such as Marseille, Reposaari, Liverpool, Exeter–Topsham, Dunkirk, Bristol, New York City, and Antwerp.

In 2016, she won the biennial Vera List Center Prize for Art and Politics. Her work was part of the group exhibition "Disappearing Legacies: The World as Forest" (2018) at Charité medical university. Alves has participated in Documenta (13), Manifesta 12, Sharjah Biennal in 2017, and the Biennale of Sydney in 2020. In 2021, Alves with the mural "Witnesses" was chosen by Associazione Tevereterno Onlus and Fondazione Quadriennale to replace William Kentridge’s mural on the same spot on the Tiber in Rome.

Her former partner was artist Jimmie Durham, who died in 2021.

== Publications ==
- de Llano, Pedro, ed. (2018). Maria Thereza Alves: The Long Road to Xico / El largo camino a Xico, 1991–2015. Sternberg Press. ISBN 978-8499592381.
