= Gerardo Mosquera =

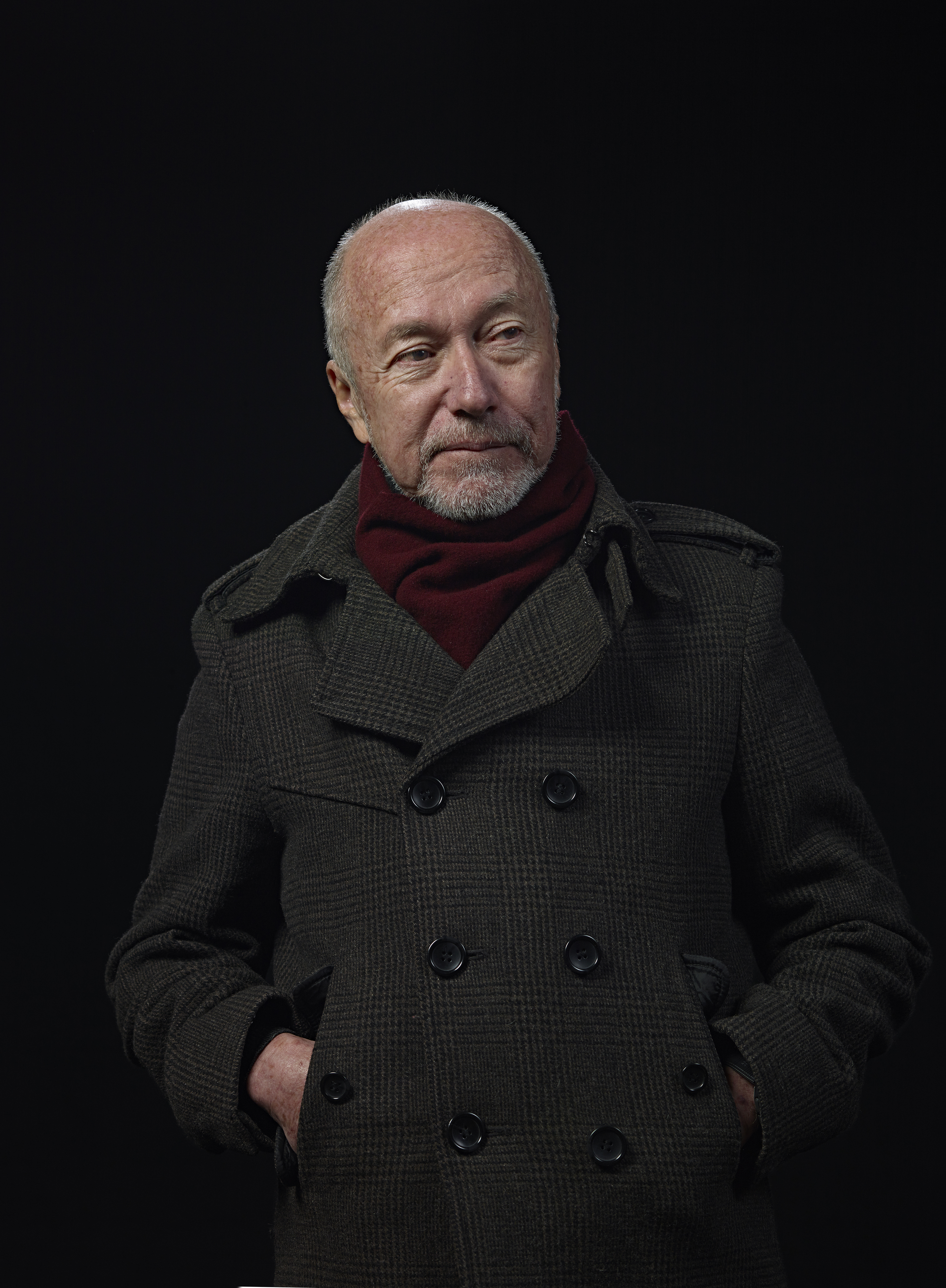
Mosquera by Wang Guofeng.

Gerardo Mosquera (born 1945 in Havana, Cuba) is a freelance curator, critic, art historian, and writer based in Havana, Cuba.

He was one of the organizers of the first Havana Biennial in 1984 and remained central to the curatorial team until he resigned in 1989. Since then, his activity has been mainly international, traveling, lecturing and curating exhibitions in 80 countries. Mosquera was adjunct curator at the New Museum of Contemporary Art, New York, from 1995 to 2009. Since 1995 he has been advisor in the Rijksakademie van beeldende kunsten (State Academy of Fine Arts) in Amsterdam. His publications include books on art and art theory (and a short stories' volume), and 600 articles, reviews and essays have appeared in magazines, including: Art Nexus, Cahiers, Lápiz, Neue Bildende Kunst, Oxford Art Journal, Poliester, Third Text. Among other volumes, Mosquera has edited Beyond the Fantastic: Contemporary Art Criticism from Latin America and co-edited (with Jean Fisher) Over Here: International Perspectives on Art and Culture. His theoretical essays – which have been influential in discussing art's cultural dynamics in an internationalized world, and contemporary Latin American art – are in English, but have been collected in books in Caracas and Madrid in Spanish, and in Chinese in Beijing. Mosquera was the Artistic Director of PHotoEspaña, Madrid (2011–2013), the Chief Curator of the 4th Poly/Graphic San Juan Triennial (2015-2016), co-curator of the 3rd Documents, Beijing (2016) and co-curator of the Guangzhou Image Triennial (2021).

== Early work ==
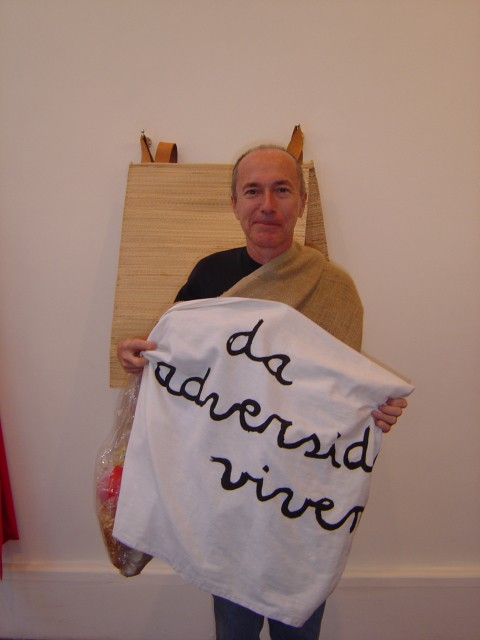
Mosquera wearing Hélio Oiticica's parangolé Da adversidade vivemos.

Mosquera obtained his licenciatura in History of Art at the University of Havana in 1977.

Since the early 1970s he was working as art, cinema and theater critic, researcher and journalist in Havana. He published thorough investigations on Servando Cabrera Moreno and Manuel Mendive two Cuban artists who had previously been marginalized for the erotic and religious Afro-Cuban (Mendive) content of their art, and as a result of homophobic cultural policies. Mosquera became the main critic and "ideologist" of the new Cuban art, which he supported since its inception. In the 1980s this movement renovated the Cuban art scene, breaking away from official dogmatism and introducing contemporary critical tendencies. It was successful in pushing the Ministry of Culture to open up towards a more liberal cultural policy. Mosquera's critical writings on the new Cuban art were instrumental to this turn, while he also promoted the new artists internationally. This movement triggered a critical and reflexive inclination that distinguishes Cuba's arts until today. Mosquera's work has also always looked beyond Cuba, as can be seen in his book El diseño se definió en Octubre (Design was Defined in October), about Russian avant-garde art and design and its worldly impact, published in Havana in 1989 and Bogotá in 1992.

== Havana Biennial ==
The first Havana Biennial took place in 1984. It became the fourth international biennial (after Venice, São Paulo and Sydney) and the sixth huge international periodic art event to be established —following the aforementioned biennials, the Carnegie International and Documenta. Supported by the Cuban government, it was a vast show, but restricted to Latin America. In 1986 the 2nd Havana Biennial presented the first global show of contemporary art ever: more than 50 exhibitions and events that gathered 690 artists from 57 countries focusing on postcolonial contemporary art and not on traditional and religious practices. The next Biennial edition, in 1989, introduced radical curatorial changes that moved it away from the Venice and São Paulo paradigms, launching a new model that influenced the way in which the new biennials were organized. Transformations included basing the whole event (shows, conferences, workshops, etc.) on a general theme, the combination of a centralized curation that avoided national representations with a decentralized structure involving a constellation of multiple events, the link with the city, and the eradication of awards. Recently, it has become clear that it was the Havana Biennial and not Les magiciens de la terre –an exhibition that was advertised as "the first global show"—, that was initiating the way in which globalization will take shape in art, triggering "a new breed of contemporary biennials born of a global context" (Istanbul, Johannesburg, Gwangju, Lyon, etc.). The Havana Biennial approached for the first time the multiple practices of contemporary art around the world, out of the Western mainstream. Since 1984, Mosquera was Havana Biennial's "leader of the curatorial work", reformulating the premise and methodology of the event, with which his "own aesthetic and intellectual interests became deeply embedded." He resigned in 1989, immediately after the 3rd Biennial, due to the escalating repression in the cultural sector, and to political contradictions with the Cuban regimen and about the Biennial's future.

== International work ==
After his resignation to the Havana Biennial, Mosquera was banned to publish, curate and lecture in his country until today, and since then he has been working as a freelance internationally. In 1990 he was a Guggenheim Fellow.

From 1995 to 2009 he was adjunct Curator at the New Museum of Contemporary Art, New York, although his work was seriously hampered by legal constraints due to the United States embargo against Cuba, where he continued to live. Together with Dan Cameron he set off a program at the Museum that introduced a broader international approach in the New York art scene. His radical notion of "the museum-as-hub" transformed the New Museum's Education Department to include what is called the Museum as Hub, "a new model for curatorial practice and institutional collaboration established to enhance our understanding of contemporary art. Both a network of relationships and an actual physical site…" with an international program of its own. Mosquera's theoretical work pioneered critical discussions about the complex cultural processes of modern and contemporary art from non-mainstream countries, especially in relation to mainstream art, globalization and postcolonial dynamics. He has also contributed to promote an open, multifaceted view on Latin American art, moving away from the identity stereotypes that prevailed in the 1980s – his standings being sometimes polemical. The exhibition Ante America, which he co-curated in 1992 (see below), was a landmark for this new view on Latin American art. Mosquera's ideas, position and curatorial and editorial practice have been significant in the new scenario of broad international circulation of art. He introduced the notion of "from here" to oppose the "appropriation" paradigms – such as the Brazilian idea of "anthropophagy" – that prevailed to discuss postcolonial art's strategies, conferring it an active role in the construction of global metaculture. The curator's work has lately focused on projects out of the white cube, trying to achieve artistic communication with broader audiences, beyond the art world's elite. Some examples are his contribution to the Liverpool Biennial, and shows that have tried to create an active dialogue with the public space and to involve people in the streets, as CiudadMultipleCity. Arte>Panamá 2003 (), The Sky Within My House, Contemporary Art in Patios of Quito (), and ¡Afuera! (see all below).

== Curatorial work ==
Eyes that Have Sight, Fundación Cortés, San Juan, 2022.
Hot Spot. Caring for a Burning World, Galleria Nazionale d'Arte Moderna e Contemporanea, Rome, 2022.
Co-curator Guangzhou Image Triennial 2021: Rethinking Collectivity, Guangdong Museum of Art, March 9 to May 29, 2021.
Useless: Machines for Dreaming, Thinking and Seeing. , Bronx Art Museum, March 27, 2019 to September 1, 2019.
Adiós Utopia. Dreams and Deceptions in Cuban Art Since 1950, The Museum of Fine Arts, Houston, Texas, USA, March 3, 2017 (with René Francisco Rodríguez and Elsa Vega), Walker Art Center, Nov 11, 2017–Mar 18, 2018.
Cristina Lucas. Manchas en el silencio, Sala Alcalá 31, Madrid, 14 de septiembre de 2017.
BRIC-à-brac. The Jumble of Growth, Today Art Museum, Beijing, December 10, 2016 (with Huang Du).
Vida. Gervasio Sánchez, CEART Fuenlabrada, Madrid, Spain, December–March, 2016; Afundación, Santiago de Compostela, October 2017-January 2018; Sala de Exposiciones de la Diputación de Huesca, Huesca, March–May 2018; Afundación, A Coruña, June–September 2018.
Cristina Lucas. Iluminaciones profanadas, Museo de Arte Contemporáneo de Puerto Rico, Santurce, San Juan, November 18, 2016.
Fernando Sánchez Castillo. Hoy fue también un día soleado , Sala de Arte Público Siqueiros, Mexico City, June 7, 2016.
4th Poly/Graphic San Juan Triennial: Latin American and the Caribbean, Displaced Images / Images in Space, Antiguo Arsenal de la Marina Española, Old San Juan; Casa Blanca; Cagas Art Museum; Museum of Art of Puerto Rico; Museum of Art and History of San Juan; Museum and Center for Humanistic Studies Dr. Josefina Camacho Camacho de la Nuez, Turabo University; Museum of History, Anthropology and Art, UPR Río Piedras; Ponce Art Museum; Puerto Rico Museum of Contemporary Art; Puerto Rico, October 24, 2015 to February 28, 2016 (with Alexia Tala and Vanessa Hernández Gracia).
Perduti nel Paesaggio / Lost in Landscape, Museo di arte moderna e contemporánea di Trento e Rovereto, April 4, 2014.
Artificial Amsterdam. The City as Artwork, de Appel, Amsterdam, June 28, 2013.
Manuel Álvarez Bravo. Un photographe aux aguets, Jeu de Paume, Paris, October 15, 2012; Fundación MAPFRE, Madrid, February 12, 2013; Museo Amparo, Puebla, June 2013 (with Laura González Flores).
Here We Are. Richard Avedon, Richard Billingham, Paz Errázuriz, Lilla Szász, Círculo de Bellas Artes, Madrid, June 7, 2011 (with Mónica Portillo).

== Memberships ==
- 2011, Academic Council for Programming, Museo Universitario de Arte Contemporáneo (MUAC), UNAM, México DF
- 2010, International Adviser, Art in General, New York
- 2009, Technical Committee, MOMA Medellin
- 2005, CIFO Grants and Commissions Programs’ Advisory Committee, Miami
- 1998-2003, Prince Claus Awards Selection Committee
- 1997, Consultant, Art Nexus, Bogotá
- 1996, Advisory Board ARCOLatino, Madrid
- 1995, Advisor, Rijksakademie van Beeldende Kunsten, Amsterdam
- 1995, Advisory Council, Atlántica, Las Palmas de Gran Canaria
- 1994–1995 Administrative Council, International Association of Art Critics, Paris
- 1993–2000, Editorial Board, Poliester, Mexico
- 1993-2013, Advisory Council, Third Text, London
- 1993, International Association of Art Critics
- 1991, Permanent Advisor, Instituto Superior de Artes Plásticas Armando Reverón, Caracas
- 1989, Advisory Board, The House of Africa, Havana
- 1989, Writers and Artists Union of Cuba
- 1986–1990, Advisory Board, Editorial Letras Cubanas, Havana
