= Jinoos Taghizadeh =

Iranian multidisciplinary artist

- Jinoos Taghizadeh
- Born: 29 July 1971 (age 55); Tehran, Iran
- Education: University of Tehran (Bachelor of Arts, Sculpture); Cultural Heritage Organization (Bachelor of Arts, Dramatic Literature)
- Occupation: Artist
- Children: Arshia Jam
- Relatives: Jila Taghizadeh (Sister)
- Website: https://jinoostaghizadeh.ca/

Jinoos Taghizadeh (born 1971) is an Iranian multidisciplinary artist, storyteller, and activist. Her practice includes painting, collage, video, performance, and installation, and addresses political, social, and historical subjects. Her work has been described as part of a tradition of oppositional art in contemporary Iranian art.

== Life and career ==
Taghizadeh holds a bachelor's degree in sculpture from the University of Tehran, where she also studied literature and drama. She has worked as an editor for the fine arts sections of several art magazines. Her work has been exhibited in Iran and internationally, including at the Whitechapel Gallery, MAXXI Museum, and Kunsthalle Wiesbaden. In 2011, she served on the jury of the Sixth Tehran National Sculpture Biennial. She has received grants and artist residencies, including the Avolon and RHA Global Studio Award in Ireland and a residency at WARP Contemporary Art Center in Belgium. Following the 2022–2023 political uprising in Iran, Taghizadeh left the country and subsequently settled in Toronto, where she lives and works.

== Artistic practice ==
Taghizadeh works across painting, collage, video, performance, and installation, often combining different media and incorporating pre-existing textual and visual materials. Her work addresses political, social, and historical subjects and has been described as part of a tradition of oppositional art in contemporary Iranian art. Newspapers, official postage stamps, historical images, literature, and other cultural materials are among the elements she has incorporated into her works.

A recurring feature of Taghizadeh's practice is the juxtaposition of familiar cultural and political materials to examine how events and experiences are represented in public life. In Rock, Paper, Scissors, for example, she combined Persian newspaper accounts of the Iranian Revolution of 1979 with images from Western paintings and other visual materials, using juxtaposition and irony to create an alternative reading of official narratives.

Her performances have similarly brought cultural and religious practices into public spaces in a critical way. In Nazr (Oblation), she appropriated the form of a religious offering in a performance in front of the Sheikh Lotfollah Mosque in Isfahan. The performance blurred the boundaries between religious practices associated with the state and the secular context of performance art. In another performance dedicated to the poet Forough Farrokhzad, she placed images and pages from Farrokhzad's books along a route through Tehran, connecting literary memory with public space and collective participation. Through these approaches, Taghizadeh's work brings together personal and collective experience, cultural memory, and public life. Her work uses appropriation, juxtaposition, performance, and ambiguity to address political and social subjects, often leaving their meanings open to interpretation.
