= Brook Andrew =

Australian visual artist

Brook Andrew (born 1970 in Sydney, Australia) is an Australian contemporary artist.

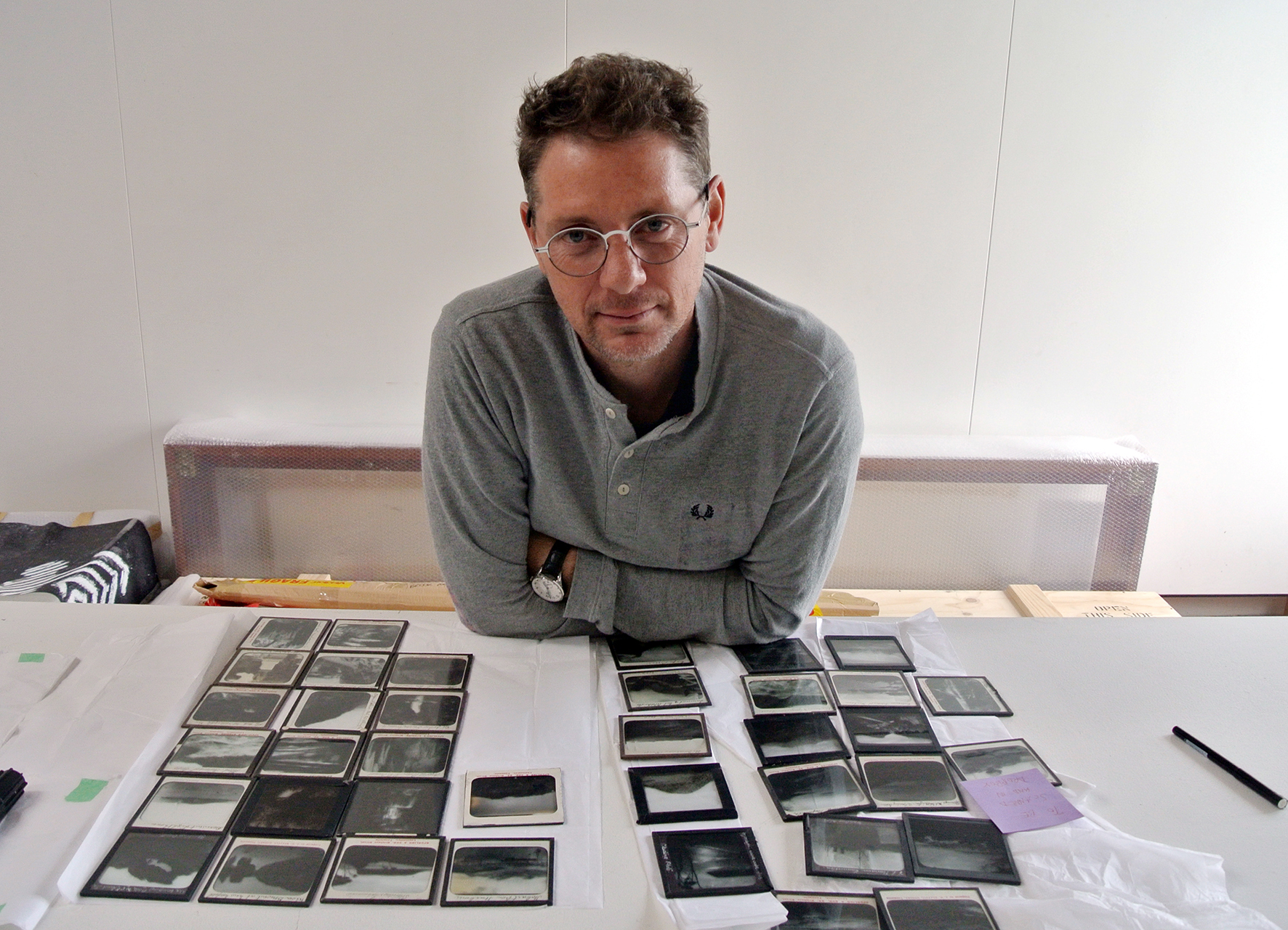
Brook Andrew in 2015

== Work ==
Andrew has exhibited internationally since 1996. His work focuses on Western narratives, especially relating to colonialism in the Australian context, and consists of interdisciplinary works, video, sculpture, photography and immersive installations. In 2014 he worked closely with the collections of the Museo Nacional Centro de Arte Reina Sofia, Museo de América and Museo Nacional de Antropología for the exhibition Really Useful Knowledge at the Museo Nacional Centro de Arte Reina Sofia, to create an immersive installation, A Solid Memory of the Forgotten Plains of our Trash and Obsessions, reflecting on Spanish, British and Australian history and colonialism. In 2015, Andrew created The Weight of History, A Mark in Time at Barangaroo in Sydney, incorporating Aboriginal art with modern landscapes and architecture.

Andrew was awarded a 2017 Smithsonian Artist Research Fellowship and completed a term as a Photography Residencies Laureate at Musée du quai Branly, Paris, investigating the relationship between the colonial photographer and the sitter. His other research includes an international comparative three-year Australian Research Council grant called Representation, Remembrance and the Monument, responding to calls for a national memorial to Aboriginal loss and the frontier wars. Andrew and his collaborator Trent Walter will complete Australia's first official government-supported memorial to the frontier wars, where Tunnerminnerwait and Maulboyheener, the first two Aboriginal men to be hanged in Melbourne, will be installed adjacent Melbourne Gaol.

In 2018, Andrew was announced as the Artistic Director of the 22nd Biennale of Sydney for 2020. NIRIN, the title of the 22nd Biennale of Sydney translates to ‘edge’ in Wiradjuri, the language of Andrew’s mother. As artistic director of this Biennale, Andrew exhibits and celebrates not only Australia’s indigenous cultures but also those of First Nations artists and communities from around the world. As the artist has explained, 'I am interested in challenging the narratives around what sovereignty means for Indigenous peoples, and other alternative narratives, not just around Indigeneity.'

== Awards ==
- 1998: Kate Challis RAKA Award, for an Artwork by an Aboriginal visual artist
