= Pedro Wonaeamirri =

Aboriginal Australian artist

Pedro Wonaeamirri (born 1974) is a contemporary Aboriginal Australian painter, carver, printmaker, singer, dancer, and performer. As a member of the Tiwi people, Wonaeamirri regards his art as both a continuation of Tiwi culture as well as an open-ended exploration of style and technique.

== Biography ==
Wonaeamirri was born in 1974 at Pirlangimpi, Melville Island. Raised by his grandmother, Jacinta Wonaeamirri, Pedro Wonaeamirri was taught the Tiwi cultural customs and artforms by both the members of his kin and of his community. Wonaeamirri learned how to carve under the guidance of his uncle, Romuald Puruntatameri, and learned how to paint by watching elder artists at Jilamara Arts and Crafts, such as Kitty Kantilla and Paddy Freddy Puruntatameri. Wonaeamirri is also an experienced singer and dancer, both of which form an important part of Tiwi culture.

== Career ==
Wonaeamirri began his career at Jilamara Arts and Crafts in 1991, for which he has since served as an artist, Vice President, and President of the center. Wonaeamirri has exhibited widely in both solo and group exhibitions (see Significant Exhibitions), and has also been recognized or considered for numerous awards (see Recognitions).

== Style ==
Wonaeamirri uses traditional natural pigments and materials collected from his country, including ochre, feathers, beeswax, and wood. In his paintings Wonaeamirri utilizes kayimwagakimi, the traditional Tiwi wood comb, to create dotted infill, which is overlain upon fields of red, yellow, white, and black. Wonaeamirri depicts pwoja (body painting designs) in a style that is both distinctly Tiwi and unique to himself, by experimenting with designs and patterns while alluding to an illustrious cultural history.

== Significant exhibitions ==
- Nginingawila Jilamara Kapi Purunguparri (Our Designs on Bark)National Gallery of Victoria, Melbourne (1992)
- Art of the Tiwi, National Gallery of Victoria, Melbourne (1994)
- Australian Perspecta 1999: Living Here Now – Art and Politics, Art Gallery of New South Wales, Sydney (1999)
- Beyond the Pale: Contemporary Indigenous Art, 2000 Adelaide Biennial of Australian Art, Art Gallery of South Australia, Adelaide (2000)
- Islands in the Sun, National Gallery of Australia, Canberra (2001)
- Place Made: Australian Print Workshop, National Gallery of Australia, Canberra (2004)
- The 19th Asian International Art Exhibition, Fukuoka Asian Art Museum, Fukuoka, Japan (2004)
- Primavera, Museum of Contemporary Art, Sydney (2005)
- One Sun, One Moon: Aboriginal Art in Australia, Art Gallery of New South Wales, Sydney (2007)
- The Dreamers, Art Gallery of New South Wales, Sydney (2009)
- Art+Soul: A Journey into the World of Aboriginal Art, Art Gallery of New South Wales, Sydney (2010); Country, Culture, Community, Art Gallery of New South Wales, Sydney (2009)
- The Tiwi: Art from Jilamara & Munupi Artists, Harvey Art Projects, Ketchum, Idaho, United States (2013)
- We are Tiwi: Art from Jilamara & Munupi Artists, Kluge-Ruhe Aboriginal Art Collection, Virginia, United States (2014)
- All About Art, White Canvas, Brisbane (2015)

== Recognitions ==
- Finalist, National Aboriginal and Torres Strait Islander Award (1994, 1995, 2004, 2005, 2007, 2009 and 2012)
- Finalist, Shell Fremantle Print Award, Fremantle Arts Centre, Perth (2000)
- Finalist, Togart Contemporary Art Award, Darwin (2007)
- Recipient, Australia Council Fellowship (1996)
- Recipient, Young Australian of the Year (Arts Section, Northern Territory; 2000)
