= Matt's Gallery =

Coordinates: 51.519429°N 0.035874°W

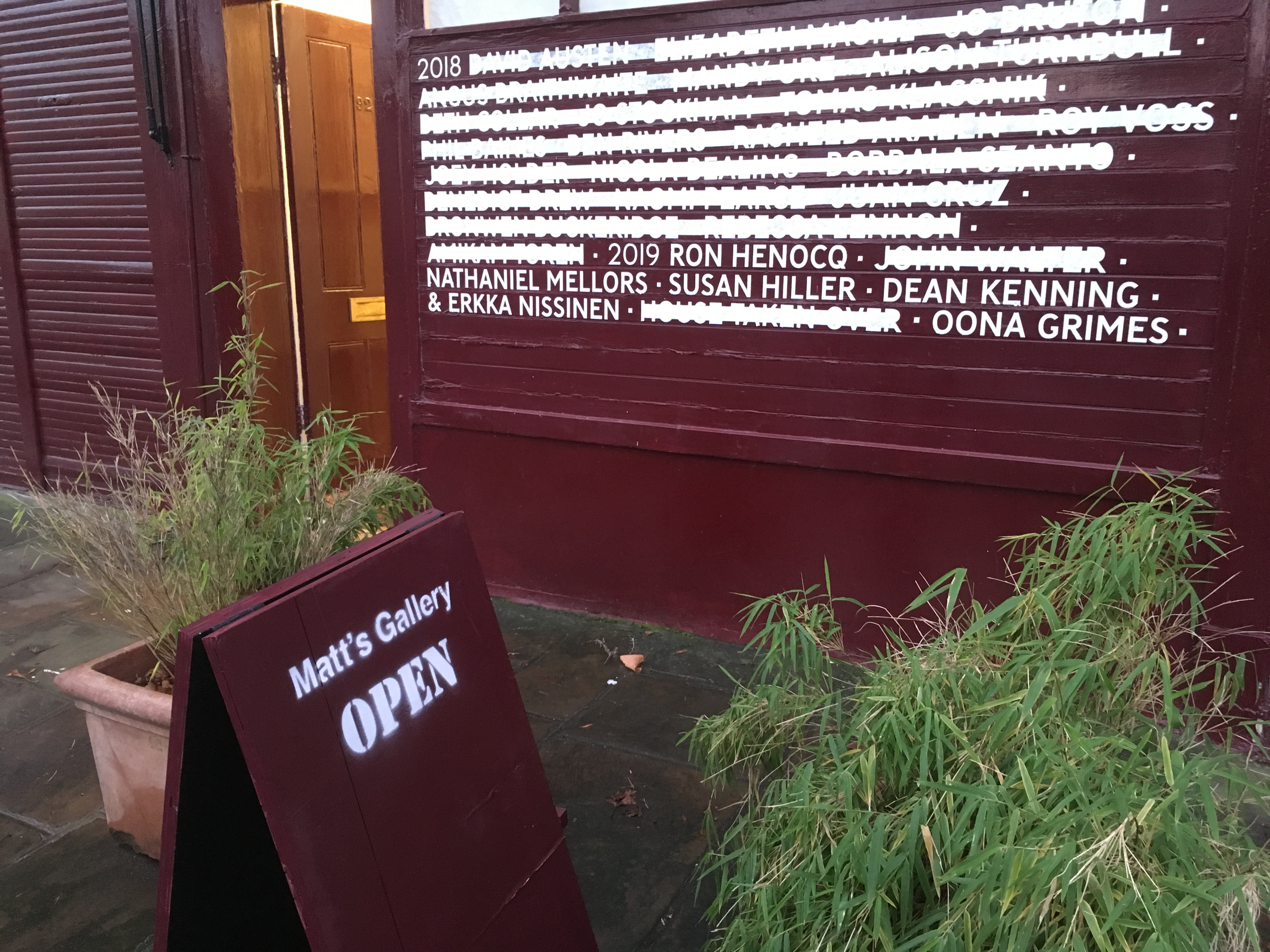
Matt's Gallery exterior, 92 Webster Road

Matt's Gallery is a contemporary art gallery currently located in Nine Elms at 6 Charles Clowes Walk, London, SW11 7AN. Its director, Robin Klassnik OBE, opened the gallery in 1979 on Martello Street, before moving premises to Copperfield Road, Mile End in 1993. In 2022 Matt's Gallery moved to Nine Elms, Battersea.

The gallery is named after Klassnik's dog, Matt E. Mulsion.

== History ==
The gallery opened in 1979 in, founder and director, Robin Klassnik's studio space on Martello Street. It moved to Copperfield Road, Mile End in 1993.

The first exhibition in 1979 was of conceptual artist, David Troostwyk.

Among the artists represented by Matt's Gallery are Willie Doherty, Susan Hiller, Richard Grayson, Graham Fagen, Nathaniel Mellors, Mike Nelson, Benedict Drew, Imogen Stidworthy and Lindsay Seers.

In 2022 Matt's Gallery moved to its new 6,000 square feet (560 m^{2}) permanent space in Nine Elms, Battersea as part of Wandsworth Council's cultural strategy.

== See also ==
- Art group
