= Suzanne Treister =

British artist

- Born: 1958; London, England
- Education: Saint Martin's School of Art; Chelsea College of Art and Design
- Known for: Conceptual art, Internet art, New media art
- Movement: Post-surveillance art
- Website: www.suzannetreister.net

Suzanne Treister (born 1958) is a British para-disciplinary contemporary artist based in London. Her works are known for being conceptually oriented around emerging technologies. An ongoing focus of her work is the relationship between new technologies, society, alternative belief systems and the potential futures of humanity.

== Career ==
Initially known in the 1980s as a painter, she became a pioneer in digital/new media art from the beginning of the 1990s, creating work about emerging technologies, developing fictional worlds and international collaborative organizations. Some of her early work is considered video game art. Among these early works was Fictional Videogame Stills / Would you recognise a Virtual Paradise? (1991–1992), a photographic series depicting an imaginary computer game. Treister created fictional game imagery on a computer screen and photographed the results, including scenes suggesting an underwater environment. Art critic Stewart Home discussed the series in a 2026 review of her retrospective at Modern Art Oxford, placing it within her transition from painting to computer-based art.

Treister works across multiple media, including video, drawing, and interactive technologies, exploring histories of cybernetics, surveillance, and counterculture.

In 1995 she created an alter ego, Rosalind Brodsky, a time travelling researcher from the 'Institute of Militronics and Advanced Time Interventionality'.

Treister's exhibition "Hexen 2.0" was shown at the PPOW Gallery in Chelsea, New York, in early 2013. Her work is held in private and public collections including Tate Britain; Science Museum, London; Centre Pompidou, Paris; Muzeum Sztuki, Łódź, Poland; and Thyssen-Bornemisza Art Contemporary, Vienna.

== Publications and works ==
- Rosalind Brodsky and the Satellites of Lvov. CD-ROM. [Place not identified]: S. Treister, c1998-2000.
- No Other Symptoms – Time Travelling with Rosalind Brodsky. CD-ROM with book. London: Black Dog Publishing, 1999.
- Hexen 2039 – new military-occult technologies for psychological warfare. London: Black Dog Publishing, 2006.
- NATO The Military Codification System for the Ordering of Everything in the World. London: Black Dog Publishing, 2008.
- It Is Almost That (box) (contributor). Los Angeles: Siglio, 2011.
- It is Almost That: A Collection of Image + Text Work by Women Artists & Writers (contributor). Los Angeles: Siglio, 2011.
- Hexen 2.0 Tarot. London: Black Dog Publishing, 2012.
- Hexen 2.0. London: Black Dog Publishing, 2012.
- HFT The Gardener. London: Black Dog Publishing, 2016.
- The Spaceships of Bordeaux / Les Vaisseaux De Bordeaux. Silvana Editoriale, Milan, Italy 2017
- From SURVIVOR (F) to The Escapist BHST (Black Hole Spacetime). Serpentine Galleries and Koenig Books, London Sept 2019
