= Black Dog Publishing =

British publishing company

- Parent company: St James’s House Media Group
- Founded: 1993
- Founder: Duncan McCorquodale
- Country of origin: United Kingdom
- Headquarters location: London
- Distribution: Marston Book Services (UK); Van Ditmar Boekenimport (Netherlands); Asia Publishers Services (China); APD Singapore (Southeast Asia); Peribo (Australia); Two Rivers Distribution (US and South America); UTP Distribution (Canada)
- Publication types: Books
- Nonfiction topics: Culture
- Official website: www.blackdogonline.com

Black Dog Publishing is a British publishing company specialising in illustrated non-fiction books on contemporary culture. Topics covered by Black Dog include architecture, art, craft, design, environment, fashion, film, music and photography.

== Details ==
The company was founded by Duncan McCorquodale in 1993. Its website claims it aspires to "take a daring, innovative approach to our titles". It has an emphasis on high production values.

Black Dog has published the Labels Unlimited and Edge Futures series, a series of books by Art on the Underground, the official London Eye book, and a book about the Riot Grrrl movement titled Riot Grrrl: Revolution Girl Style Now!, biographies of such figures as Charlemagne Palestine, Alvar Aalto, Colin St John Wilson, Tod Browning and Jean-Luc Godard. In 2007 Black Dog released Making Stuff for Kids, an instructional craft book for children, in collaboration with The Guardian newspaper.

Authors of Black Dog titles include Rob Young, Lydia Lunch, Bob and Roberta Smith, Carolee Schneemann, Phyllida Barlow, Beth Ditto, Peter Wollen, Suzanne Treister and Karen Knorr.

This company went into liquidation in January 2018 owing more than £700,000. The assets of Black Dog were acquired by St James’s House Media Group who now runs the company.
