= Jimmie Durham =

American sculptor, essayist, and poet (1940–2021)

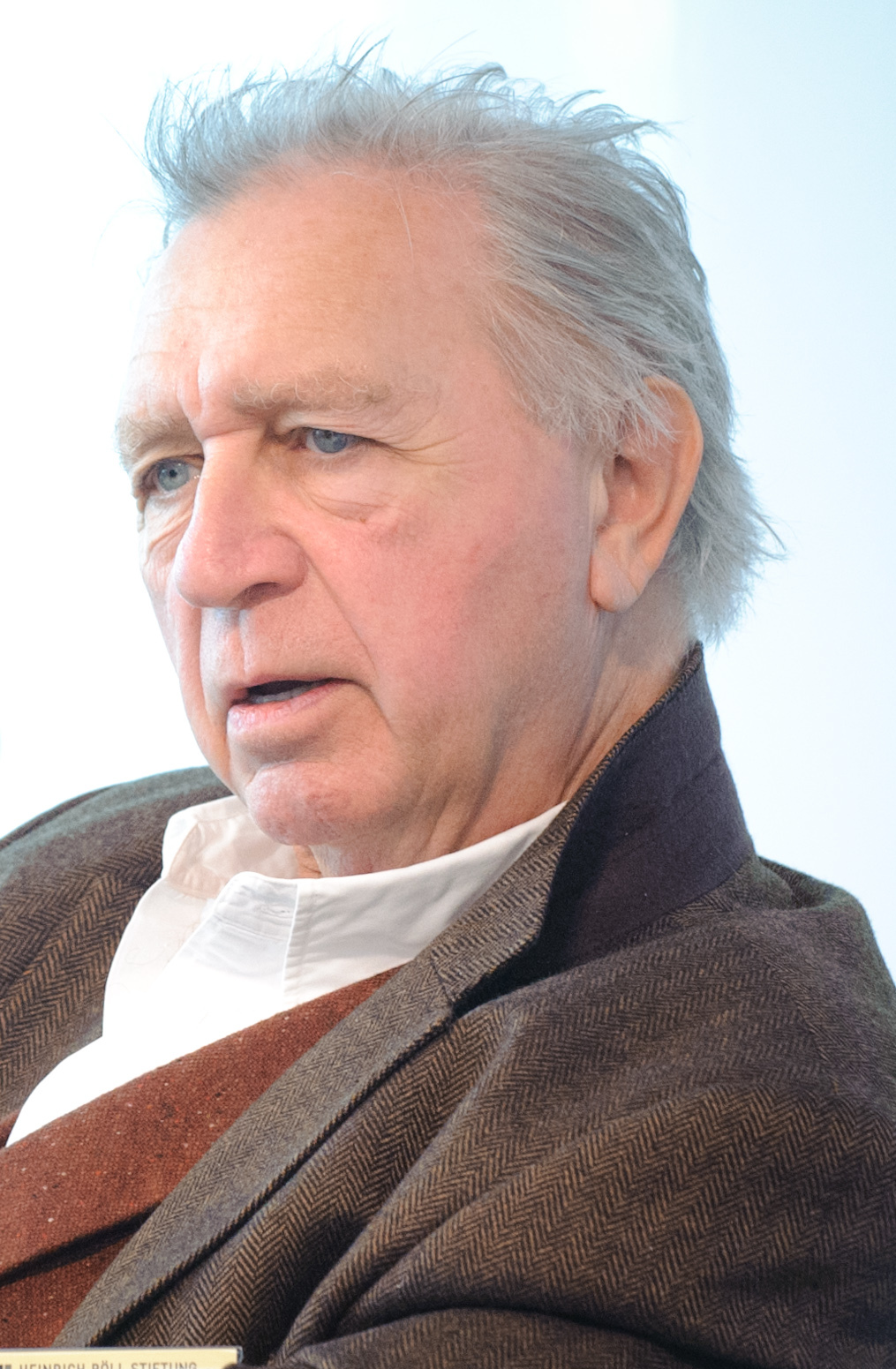
- Durham in 2012
- Born: Jimmie Bob Durham; July 10, 1940; Houston, Texas, US
- Died: November 17, 2021 (aged 81); Berlin, Germany
- Education: École des Beaux-Arts, Switzerland
- Known for: Sculpture, poetry, installation art
- Style: Postmodernism
- Partner: Maria Thereza Alves (?–2021; his death)

Jimmie Bob Durham (July 10, 1940 – November 17, 2021) was an American sculptor, essayist and poet. He was active in the United States in the civil rights movements of African Americans and Native Americans in the 1960s and 1970s, serving on the central council of the American Indian Movement (AIM). He returned to working at art while living in New York City. His work has been extensively exhibited. Durham also received the Günther-Peill-Preis (2003), the Foundation for Contemporary Arts Robert Rauschenberg Award (2017), and the 58th Venice Biennale's Golden Lion for lifetime achievement (2019).

He long claimed to be Cherokee but that claim has been denied by tribal representatives: "Durham is neither enrolled nor eligible for citizenship in any of the three federally-recognized and historical Cherokee Tribes: the Eastern Band of Cherokee Indians, the United Keetoowah Band of Cherokee Indians of Oklahoma, and the Cherokee Nation." He had "no known ties to any Cherokee community".

== Early life and education ==
Jimmie Durham was born on July 10, 1940, in Houston, Harris County, Texas, although he claimed he was born in Nevada County, Arkansas, or Washington, Hempstead County, Arkansas. His parents were Jerry Loren Durham and Ethel Pauline Simmons Durham, both born in Arkansas and buried in Texas.

In the 1960s Durham became active in theater, performance and literature related to the civil rights movement in the 1960s. In 1965 he moved to Austin, where he worked at the University of Texas at Austin and started exhibiting his work. His first solo exhibition in Austin was in 1965. In 1969 Durham moved to Geneva, Switzerland, where he studied at L'École des Beaux-Arts.

== Activism ==
In 1973, Durham returned to the United States and became involved with the American Indian Movement (AIM). From 1973 until 1980 he worked as a political organizer with AIM, becoming a member of the movement's Central Council and representing himself as Native American. Usually he claimed to be Cherokee and wrote on behalf of the organization.

In 1974, he attended International Indian Treaty Council (IITC) conference at the Standing Rock Indian Reservation. He later became chief administrator of the IITC and worked toward the United Nations granting the IITC status as a "Category II nongovernmental organization observer and consultant under the Economic and Social Council." Durham befriended Winona LaDuke (White Earth Ojibwe) and encouraged her activism. Paul Chaat Smith (Comanche) and Durham resigned from the IITC and AIM in 1979 over disagreements about AIM's support of Cuba and other Soviet allies.

== Art career ==
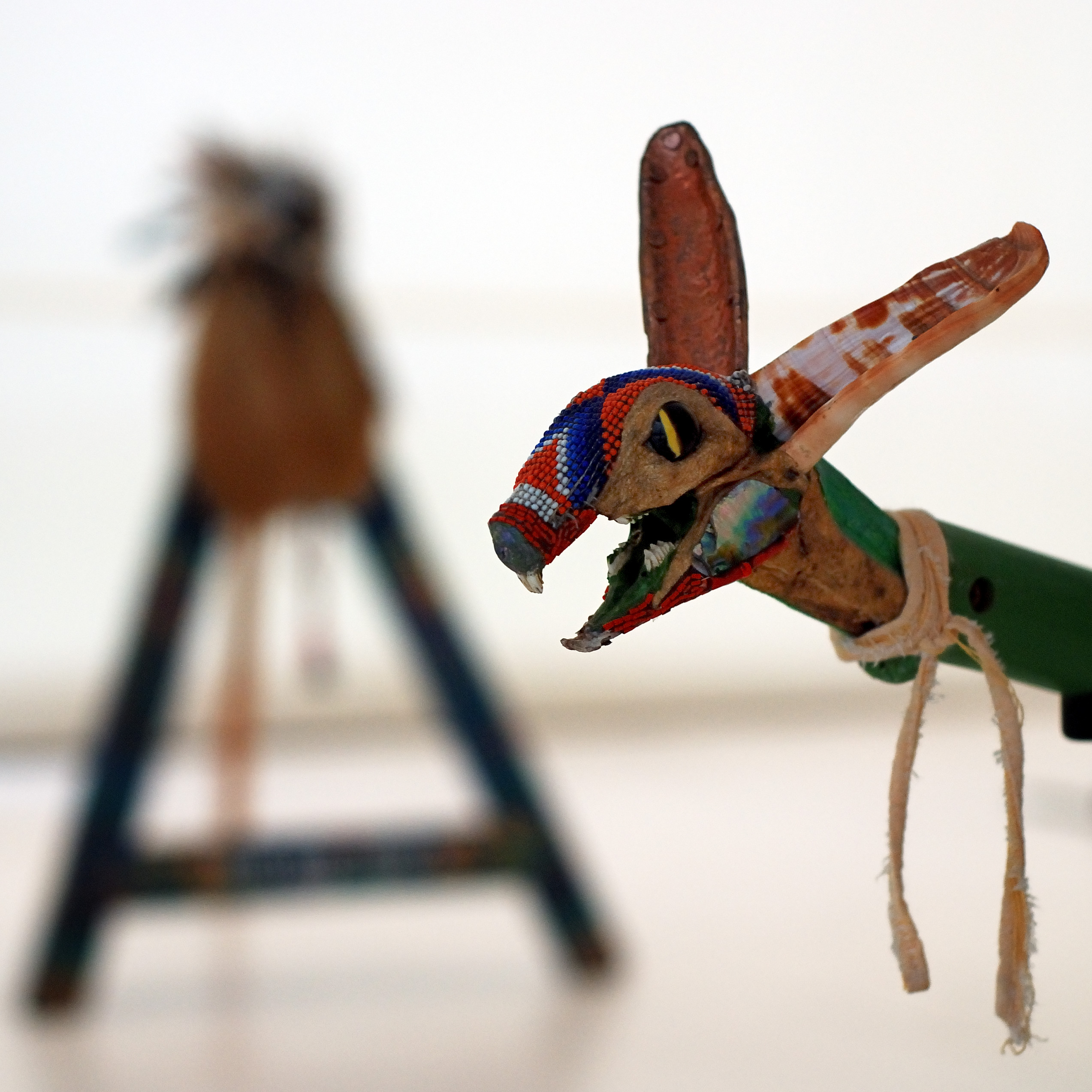
Sculpture by Jimmie Durham in Fundação de Serralves, 2007, in Porto, Portugal

After moving to New York City, Durham focused his attention to visual art. He created sculptures that challenged conventional representations of North American Indians. He exhibited and published essays frequently. From 1981 to 1983 he directed the Foundation for the Community of Artists in New York. In 1983 West End Press published Columbus Day, a book of his poems. His poetry was included in Harper's Anthology of 20th Century Native American Poetry (1988).

In 1987, Durham moved to Cuernavaca, Mexico. During his time in Mexico, Durham exhibited widely, including at the Whitney Biennial, documenta IX, Institute of Contemporary Arts, London; Exit Art, the Museum of Modern Art, Antwerp; and the Palais des Beaux-Arts, Brussels. He also published a number of essays in periodicals, including Art Forum, Art Journal (CAA), and Third Text. In 1993, a collection of his essays, A Certain Lack of Coherence, was published by Kala Press.

After several years in Mexico, Durham moved to Europe in 1994, initially relocating to Berlin and then Naples. Thereafter, he focused primarily on the relationship between architecture, monumentality, and national narratives. His anti-architectural sculptures, performances, and videos seek to liberate architecture's privileged material, stone, from its metaphorical associations with monumentality, stability and permanence. His exhibitions in Europe have included venues such as the Kunstverein in Hamburg, FRAC in Reims, Haus Wittgenstein in Vienna, Kunstverein München, and the Venice Biennale, among many others. He participated in A Grain of Dust A Drop of Water: The 5th Gwangju Biennale in 2004. In 2005 Durham co-curated with Richard William Hill The American West, an attack on cowboy and Indian mythology, at Compton Verney, United Kingdom. In 2006 he also had various works displayed at the Serralves Foundation, in Porto, Portugal. In 2009, a permanent public art piece by Durham, Serpentine rouge, was installed in Indre, France, along the Loire River. In 2010 Durham presented his Rocks Encouraged in the Portikus exhibition hall in Frankfurt am Main, Germany. In 2016 he was awarded the Goslarer Kaiserring.

In 1995 Phaidon Press published Jimmie Durham, a comprehensive survey of his art, with contributions by Laura Mulvey, Dirk Snauwaert, and Mark Alice Durant.

In 2003, a retrospective of his work, titled From the West Pacific to the East Atlantic, was shown at MAC in Marseille, France, and at GEM in The Hague, The Netherlands.

In 2009, Durham had a retrospective titled Pierre Rejetées... at Musée d'Art Moderne de la Ville de Paris in Paris, France.

In 2012, another retrospective, A Matter of Life and Death and Singing, curated by Bart De Baere and Anders Kreuger, was shown at MuHKA in Antwerp, Belgium.

In 2017 the retrospective Jimmie Durham: At the Center of the World, curated by Anne Ellegood, opened at the Hammer Museum in Los Angeles and traveled to the Walker Art Center in Minneapolis, the Whitney Museum of American Art in New York City, and Remai Modern in Saskatoon. The retrospective reignited debate about Durham's claims of Cherokee ancestry.

== Claims of Cherokee identity ==
Durham claimed to be "Wolf Clan Cherokee". He claimed to be quarter-blood Cherokee and to have grown up in a Cherokee-speaking community. He was raised in Texas, Louisiana, and Oklahoma, as his father traveled looking for work. According to Cherokee lawyer, justice and law professor Steve Russell, Durham was among the "professional posers" who masquerade as Cherokee and Native American for the purposes of career advancement. Durham is described as having "made a career of being Cherokee with no known ties to any Cherokee community, although he has claimed to be Wolf Clan and to have been raised with Cherokee as a first language."

In June 2017, ten Cherokee tribal representatives, artists, and scholars published an open letter about Durham, titled, "Dear Unsuspecting Public, Jimmie Durham Is a Trickster – Jimmie Durham's indigenous identity has always been a fabrication and remains one":

Durham is neither enrolled nor eligible for citizenship in any of the three federally-recognized and historical Cherokee Tribes: the Eastern Band of Cherokee Indians, the United Keetoowah Band of Cherokee Indians of Oklahoma, and the Cherokee Nation. These false claims are harmful as they misrepresent Native people, undermine tribal sovereignty, and trivialize the important work by legitimate Native artists and cultural leaders.

They went on to state that by claiming to exhibit his work as a Cherokee person, Durham is in violation of the Indian Arts and Crafts Act.

Some institutions hosted events to discuss these issues, such as the Walker Art Center in Minneapolis and the Whitney Museum of American Art in New York City.

== Death ==
Durham died on November 17, 2021, in Berlin, Germany, at the age of 81. He was survived by his partner, artist Maria Thereza Alves.

== Bibliography ==
- Durham, Jimmie. (1983) Columbus Day. Albuquerque, New Mexico: West End Press.
- Durham, Jimmie. (1992) "Geronimo!", in Partial Recall: Photos of Native North Americans. Lucy R. Lippard, ed. New York: The New Press. pp. 55–58.
- Durham, Jimmie. (1993) A Certain Lack of Coherence: Writings on Art and Cultural Politics. Jean Fisher (ed.), London: Kala Press.
- Durham, Jimmie. (1993) Jimmie Durham: My Book, The East London Coelacanth. London: ICA Book Works.
- Durham, Jimmie. (1994) "A friend of mine said that Art is a European Invention", in Global Visions, Toward a New Internationalism in the Visual Arts, London: Kala Press.
- Durham, Jimmie. (1994) "Jimmie Durham: Interviewed by Mark Gisbourne", Art Monthly February. 173. pp. 7–11.
- Durham, Jimmie. (1995) "Attending to Words and Bones: An Interview with Jean Fisher", Art and Design. vol. 10, nos. pp. 7–8. 47–55.
- Durham, Jimmie. (1996) Eurasian Project, Stage One: La Porte de l'Europe (Les Bourgeois de Calais, La Leon d'Anatomie. A Progress Report). Champagne-Ardenne, Calais, Anvers: Le College Editions, Galerie de l'Ancienne Poste, Galerie Micheline Szwajcer.
- Durham, Jimmie. (1996) Der Verführer und der Steinerne Gast. Vienna: Springer Verlag.
- Durham, Jimmie. (1998) Jimmie Durham: Between the Furniture and the Building (Between a Rock and a Hard Place). Munich: Kunstverein München.
- Durham, Jimmie. (1998) "The Centre of the World is Several Places (Parts I & II)." Interview by Beverly Koski and Richard William Hill (Berlin, February 1998). FUSE Magazine vol. 21, nos. 3 & 4, 1998. pp. 24–33 & 46–53, respectively.
- Durham, Jimmie. (2001) Stone Heart. Kitakyushu, Japan: Centre for Contemporary Art, Kitakyushu.
- Durham, Jimmie. (2001) "Belief in Europe", in S. Hassan & I. Dadi (eds.). Unpacking Europe. Rotterdam: Museum Boijmans Van Beuningen/Nai Publishers, pp. 290–293.
- Durham, Jimmie. (2004) "Situations", in C. Doherty (ed.). Contemporary Art: from Studio to Situation. London: Black Dog Publishing, pp. 177–183.
- Durham, Jimmie. (2004) "Stones Rejected by the Builder", in G. Di Pietrantonio, et al.. Jimmie Durham. Milan: Charta, Fondazione Antonio Ratti, pp. 117–130.
- Durham, Jimmie. (2005) The Second Particle Wave Theory. As Performed on the Banks of the River Wear, a Stone's Throw from S'Underland and the Durham Cathedral. Sunderland, UK/ Banff: University of Sunderland/Walter Phillips Gallery.
- Durham, Jimmie. (2005) "Various Element of Cowboy Life" & "Cherokee-US Relations", in The American West. Compton Verney, Warwickshire: Compton Verney House Trust. pp. 9–22 & 51–59 respectively.
- Durham, Jimmie. (2011) Amoxohtli/Libro de Carretera/A Road Book. Köln: Walther König.
- Durham, Jimmie. (2012) Poems that do not go together. Berlin, London: Wiens Verlag and Edition Hansjörg Mayer.
- Durham, Jimmie. (2013) "Vandalismo", in Forumdoc 2013.
- Durham, Jimmie; Fisher, Jean, eds. (2014). Waiting to be interrupted, selected writings 1993–2012. Milan: Mousse Publishing. ISBN 9788867491209.
- Durham, Jimmie. (2016) Sound and Silliness. Rome: Produzioni Nero.

== See also ==
- Jean Fisher
- Roxanne Dunbar-Ortiz
- Ward Churchill
