= Mike Nelson (artist) =

British artist

Michael Nelson
- Born: 20 August 1967 (age 59); Loughborough, England
- Education: Chelsea College of Art
- Known for: Installation art

Michael Nelson RA (born 20 August 1967) is a contemporary British installation artist. He represented Britain at the 54th Venice Biennale in 2011. Nelson has twice been nominated for the Turner Prize: first in 2001 (that year the prize was won by Martin Creed), and again in 2007 (when the winner was Mark Wallinger).

== Education ==
Nelson studied at University of Reading from 1986–1990 for a BA Fine Art. From 1992 to 1993 he studied at Chelsea College of Art and Design for an MA Sculpture.

== Working practice ==
Nelson's installations always only exist for the time period of the exhibition which they were made for. They are extended labyrinths, which the viewer is free to find their own way through, and in which the locations of the exit and entrance are often difficult to determine. His "The Deliverance and the Patience" in a former brewery on the Giudecca was in the 2001 Venice Biennale. In September 2007, his exhibition A Psychic Vacuum was held in the old Essex Street Market, New York. Essays on Nelson's projects, '24A Orwell Street King's Cross Sydney' and 'The Deliverance and the Patience' have been written by artist/curator Richard Grayson.

His major installation The Coral Reef (2000), was on display at Tate Britain until the end of 2011. It consists of fifteen rooms and a warren of corridors. This work and its showing at Matt's Gallery earned him his 2001 Turner Prize nomination.

His piece Untitled (public sculpture for a redundant space) won the Royal Academy of Arts Wollaston Award in 2018, for most distinguished work in the Summer Exhibition.

In 2019, from March to October, he transformed the Duveen Galleries in Tate Britain with his new installation called 'The Asset Strippers', a collection of objects from post-war Britain that framed his childhood.

In 2023, Nelson was the subject of a major retrospective at the Hayward Gallery in London, titled Extinction Beckons. The exhibition brought together large-scale installations spanning three decades of his career, described by critics as “dense, disorienting environments” that highlighted his longstanding interest in marginal spaces and cultural detritus.

In 2025, Nelson presented **Humpty Dumpty: A Transient History of Mardin Earthworks – Low Rise** at the Fruitmarket Gallery in Edinburgh as part of the Edinburgh Art Festival. The expansive, three-space installation transformed the gallery—including its warehouse—into a hybrid studio and exhibition. It combined two bodies of work: photographs of Mardin, a city in Turkey captured during infrastructure overhaul, and documentation of the demolished Heygate Estate in South London.

His work has been collected by Hayward Gallery, British Council, Poju Zabludowicz, Tate, MAMCO and Moderna Museet .

== See also ==
- Turner Prize
- Young British Artists
- British art
