= Susan Hiller =

American/British conceptual artist (1940–2019)

- Hiller in 2006
- Born: March 7, 1940; Tallahassee, Florida, U.S.
- Died: January 28, 2019 (aged 78); London, England, UK
- Known for: Installation, video, photography, performance and writing.
- Notable work: Belshazzar's Feast (1983–84); The J. Street Project (2002–2005); Witness (2000)
- Website: susanhiller.org

Susan Hiller (March 7, 1940 – January 28, 2019) was a US-born, British conceptual artist who lived in London, United Kingdom. Her practice spanned a broad range of media, including installation, video, photography, painting, sculpture, performance, artist's books and writing. A key figure in British art across four decades, she was best known for her innovative large-scale multimedia installations, and for works that took as their subject matter aspects of culture that were overlooked, marginalised, or disregarded, including paranormal beliefs–an approach which she referred to as "paraconceptualism".

== Early life and education ==
Hiller was born in Tallahassee, Florida, on March 7, 1940, Susan Hiller was raised in and around Cleveland, Ohio. In 1950, her family moved to Coral Gables, Florida, where she attended Coral Gables Senior High School, graduating in 1957. She attended Smith College and received a B.A. in 1961. After spending a year in New York City studying photography, film, drawing and linguistics, Hiller went on to pursue post-graduate studies in anthropology at Tulane University in New Orleans with a National Science Foundation Fellowship, completing her Ph.D. in 1965.

After doing fieldwork in Mexico, Guatemala and Belize, with a grant from the Middle American Research Institute (1962–1965), Hiller became critical of academic anthropology; she did not want her research to be part of the "objectification of the contrariness of lived events [that was] destined to become another complicit thread woven into the fabric of "evidence" that would help anthropology become a science". It was during a slide lecture on African art that Hiller decided to become an artist. She felt art was "above all, irrational, mysterious, numinous … [she] decided [she] would become not an anthropologist but an artist: [she] would relinquish factuality for fantasy". This decision to begin an art practice was an effort, as the artist later recalled, to "find a way to be inside all my activities."

== Career and practice ==
Following a period where she lived in France, Wales, Morocco and India, Hiller settled in London in the late 1960s, developing a practice that was innovative for its time and included a variety of media and performance-based work. She later cited minimalism, Fluxus, aspects of Surrealism and her study of anthropology as major influences on her work, as well as aspects of feminism. In the early 1970s, Hiller created participatory "group investigations", including Pray/Prayer (1969), Dream Mapping (1974) and Street Ceremonies (1973). These works originated in her conviction that "art can function as a critique of existing culture and as a locus where futures not otherwise possible can begin to shape themselves."

Hiller's first exhibition was a group show at Gallery House in London in 1973 that she organised with her friends Barbara Ess and Carla Liss. There, she presented two works, one under her own name and one using the pseudonym "Ace Posible" (a pun on "es posible", Spanish for "make it possible"): Transformer, 1973, a floor-to-ceiling grid structure with tissue paper covered with the artist's marks, and Enquires, 1973, a slide show of facts collected from a British encyclopaedia that revealed the culturally partisan definitions in what was ostensibly an objective and equitable source of information.

After the mid-1970s, Hiller continued her engagement with minimalism. For the artwork entitled 10 Months (1977–79), she took photographs of her pregnant body and kept a journal documenting the subjective aspects of her pregnancy. The final work comprises ten gridded blocks of twenty-eight black and white photographs, each block corresponding to a lunar month. The images are accompanied by excerpts from her journal entries for the same period. These components are installed on the wall in a stepped pattern that descends from left to right. Lisa Tickner observed,

The sentimentality associated with images of pregnancy is set tartly on edge by the scrutiny of the woman/artist who is acted upon, but who also acts: who enjoys a precarious status as both the subject and the object of her work ... The echoes of landscape, the allusions to ripeness and fulfilment, are refused by the anxieties of the text, and by the methodical process of representation.

The work was considered controversial when first exhibited in London.

Throughout her career, Hiller became known for making use of everyday phenomena and cultural artefacts from our society that commonly were overlooked, denigrated, or marginalised Such cultural artefacts included postcards, dreams, Punch & Judy shows, reports of UFO sightings, reports of near-death experiences, horror movies, bedroom wallpapers, street signs, ceramics, and extinct languages. Using the techniques of collecting and cataloguing, presentation and display, she transformed these everyday pieces of ephemera into artworks that offer a means of exploring the inherent contradictions in our collective cultural life, as well as the individual and collective unconscious and subconscious. As an artist, she was interested in the areas of our cultural collective experience that are concerned with devalued or irrational experiences: the subconscious, the supernatural, the surreal, the mystical and the paranormal. She engaged with such experiences and phenomena which defy logical or rational explanation through the rational scientific techniques of taxonomy, collection, organization, description and comparison. She did not, however, apply systems of judgment to the work, refraining from ever categorising the experiences as "true" or "false", "fact" or "fiction".

Many of her works explore the liminality of certain phenomena, including the practice of automatic writing (Sisters of Menon, 1972/79; Homage to Gertrude Stein, 2010), near-death experiences (Clinic, 2004) and collective experiences of unconscious, subconscious and paranormal activity (Dream Mapping, 1974; Belshazzar's Feast, 1983–4; Dream Screens, 1996; PSI Girls, 1999; Witness, 2000). Borrowing strategies from Minimalism to apply a "rational" framework to these products of the unconscious, the artist mounted the work Sisters of Menon in four L-shaped frames that, when installed on the wall together with four individually framed pages of her own commentary, make a cruciform. Hiller also published Sisters of Menon as an artist's book. She insisted on blurring the boundaries between cultural definitions of "rational" and "irrational", at the same time reinstating the validity of the unconscious as a source of knowledge or truth.

Beginning in the 1980s, Hiller incorporated the use of audio and visual technology as a means of investigating these phenomena, allowing the visitor to "make visions from ambiguous aural and visual cues".

Hiller described her practice as "paraconceptual", a neologism that places her work between the conceptual and the paranormal. In describing Hiller's work, art historian Alexandra Kokoli notes that

Hiller's work unearths the repressed permeability ... of ... unstable yet prized constructs, such as rationality and consciousness, aesthetic value and artistic canons. Hiller refers to this precarious positioning of her oeuvre as 'paraconceptual,' just sideways of conceptualism and neighbouring the paranormal, a devalued site of culture where women and the feminine have been conversely privileged. In the hybrid field of 'paraconceptualism,' neither conceptualism nor the paranormal are left intact ... as ... the prefix 'para'- symbolizes the force of contamination through a proximity so great that it threatens the soundness of all boundaries.

Hiller died in London on January 28, 2019, from pancreatic cancer at the age of 78.

== Key works ==
- Conceptual Painting (1970–1984) - Existing canvas works by Hiller that were cut up and reassembled into painting "blocks", their surfaces transformed into volumes.
- Relics (begun 1972) - Hiller burned her earlier works and exhibited the ashes in vials and other scientific containers, as an act not of destruction but of transubstantiation. A new burning was carried out each year for the rest of her life.
- Enquiries/Inquiries (1973–5) - Two parallel slide-projector sequences featuring texts taken from British and American collections of facts. Also an artists' book.
- Dream Mapping (1974) - A "group investigation", in which participants slept in fairy rings in a field for three nights and produced dream maps each following morning.
- Dedicated to the Unknown Artists (1972–76) - An installation consisting of 14 panels featuring more than 300 "rough sea" postcards and charts analysing the cards' linguistic and visual features, along with an accompanying artist's book. Now part of the Tate Collection and considered a classic work of conceptual art, it was highly controversial at the time for blending the austerity of conceptualism with elements of romanticism and popular culture.
- 10 Months (1977–9) - Daily photographs charting Hiller's growing belly during her pregnancy, arranged into panels of 10 lunar months, accompanied by texts from Hiller's journal on ideas of pregnancy, subjecthood, and language.
- Sisters of Menon (1972/79) - 4 L-shaped panels, arranged in a cross shape, displaying pages of Hiller's automatic writing.
- Work in Progress (1980) - Earlier works on canvas whose weaves were unthreaded during a week-long performance at Matt's Gallery. The threads were then reworked into knotted, looped, and braided abstract shapes.
- Monument (1980–1) - An installation consisting of photographs of memorial plaques in Postman's Park, one for each year of Hiller's life, in front of which is a park bench where viewers can sit and listen on headphones to a mediation on notions of remembrance, representation and heroism.
- Midnight Self-Portraits (1982–7) - Prints enlarged from handworked photo booth images, taken at midnight, featuring automatic writing.
- Rough Seas (begun 1982) - Grids of images based on Hiller's collection of 'rough sea' postcards, exploring the relationship between painting and photography.
- Belshazzar's Feast (1983–4) - Based on newspaper reports of people experiencing visions or supernatural messages on their television sets, the video featured flickering flames to spark viewers' own capacity for reverie and pareidolia and was the first video installation to enter the Tate Collection.
- Magic Lantern (1987) - Installation consisting of slide projections of three overlapping circles of varying colours and sizes, with a soundtrack of chanting and excerpts of Raudive's EVP recordings.
- An Entertainment (1990) - 4-channel video installation based on Punch and Judy puppet shows.
- From the Freud Museum (1991–7) - Installation consisting of a vitrine containing 50 handmade boxes filled with numerous items collected by Hiller, as a commentary upon museological display and the creation of meaning.
- Dream Screens (1996) - Internet art work, commissioned and hosted by Dia Art Foundation, based on films whose titles include the word 'dream'.
- Wild Talents (1997) - 3-channel video installation featuring large projected excerpts from fictional movies about children with telekinetic powers, and a small television showing documentary footage of children who experience religious visions.
- PSI Girls (1999) - 5-channel video installation featuring large projected excerpts from Hollywood movies about girls with telekinetic powers, as a comment about the subversive threat of female desire and adolescent sexuality.
- Witness (2000) - a colossal audio-sculptural installation consisting of over 400 miniature loudspeakers playing reports of UFO sightings from around the world. An Artangel commission, it was originally sited in a derelict Methodist chapel on Golborne Road, London.
- The J. Street Project (2002–2005) - A documentation of every street sign in Germany that contains the word 'Juden' (Jew), the project consists of an installation of 303 photographs and accompanying maps, a video, and an artists' book. Named in 2019 by the Guardian newspaper as one of the best artworks of the 21st century.
- What Every Gardener Knows (2003) - a musical sound work for garden spaces based on the binary system of Mendelian genetic theory.
- Homages (begun 2003) - various bodies of work made in homage to canonical cultural figures–Joseph Beuys, Marcel Duchamp, Yves Klein, Gertrude Stein–which comment on the unacknowledged history of occult and esoteric belief within modernist thought.
- The Last Silent Movie (2007–2008) and Lost and Found (2016) - film installations collecting together examples of endangered or extinct languages as well as, in the latter film, examples of successfully revived languages.
- Die Gedanken sind frei (Thoughts are Free) (2012) - installation with a jukebox featuring a collection of 100 popular songs from history, the lyrics for which fill the surrounding walls, as a way of accessing socio-historical consciousness. Originally commissioned for Documenta 13.
- Channels (2013) - a vast audio-sculptural installation consisting of a wall of over 100 cathode-ray television sets, which tune in and out of the disembodied voices narrating accounts of near-death experiences.
- Resounding (2013) - widescreen video projection featuring voices describing sightings of unexplained visual phenomena, audio transcriptions of pulsars and plasma waves, static interference with traces from the Big Bang, and various other attempts to translate and represent encounters with mysterious phenomena.

== Artist's books ==
- Rough Sea, Gardner Arts Centre Gallery, University of Sussex, Brighton, 1976; 56 b/w illus. ISBN 0950490806
- Enquiries/Inquiries, Gardner Arts Centre Gallery, University of Sussex, Brighton, with The Arts Council of Great Britain 1979; texts as illus. ISBN 0950490822
- Sisters of Menon, Coracle Press for Gimpel Fils. London 1983; facsimile of handwritten texts and charts as illus. hand-painted board covers. ISBN 0906630029
- After the Freud Museum, Book Works, London, 1995. Reprinted 2000; 79 b/w illus. cover, text by Susan Hiller
- Witness, Artangel, London 2000; 21 b/w and col. illus.
- Split Hairs: The Art of Alfie West, self-published, Berlin, 2004, co-authored with David Coxhead, 9 col. illus.
- The J. Street Project 2002-2005, Compton Verney, Warwickshire, and Berlin 2005; 303 col. illus. Intro. by Susan Hiller, afterword by Jörg Heiser (text in English and German)
- Auras and Levitations, Institute of Contemporary Arts with Book Works, London, 2008; 70 b/w and col. illus., text by Susan Hiller.
- The Dream and the Word, London: Black Dog Publishing, 2012, 80 pp, text by Susan Hiller.

== Teaching, writing, and curatorial projects ==
Hiller was widely influential as a teacher for a younger generation of British artists and was named by the critic Louisa Buck as one of the key progenitors of the young British artists' movement that emerged in the UK in the 1990s. During the 1980s, she lectured at the Slade School of Fine Art, London. British artists who were taught by Hiller include Sonia Boyce, Zarina Bhimji, Tacita Dean, Douglas Gordon, and Jane and Louise Wilson.

Following her departure from the Slade, Hiller served as a Distinguished Visiting Professor of Fine Art at California State University, Long Beach in 1988; Visiting Arts Council Chair at UCLA, Los Angeles in 1991–92; Professor of Art at the University of Ulster, Belfast 1991–98; and Baltic Professor of Fine Art at the University of Newcastle 1999–2002.

Hiller was well known for her writing and lecturing about art. To date, two collections of texts by Hiller have been published, "Thinking About Art: Conversations with Susan Hiller" and "The Provisional Texture of Reality: Selected Talks and Texts 1977-2007".

In 1976, she co-authored with David Coxhead the art-historical book Dreams: Visions of the Night, about the representation of dreams and dreaming across a variety of cultures and artistic traditions.

In 1991, she edited the cross-disciplinary volume The Myth of Primitivism, deriving from a series of seminars she had organised at the Slade. Bringing together newly commissioned essays by a variety of artists, art historians and anthropologists–including Rasheed Areen, Guy Brett, Lynne Cooke, Jimmie Durham, Edgar Heap of Birds, and Signe Howell–it explored the fusion of myth, history and geography which leads to ideas of primitivism and looked at their construction, interpretation and consumption in Western culture.

In 2000, Hiller curated the Hayward Touring exhibition Dream Machines. Taking its title from the Dreamachine created by Brion Gysin and Ian Sommerville–who Hiller had got to know in the 1960s–the show reflected Hiller's longstanding interest in artworks designed to induce reverie and explore altered states of consciousness. Gathering together historical and contemporary artworks, the exhibition was largely responsible for reigniting interest in the Dreamachine amongst a new generation of British artists after a period of relative neglect. The exhibition was accompanied by a catalogue with texts by Hiller and Jean Fisher.

== Collections ==
Hiller's works are included in numerous international public and private collections, including the Tate Gallery, London; Museum of Modern Art, New York; Centre Pompidou, Paris; National Portrait Gallery, London; National Gallery of Art, Washington, D.C.; British Museum, London; Ludwig Museum, Cologne; Serralves Foundation, Porto; Colby College Museum of Art, Colby, Maine; Ella Fontanals Cisneros Foundation, Miami; Frac Bourgogne, Dijon; Henie–Onstad Kunstsenter, Oslo; Henry Moore Sculpture Collection, Leeds; Inhotim, Brumadhino, Brazil; Israel Museum, Jerusalem; Moderner Museet, Stockholm; National Gallery of Art South Australia, Adelaide; Rhode Island School of Design Museum, Providence, Rhode Island; Smith College Museum of Art, Northampton, Massachusetts; Tokyo Metropolitan Museum of Photography; Victoria and Albert Museum, London.

== Art fellowships and awards ==
- 1968 Karolyl Foundation, Vence, France (residency)
- 1969 Ministère des Beaux Arts, Morocco (residency)
- 1975 Artist in Residence, University of Sussex, Brighton (GB)
- 1976 Gulbenkenian Foundation]Visual Artist's Award (GB)
- 1977 Gulbenkenian Foundation Visual Artist's Award (GB)
- 1981 Greater London Arts Association Bursary (GB)
- 1982 Visual Arts Board Travelling Fellowship (Australia), National Foundation for the Arts Fellowship (USA)
- 1998 Guggenheim Fellowship in Visual Art Practice (USA)
- 2002 DAAD residency, Berlin, 2002–2003 (Germany)
- Kulturstifung des Bundes, Halle (Germany)
- Couvent des Recollets residency, Paris

== Selected catalogues and monographs ==
- Susan Hiller: Recent Works, essays by David Elliott, Susan Hiller, Caryn Faure Walker. Published on the occasion of the exhibitions at Kettle's Yard, Cambridge, 8 April 1978 – 30 April 1978, and Museum of Modern Art Oxford, 9 April 1978 – 14 May 1978.
- Susan Hiller 1973–83: The Muse My Sister, essays by Guy Brett, Rozsika Parker, John Roberts. Published by Orchard Gallery on the occasion of tripartite exhibitions at the Orchard Gallery, Derry, 10 March–17 April 1984; Gimpel Fils, London, 13 March–7 April 1984; Third Eye Centre, Glasgow, 17 March–14 April 1984.
- Susan Hiller: Out of Bounds, essay by Lucy Lippard. Published by ICA, on the occasion of the exhibition at the ICA, 22 October 1986 – 23 November 1986.
- Susan Hiller: The Revenants of Time, essay by Jean Fisher. Published on the occasion of exhibitions at Mappin Gallery, Sheffield, December 1990–January 1991; Matt's Gallery, London, 19 January 1991 – 31 January 1991; Third Eye Centre, Glasgow, 30 March 1991 – 27 April 1991.
- Susan Hiller, essays by Fiona Bradley, Guy Brett and Stuart Morgan. Published by Tate Publishing on the occasion of the exhibition at Tate Liverpool, 20 January 1996 – 17 March 1996.
- Susan Hiller: Lucid Dreams, essays by Guy Brett, Richard Grayson, Tim Guest and Denise Robinson. Published by Henie Onstad on the occasion of the exhibition at Henie Onstad, 9 January 1999 – 14 March 1999.
- Susan Hiller: Recall–Selected Works 1969-2004, edited by James Lingwood, essays by Rosemary Betterton, Guy Brett, Jean Fisher, Ian Hunt, Louise Milne, Denise Robinson and Stella Santacatterina. Published by BALTIC on the occasion of the exhibitions, at BALTIC, 1 May 2004 – 18 July 2004; Museu Serralves, 15 October 2004 – 9 January 2005; Kunsthalle Basel, 30 January 2005 – 27 March 2005.
- Susan Hiller, edited by Ann Gallagher, essays by Yve-Alain Bois, Guy Brett, Jorg Heiser, Alexandra Kokoli, Jan Verwoert. Published by Tate Publishing on the occasion of the exhibition at Tate Britain, 1 February 2011 – 15 May 2011.
- Susan Hiller: From Here to Eternity, essays by Richard Grayson, Jörg Heiser and Ellen Seifermann. Published by Verlag für moderne Kunst on the occasion of the exhibition at Kunsthalle Nürnberg, 10 December 2011 – 19 February 2012.
