= Electric Eden =

2011 book by Rob Young

- Author: Rob Young
- Language: English
- Subject: Folk & traditional music, music history and criticism
- Published: 2010 (Faber & Faber)
- Publication place: United Kingdom
- Pages: 672
- ISBN: 978-0-86547-856-5
- Dewey Decimal: 781.62
- LC Class: ML3650.Y68

Electric Eden: Unearthing Britain's Visionary Music is a 2010 book by Rob Young about the history of British folk music in the 1960s and 1970s. It is published by Faber & Faber.
