= Hila Peleg =

Israeli filmmaker (born 1976)

Hila Peleg הילה פלג
- Born: Hila Peleg; 1976
- Education: Goldsmiths, University of London
- Known for: dean, curator, filmmaker
- Notable work: Berlin Documentary Forum

Hila Peleg (Hebrew: הילה פלג; born 1976 in Tel Aviv-Yafo, Israel) is an international curator and filmmaker and the Dean of HaMidrasha – Faculty of the Arts starting September 2023. Peleg has curated solo shows, large-scale group exhibitions and interdisciplinary cultural events across the visual arts, film and architecture, in public institutions throughout Europe and internationally. She is also known for her documentary film work including her award winning feature film "A Crime Against Art" from 2007 and "Sign Space" from 2016.

== Biography ==
Hila Peleg has curated numerous interdisciplinary projects and exhibitions for institutions including those for KW Institute for Contemporary Art (Berlin), Iniva - Institute of International Visual Arts (London), Haus der Kulturen der Welt (Berlin), and Centre Pompidou (Paris). In 2010 she founded the Berlin Documentary Forum, a biennial event initiated at Haus der Kulturen der Welt devoted to the production and presentation of contemporary and historical documentary practices in an interdisciplinary context. She was the artistic director of the Berlin Documentary Forum until 2014. Peleg was co-curator of Manifesta 7 (Trentino-Alto Adige/Südtirol, 2008) and curator of the film program at the 10th Shanghai Biennale (2014). Recently she was a curator of Documenta 14 (Athens and Kassel, 2017), with a focus on the film programs and the large-scale moving image installations in both Athens and Kassel. She also conceived Documenta’s year-long weekly film program KEIMENA that was running on Greece's public television channel ERT.

Peleg’s feature films - A Crime Against Art (100 min., 2007, Spain / Germany), and Sign Space (77 min., 2016, Germany) - are observation-based documentaries that engage with the conventions and debates that inform the institutional space of art.

Peleg is the co-editor of the book “Documentary Across Disciplines”, The MIT Press, Cambridge, MA and London, HKW, Berlin, 2016

She was appointed Dean of HaMidrasha – Faculty of the Arts in September 2023

== Notable curatorial projects ==
Rough Cuts and Outtakes: Gordon Matta-Clark selected by Hila Peleg. Canadian Centre for Architecture, Montreal, 2019-2020.

Roee Rosen: "Histoires dans la pénombre". Musée nationale d’art moderne / Centre Pompidou, Paris, 2018.

KEIMENA: A Documenta 14 Film Program on ERT2. Hellenic Broadcasting Corporation, Greece, 2016-2017.

TV Politics: A Documenta 14 film program in Kassel with Alberto Grifi, Isuma Productions, Sarah Maldoror, Alanis Obomsawin, Nagisa Oshima, and Mohamed Soueid. Kassel, 2017.

Wohnungsfrage: Exhibition, Publications, Academy. A collaboration between Hila Peleg, Jesko Fezer, Nikolaus Hirsch and Wilfried Kuehn. HKW, Berlin, 2017.

Ape Culture: A group exhibition with Lene Berg, Marcus Coates, Anja Dornieden & Juan David González Monroy, Ines Doujak, Coco Fusco, Jos de Gruyter & Harald Thys, Pierre Huyghe, Louise Lawler, Damián Ortega, Nagisa Ōshima, Erik Steinbrecher, Rosemarie Trockel, Klaus Weber, and Frederick Wiseman. A collaboration between Hila Peleg and Anselm Franke. HKW, Berlin, 2015.

Berlin Documentary Forum: New Practices Across Disciplines, HKW, Berlin, 2010 - 2014. The biannual festival Berlin Documentary Forum had three editions, the program of events included innumerable contributions by international artists and scholars such as Basma Alsharif, Maria Thereza Alves, Shaina Anand, Ayreen Anastas, Ariella Azoulay, Christa Blümlinger, Stella Bruzzi, Tony Cokes, Beatriz Colomina, Catherine David, Jimmie Durham, Okwui Enwezor, Harun Farocki, Omer Fast, Hassan Khan, Joachim Koester, Xavier Le Roy, Sylvère Lotringer, Chris Marker, Angela Melitopoulos, Marie-José Mondzain, Rabih Mroué, Adrian Rifkin, Ben Russell, Eszter Salamon, Ella Shohat, Eyal Sivan, Hito Steyerl.

== Filmography ==
Sign Space, Germany, 2016, 70 minutes. Premiered at the 66th Berlinale, Berlin international Film Festival, 2016

A Crime Against Art, Germany / Spain, 2007, 100 minutes. Premiered at the 58th Berlinale international Berlin Film Festival. Received the 'New Vision Award’, CPH:DOX Copenhagen International Documentary Festival, 2007.

== Editorial Work ==
Documentary Across Disciplines, Editors: Erika Balsom, Hila Peleg. The MIT Press, Cambridge, MA and London / Haus der Kulturen der Welt, Berlin, 2016

Wohnungsfrage. Series of 11 books. Editors: Jesko Fezer, Christian Hiller, Nikolaus Hirsch, Wilfried Kuehn, Hila Peleg. Spector Books / Haus der Kulturen der Welt, Berlin, 2015

Ape Culture / Kultur der Affen. Editors: Anselm Franke, Hila Peleg. Spector Books / Haus der Kulturen der Welt, Berlin, 2015

== See also ==
- Berlin Documentary Forum
- Documenta 14
