= Roee Rosen =

Israeli multidisciplinary artist, writer and filmmaker

Roee Rosen רוֹעי רוֹזֵן
- Born: 1963 (age 62–63); Rehovot, Israel
- Education: Tel Aviv University, School of Visual Arts, Hunter College

Roee Rosen (Hebrew: רועי רוֹזֵן; born 1963) is an Israeli multidisciplinary artist, writer and filmmaker.

== Biography ==
Roee Rosen (born 1963 in Rehovot) studied philosophy and comparative literature studies in Tel Aviv University until 1984 and graduated with BFA from School of Visual Arts, New York in 1989. Rosen received MFA from Hunter College in New York in 1991.

He is a professor at HaMidrasha – Faculty of the Arts, Beit Berl College in Kfar-Saba and at the Bezalel Academy of Arts and Design in Jerusalem.

His work has been described by Hila Peleg for Documenta 14 (2017) as creating " ... an artistic universe that treacherously undermines the normative implications of identities and identifications through fictionalization, irony, and revision. In untold variations, he typically links current Israeli and world politics with mythical and political references to European and Jewish history. Using a vast array of fictional characters and iconographic motifs and codes, Rosen frequently refers to, and transforms, not only the canon of the historical avant-garde and transgressive traditions from the Marquis de Sade to Georges Bataille, but also popular media, political propaganda, and classic children's fairy tales."

== Fictive characters ==
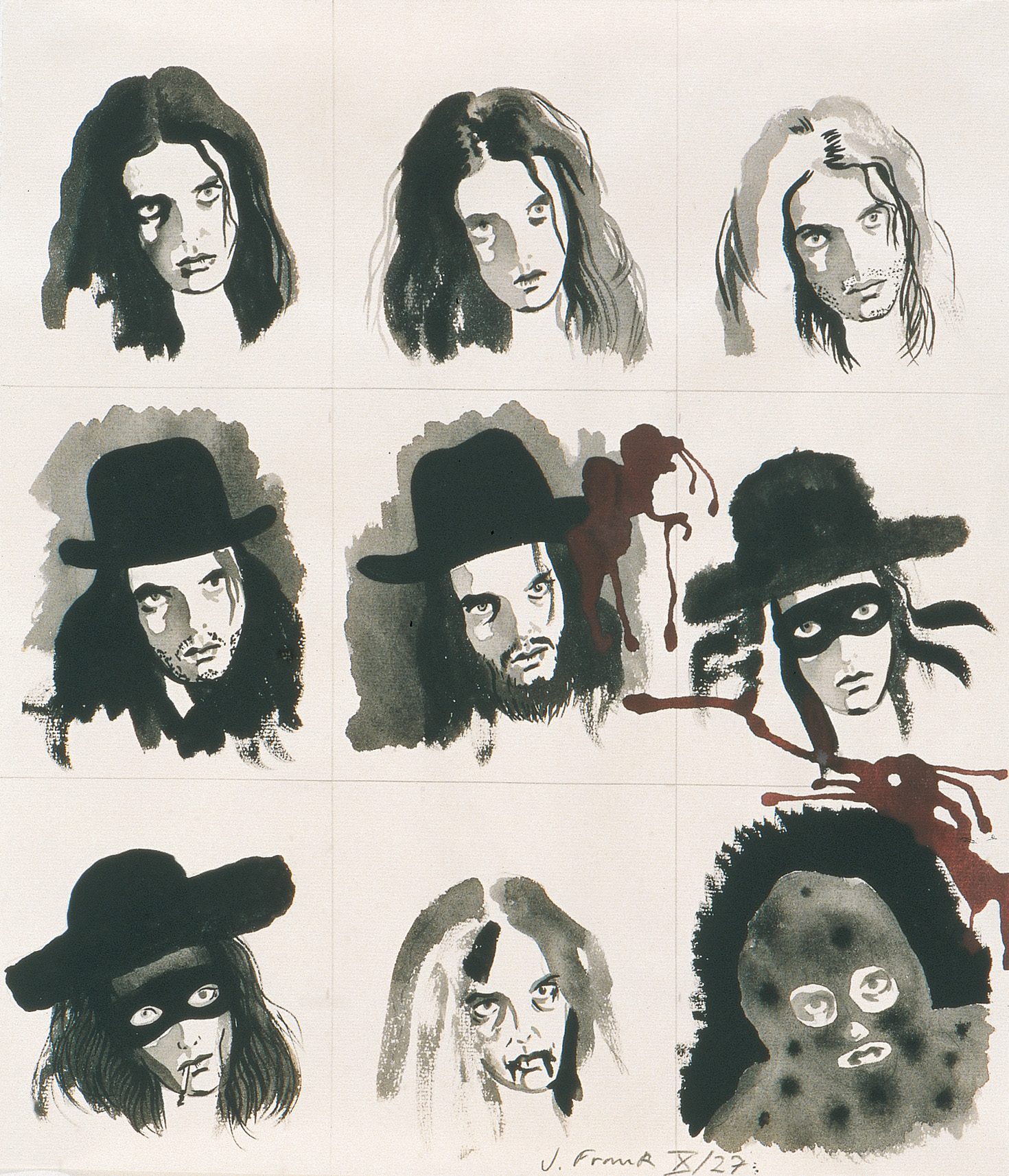
Justine Frank [aka Roee Rosen], disguised self-portraits from The Stained Portfolio, 1927

As part of his art, Rosen invented non existing artists. His first virtual artist was Justine Frank (1900–1943), a Jewish-Belgian surrealist painter who also authored the pornographic novel "Sweet Sweat." In both art and writings Frank combined explicit erotic imagery with Jewish tropes and magical elements, thus assuming a highly polemic and disturbing position. She later worked in Palestine despite appearing to be antagonistic to Zionism and refusing to speak Hebrew. The fabrication of the project entailed a book combining Frank's own novel with her biography and a theoretical essay, entitled Sweet Sweat (Sternberg Press, 2009). A retrospective of Frank's works was first shown in 2004. In the short film "Two Women and a Man" (2005), Roee Rose himself appears in drag as Joanna Führer-Hasfari, a scholar of Frank's work, and uses this guise to attack himself for appropriating Frank's legacy.

Rosen's second major fictional artist is Maxim Komar-Myshkin (1978–2011), a pseudonym for Russian emigrant poet and painter Efim Poplavsky, born in 1978 and immigrated to Israel in 2003. Komar-Myshkin established the "Buried Alive" collective, a group of Ex-Soviet artists who disavowed the culture surrounding them, describing themselves as "Russian cultural zombies." The project thus entailed fabricating the work of the collective as well as that of Poplavsky. Komar-Myshkin, according to the story, suffered acute paranoia and believed he is persecuted by Vladimir Putin. In his major work, the album "Vladimir's Night." he takes his revenge on the Russian president. Produced in secrecy and supposedly discovered after the artist's death, it describes still objects assuming life so as to murder Vladimir. The second part of the book offers annotation by yet another fictive character, Rosa Chabanova, a hybrid of fiction, political writings and theory.

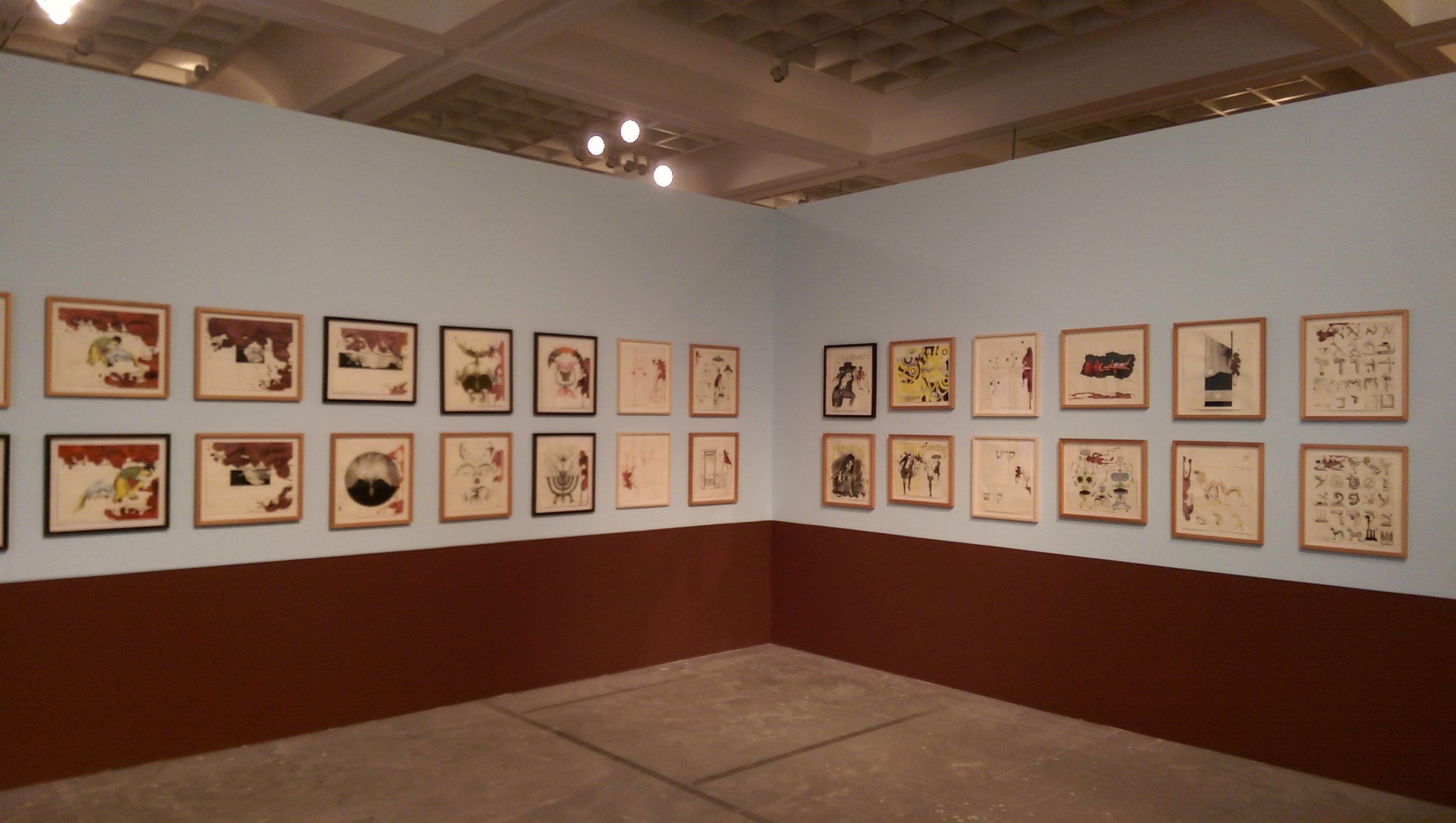
Justine Frank room in: Roee Rosen, A Group Exhibition (2016), Tel Aviv Museum of Art

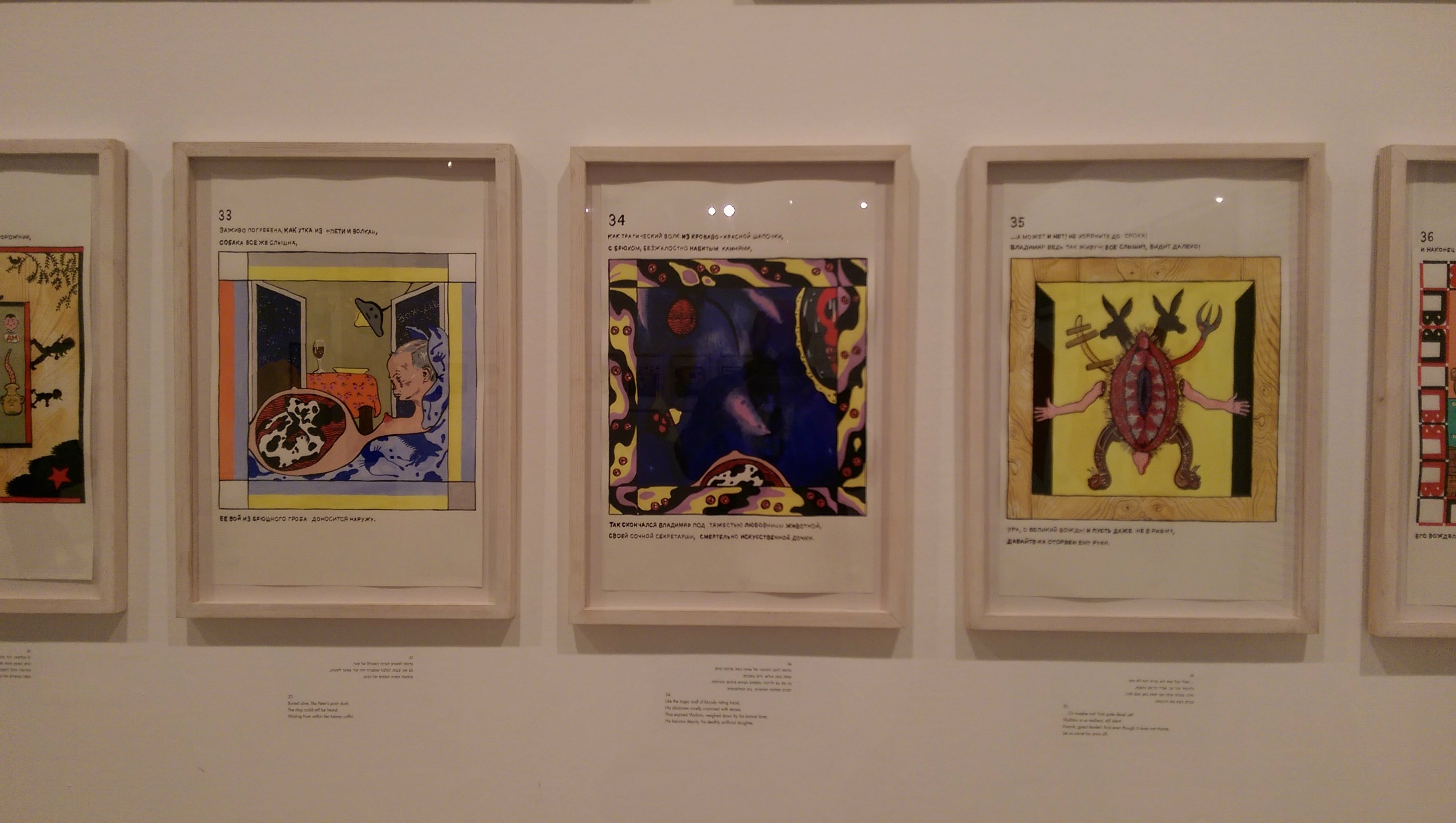
Maxim Komar-Myshkin, Vladimir's Night, installed in: Roee Rosen, A Group Exhibition (2016), Tel Aviv Museum of Art

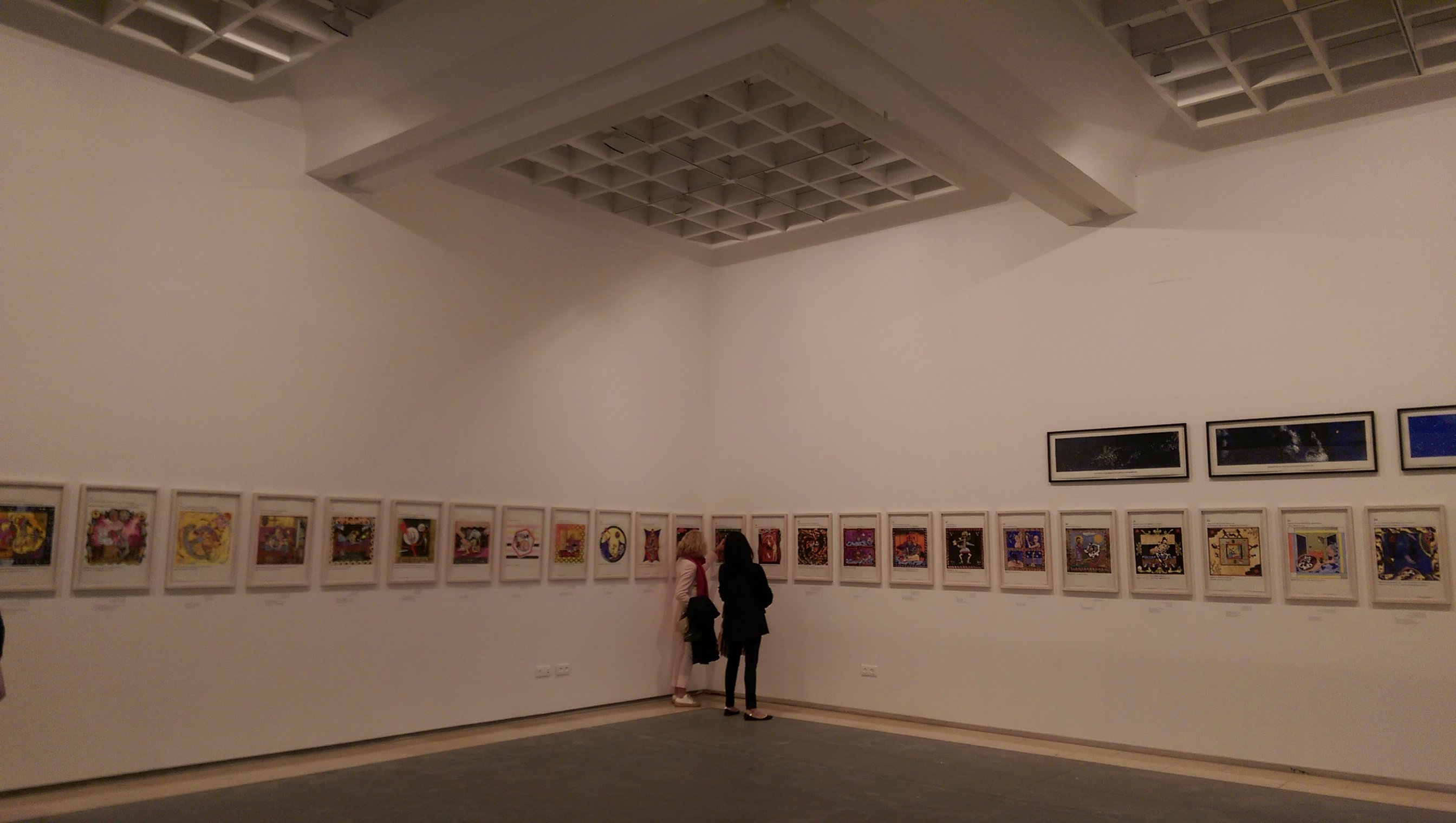
Maxim Komar-Myshkin, Vladimir's Night, installed in: Roee Rosen, A Group Exhibition (2016), Tel Aviv Museum of Art

== Exhibitions ==
=== Solo exhibitions ===
- 2022–2023, Kafka for Kids and Other Troubling Tales, Kunstmuseum Luzern (curators: Fanni Fetzer and Sergio Edelzstein)
- 2019–2020, Roee Rosen, The Mosquito-Mouse and Other Hybrids, Kunsthal Charlottenborg, Copenhagen (curator: Anne Mikél Jensen).
- 2019, Roee Rosen, "Exorcisms, Project Arts Centre," Dublin (curator: Livia Paldi).
- 2018, "Roee Rosen – Histoires dans le pénombre" (Stories in the Dark), an expansive exhibition at Centre Pompidou, Paris, was curated by Catherine David and Hila Peleg. The exhibition featured Rosen's early artist book, "The Blind Merchant" (1989–1991), a complex retelling of "The Merchant of Venice," another artist book, "Vladimir's Night" (2011–2014) by his fictive artist Maxim Komar-Myshkin (as well as videos by the fictive collective "The Buried Alive Group), and Rosen's film "The Dust Channel" (2016). The exhibition also included "Roee Rosen: Douce Sueur," a retrospective screening program of Rosen's film in collaboration with Jeu de paume.
- 2016 Roee Rosen – A Group Exhibition, the Tel Aviv Museum of Art in 2016, curated by Gilad Melzer and Joshua Simon. The exhibition featured Rosen's different personae as well as his films and books. Also in 2016 Rosen held a survey exhibition entitled "Live and Die as Eva Braun and Other Intimate Stories", at the Edith Russ Haus in Oldenburg, Germany. Rosen's installation "Live and Die as Eva Braun" was first exhibited at the Israel Museum in Jerusalem (1997), where it caused controversy, concerning the representation of the holocaust.
- 2012, Vile, Evil Veil, INIVA Institute of International Visual Arts, London.
- 2011, The Dynamic Dead Roee Rosen, Ujazdowski Castle Center for Contemporary Art in Warsaw. Curated by Stach Szabłowski, this was the first retrospective of the artist.
- 2009, Justine Frank, a Retrospective, Extra-City, Antwerp. Curated by Hila Peleg.
- 1997, Live and Die as Eva Braun, The Israel Museum, Jerusalem.

Several retrospective screenings programs were dedicated to Roee Rosen's cinematic production, amongst them at the FICUNAM International Film Festival, Mexico City (2018), MUMOK, Vienna (2014), La Roche Sur Yon International Film Festival (2013), and the Oberhausen International Short Film Festival (2012).

Rosen also held numerous one person exhibitions in Rosenfeld Gallery in Tel Aviv, The Herzliya Museum of Contemporary Art, and other venues.

=== Group exhibitions ===
Documenta 14, 2017 in Athens and Kassel. Vos désirs sont les nôtres, Le Friche, Marseille (2018). AV Festival in Newcastle upon Tyne, 2016 "Gender in art" in Museum of Contemporary Art in Kraków, Monday Begins on Saturday, The First Edition of the Bergen Assembly, Bergen, Norway. Taipei Biennial, Taiwan, 2012, "Animism" at Haus der Kulturen der Welt in Berlin, "Host & Guest," the Tel Aviv Museum of Art, "Cargo-Cult" in Bat Yam Museum of Art. Manifesta 7, 2007, Trento, Italy.

== Films ==
Films by Rosen include:

- Two Women and a Man, 2005, 17 minutes. Rosen himself appears as a female scholar to discuss the work of Justine Frank, and to critically assault himself. The film premiered at Oberhausen International Short Film Festival, where it won a special mention.
- The Confessions of Roee Rosen, 2008, 57 minutes. Rosen's "confessions" are delivered by three surrogates: illegal female labor migrants. They speak in Hebrew without understanding the language by reading a transliteration of the text. The film is also a musical, with the music performed by an ensemble made excludively of women musician. The film premiered at FID Marseille, where it won a special mention.
- Tse (Out), 2010, 34 minutes. The central scene is a BDSM session wherein the submissive responds to the pain by emitting sentence, which are all quotes from the right-wing politician Avigdor Lieberman, then Israel's minister of foreign affairs. An erotic exchange is thus set as a political exorcism. The film premiered at the Venice Film Festival, where it won the Orizzonti award for best medium-length film. It went on to receive numerous other awards.
- The Buried Alive Videos, 2013, 36 minutes. The film is, supposedly, a compilation of six shorts produced over a span of a decade by The Buried Alive Collective. The film premiered at the Rome International Film Festival. Among other awards it won the best film award at the Bucharest International Experimental Film Festival.
- The Dust Channel, 2016, 23 minutes. Structured as an operetta, the film juxtaposes a libretto in Russian that tells the story of a DC07 vacuum cleaner and its maker, James Dyson, with a portrayal of an affluent household where all seem to be erotically obsessed with home appliances and dirt. This narrative gradually leads into a more documentary layer dealing with "Holot," a detention facility where refuge-seekers were held in Israel. The film was co-produced and exhibited by Documenta 14.

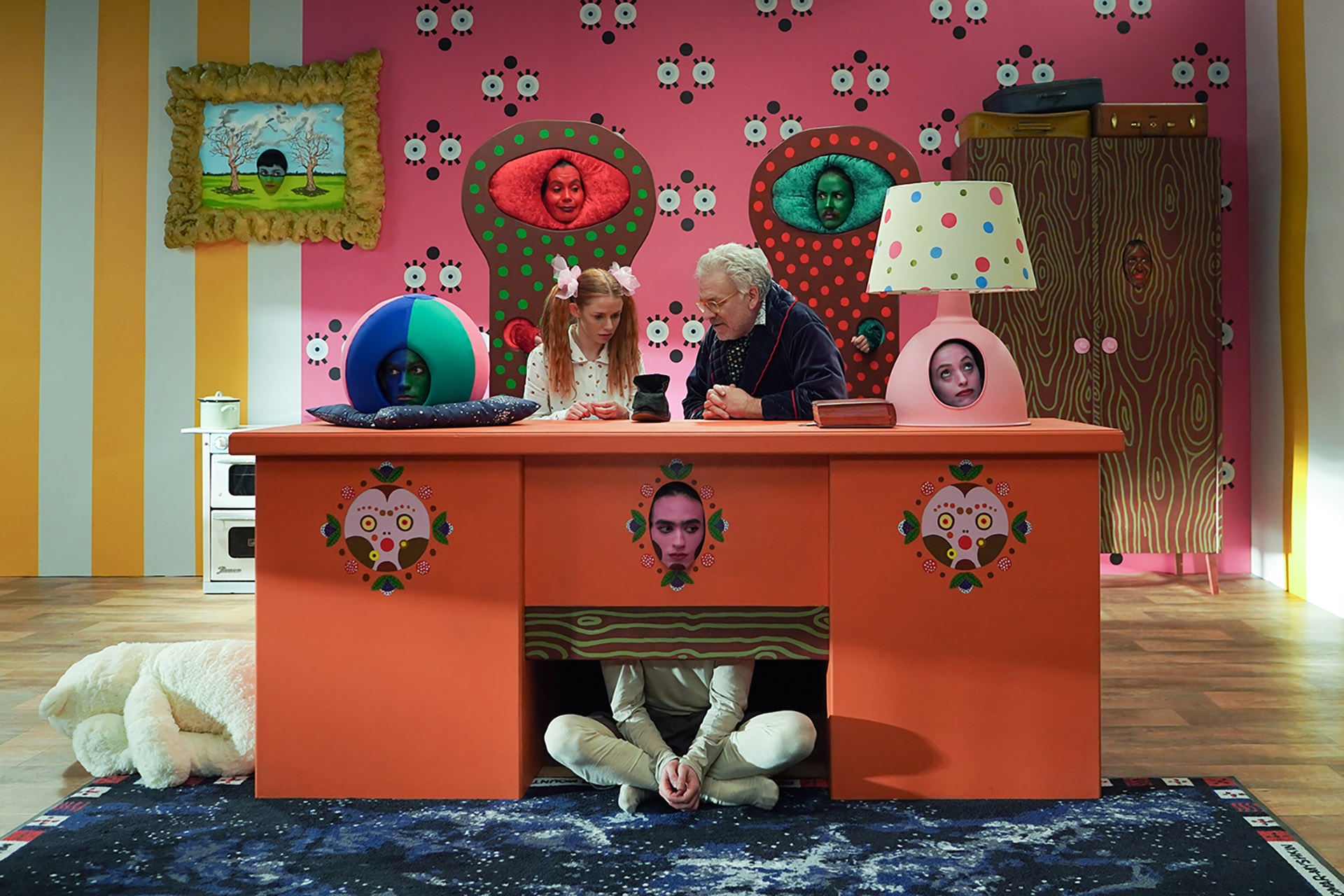
Roee Rosen, still from Kafka for Kids, 2022 (cinematographer: Avner Shahaf, Still: Goni Riskin)

- Kafka for Kids, 2022, 111 minutes, Rosen's feature is a cross-generic film, combining a musical comedy with layers of drama and of political documentary. The film is set as the pilot episode for a TV series that perversely aims to make Kafka's tales palpable for toddlers. The story delivered in this first episode is The Metamorphosis. It premiered as part of the Tiger Competition at the Rotterdam International Film Festival. While the tale of Gregor Samsa's transformation into a vermin is rendered in animation, the reading of the story occurs in live action, in the magical story-house, where an unnamed grandparent figure reads the story to a child, surrounded by a troupe of lively objects, such as Ms. Lamp and Mr. Table. These animistic friends dub the tale's characters, and perform the film's songs, accompanied by a toy orchestra. As the plot thickens, the ensemble is joined by other mascots, such as The Bearer of Bad News, and the house's sage: Kafka's left shoe. The centrality of the law in Kafka's writings and thought, and the notions of childhood that are explored in the film lead towards its end to a very different narrative realm: an exposition of the complex and troubling ways in which childhood is legally circumscribed in the occupied territories by military law.

== Publications ==
- Justine Frank: Sweet Sweat. Lukas & Sternberg. 2009. ISBN 978-1933128665.
- Maxim Komar-Myshkin – Vladimir's Night. Sternberg Press. 2014. ISBN 978-3956790591.
- The Blind Merchant (1989–1991). Sternberg Press. 2016. ISBN 978-3-95679-186-4.
- Live and Die as Eva Braun and Other Intimate Stories. Sternberg Press. 2017. ISBN 978-3-95679-240-3
- Desire and Dust. Kunsthal Charlottenborg and Sternberg Press, 2020. ISBN 978-3-95679-545-9 A selection of short texts, including texts by Paul B. Preciado and Sergei Tretiakov.
- Kafka for Kids. Kunstmuseum Luzern and Sternberg Press, 2022. ISBN 978-3-95679-662-3. An English-German edition of the film's script, with essays by Jean-Pierre Rehm, Fanni Fetzer and Sergio Edelzstein
