= Documenta X =

1997 art exhibition in Kassel, Germany

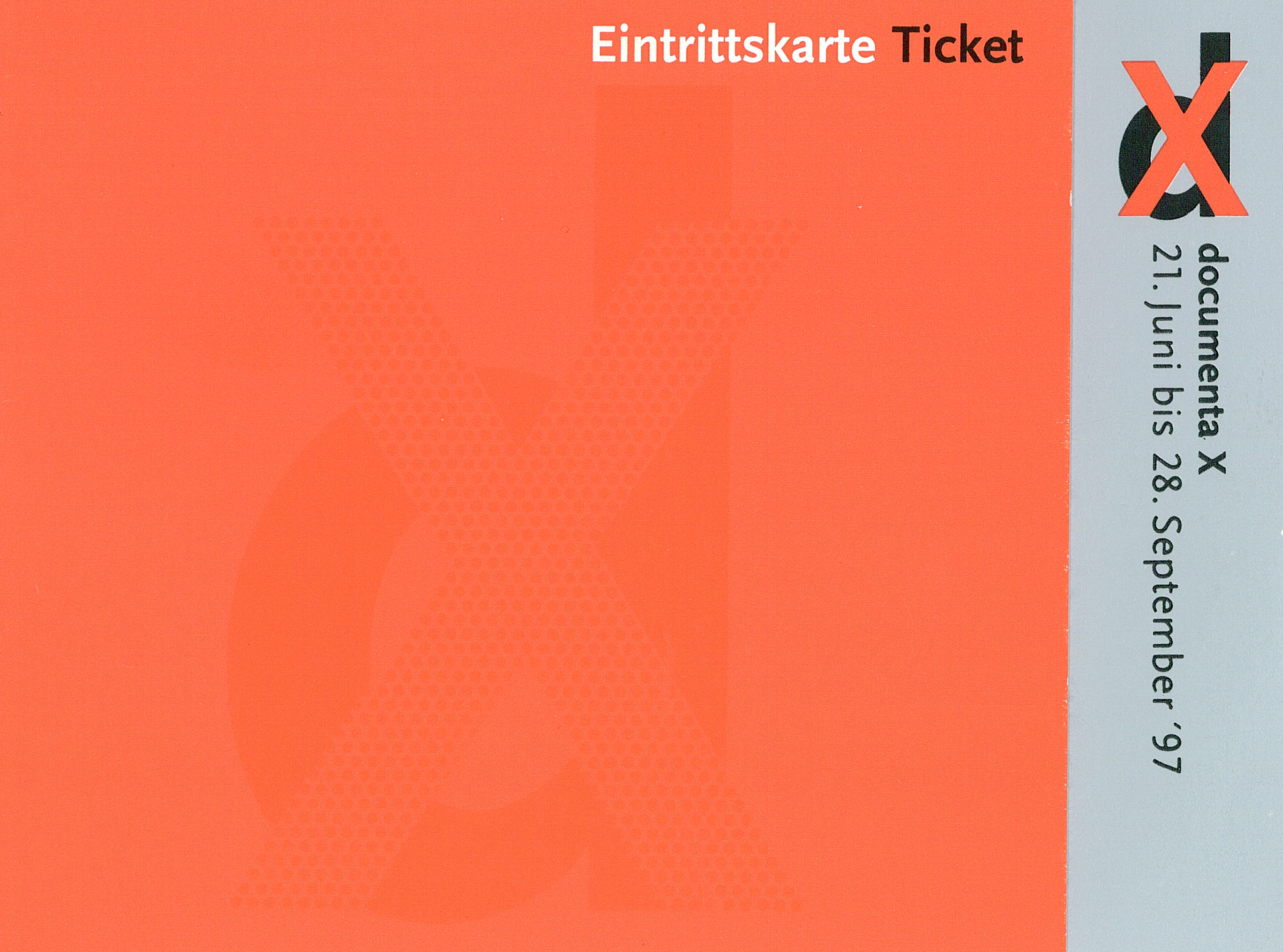
Foto Ticket documenta X

documenta X was the tenth edition of documenta, a quinquennial contemporary art exhibition. It was held between 21 June and 28 September 1997 in Kassel, Germany. The artistic director was Catherine David. This was the first time a woman was appointed as artistic director of documenta. It is also the first time that the website of the exhibition was conceived as an artistic part of it. Catherine David chose the Swiss curator Simon Lamunière to conceive, design and curate the project. Part of documenta X was the experimental performance space and digital platform "Hybrid WorkSpace", curated by Klaus Biesenbach, Nancy Spector, and Hans-Ulrich Obrist. The space was designed by architect Eicke Becker and featured important performances, among them the famous Christoph Schlingensief performance titled "Mein Filz, mein Fett, mein Hase, 48 Stunden Überleben für Deutschland" during which several artists were arrested. Florian Schneider used "Hybrid WorkSpace" as an opportunity to initiate the No one is illegal network.

== Participants ==
- A Vito Acconci Studio, Robert Adams, Pawel Althamer, Archigram, Archizoom Associati, Art & Language, Aya & Gal Middle East
- B Oladélé Ajiboyé Bamgboyé, Lothar Baumgarten, Catherine Beaugrand, Samuel Beckett, Joachim Blank & Karl Heinz Jeron, Ecke Bonk, Florian Borkenhagen, Marcel Broodthaers, Heath Bunting, Charles Burnett, Jean-Marc Bustamante
- C Lygia Clark, James Coleman, Stephen Craig, Jordan Crandall, Cabelo
- D Diedrich Diederichsen, Stan Douglas
- E Ed van der Elsken, Bruna Esposito, Walker Evans, Aldo van Eyck
- F Öyvind Fahlström, Patrick Faigenbaum, Harun Farocki, Feng Mengbo, Peter Fischli & David Weiss, Peter Friedl, Holger Friese
- G Daniele del Giudice, Liam Gillick, Gob Squad, Heiner Goebbels, Dorothee Golz, Dan Graham, Toni Grand, Hervé Graumann, Johan Grimonprez, Ulrike Grossarth
- H Hans Haacke, Raymond Hains, Richard Hamilton, Siobhan Hapaska, Carl Michael von Hausswolff, Michal Heiman, Nigel Henderson, Jörg Herold, Christine Hill, Carsten Höller & Rosemarie Trockel, Christine Hohenbüchler und Irene Hohenbüchler, Edgar Honetschläger, Felix Stephan Huber, Hybrid WorkSpace
- J Jackson Pollock Bar, Jodi (Joan Heemskerk & Dirk Paesmans), Jon Jost, On Kawara
- K Mike Kelley & Tony Oursler, William Kentridge, Martin Kippenberger, Joachim Koester, Peter Kogler, Aglaia Konrad, Rem Koolhaas, Hans-Werner Kroesinger
- L Suzanne Lafont, Sigalit Landau, Maria Lassnig, Jan Lauwers, Jozef Legrand, Antonia Lerch, Helen Levitt, Geert Lovink
- M Chris Marker, Kerry James Marshall, Christoph Marthaler & Anna Viebrock, Gordon Matta-Clark, Steve McQueen, Yana Milev, Mariella Mosler, Jean-Luc Moulène, Reinhard Mucha, Christian Philipp Müller, Matthias Müller, Matt Mullican, Antoni Muntadas
- N Matthew Ngui, Carsten Nicolai, Olaf Nicolai, Udo Noll & Florian Wenz, Stanislas Nordey
- O Hélio Oiticica, Gabriel Orozco
- P Adam Page, Gérard Paris-Clavel, Marc Pataut, Raoul Peck, Marko Peljhan, Michelangelo Pistoletto, Lari Pittman, Philip Pocock, Emilio Prini, Stefan Pucher
- R RASSIM®, Radio Mentale (Eric Pajot & Jean-Yves Barbichon), David Reeb, Gerhard Richter, Liisa Roberts
- S Christoph Schlingensief, Anne-Marie Schneider, Jean-Louis Schoellkopf, Thomas Schütte, Michael Simon, Abderrahmane Sissako, Alison Smithson & Peter Smithson, Alexander Sokurov, Nancy Spero, Wolfgang Staehle, Erik Steinbrecher, Meg Stuart, Hans-Jürgen Syberberg
- T Slaven Tolj, Tunga, Uri Tzaig, Rosemarie Trockel
- V Danielle Vallet Kleiner
- W Martin Walde, Jeff Wall, Jianwei Wang, Marijke van Warmerdam, Lois & Franziska Weinberger, Franz West, Garry Winogrand, Eva Wohlgemuth / Andreas Baumann
- Y Penny Yassour
- Z Andrea Zittel, Heimo Zobernig
