= Berlin Documentary Forum =

Art exhibition in Berlin, Germany

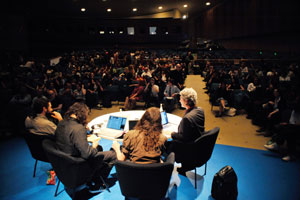
Auditorium "Documentary Moments: Memory of The Future", 4 June 2010

The Berlin Documentary Forum (BDF) was a biennale held at the Haus der Kulturen der Welt in Berlin. Interdisciplinary in orientation, it engaged with the 'documentary’ across the fields of film, photography, contemporary art, performance, architecture and cultural theory.

In its inaugural edition in 2010, the festival featured five days of thematic programming, including exhibitions, screenings, performances, readings and discussions developed and realised by a group of international artists and theoreticians. The festival's second edition in 2012 took a similar approach. A third and last edition took place in spring 2014. In 2016 and 2018, the festival was not able to find both a venue and funding.

All three editions of the Berlin Documentary Forum have been conceived by Berlin-based curator Hila Peleg, who has given the festival its theoretically nuanced interpretation, pushing the boundaries of the documentary far beyond its genre definition. She writes, "As the distinctions between reality and fiction, artifact and document are challenged today more than ever, the festival engaged with the documentary not as a mere picturing of reality but as a strategic way to come to terms with reality by means of working with and through images and narratives. The festival thus seeks to explore new modes of reflection and media education in a world where images play a crucial role in the construction of histories, identities and truth.”

Held at the historically loaded location of Haus der Kulturen der Welt, the festival also places a particular emphasis on architecture and spatial design, with the aim of generating specific settings for different artistic formats and audiences. In addition to its on-site events, the festival offered an online program which captured selected shows and discussions as well as in-depth interviews and essays on the role of contemporary documentary.

== Editions ==
=== Berlin Documentary Forum 1 (2–6 June 2010) ===
Artistic Director: Hila Peleg

Participants: Ayreen Anastas, Emily Apter, Ariella Azoulay, Ecke Bonk, Stella Bruzzi, François Bucher, Eduardo Cadava, Tony Cokes, Catherine David, Okwui Enwezor, Omer Fast, Rene Gabri, Philip Gourevitch, Brian Holmes, Thomas Keenan, Bettina Knaup, Joachim Koester, Antjie Krog, Xavier Le Roy, Chris Marker, Angela Melitopoulos, Marie-José Mondzain, João Moreira Salles, Edgar Morin, Michael Mrakitsch, Rabih Mroué, Issam Nasser, Marcel Ophüls, Rick Prelinger, Uruphong Raksasad, Jacques Rancière, Alain Resnais, Adrian Rifkin, Ben Russell, Walid Sadek, Lee Anne Schmitt, Florian Schneider, Stefanie Schulte Strathaus, Eileen Simpson, Eyal Sivan, Eduardo Thomas, Ben White, Frederick Wiseman and Zinny/Maidagan

Architecture: Kooperative für Darstellungspolitik

=== Berlin Documentary Forum 2 (31 May – 3 June 2012) ===
Artistic Director: Hila Peleg in collaboration with Catherine David, Antje Ehmann, Harun Farocki, Sylvère Lotringer, Florian Schneider, Eduardo Thomas.

Participants include: Craig Akin, Basma Alsharif, Eric Baudelaire, Neil Beloufa, Elisabetta Benassi, LD Brown, Jacob Ciocci, Mary Helena Clark, Catherine David, Mati Diop, Antje Ehmann, Harun Farocki, Miriam Faßbender, Robert Gardner, David Goldblatt, Thomas Heise, Walter Heynowski/ Gerhard Scheumann, Danièle Huillet/Jean-Marie Straub, Takashi Ito, Kawase Naomi, Hassan Khan, Thierry Knauff, Joachim Koester, Robert Kramer, Hayou Kwon, Oliver Laric, Laida Lertxundi, Dani Leventhal, Sylvère Lotringer, Makino Takashi, Vincent Meessen, Christine Meisner, Angela Melitopoulos, Shana Moulton, Rabih Mroué, Murata Takeshi, Peter Nestler, Olaf Nicolai, Anders Nilsson, Günter Nitschke, Robert Ochshorn, Melik Ohanian, Charlemagne Palestine, Volker Pantenburg, Christopher Pinney, Astra Price, Steve Reinke, Michael Robinson, Eva Marie Rødbro, Ben Russell, Eszter Salamon, Kenneth Salters, Sylvia Schedelbauer, Florian Schneider, Ella Shohat, Efrat Shvily, Eyal Sivan, Michael Snow, Phil Solomon, Hito Steyerl, William Tatge, Eduardo Thomas, Jeff Wall, Klaus Wildenhahn and Christopher Williams.

Architecture: Kooperative für Darstellungspolitik and Kuehn Malvezzi.

=== Berlin Documentary Forum 3 (29 May – 1 June 2014) ===
Artistic Director: Hila Peleg

The third forum had been considered impressive due to its audience and showcased material.

The third edition was centred on narrative as an agent in the fabrication of social reality, and included a wide range of contributions from the domains of film, contemporary art, performance, architecture, cultural history, and theory. (Note: Some of its manifestations can still be experienced at the HKW or permanently on its website, e.g. Michael Baers' graphic novel An Oral History of Picasso in Palestine.)

The extensive publication Berlin Documentary Forum 3 magazine elucidates the seventeen projects making up this edition, and includes essays and conversations contributed by Stella Bruzzi, Sylvère Lotringer, Jimmie Durham, Eran Schaerf, Smadar Dreyfus, Jesse Lerner, Roee Rosen, and Christa Blümlinger. (Note: It can be read online)

Participants: Maria Thereza Alves, Jimmie Durham and Richard Hill, Shaina Anand & Ashok Sukumaran, Michael Baers, Catherine David, Smadar Dreyfus, Harun Farocki, Sylvère Lotringer with Jesse Lerner, Sergio González Rodríguez and Sofia Canales, Rabih Mroué, Roee Rosen, Werner Ružička, Eran Schaerf with Pauline Boudry, Elfriede Jelinek, Eva Meyer, Uriel Orlow and Tim Zulauf, Cornelia Lund, Stefanie Schlüter, Eduardo Thomas & Koyo Yamashita, and others.

Architecture: Kooperative für Darstellungspolitik
