= Warmerdam =

Warmerdam is a Dutch surname that may refer to

- Alex van Warmerdam (born 1952), Dutch screenwriter, film director, and actor
- Cornelius Warmerdam (1915–2001), American pole vaulter
- Django Warmerdam (born 1995), Dutch football midfielder
- Marijke van Warmerdam (born 1959), Dutch photographer, installation artist, and video artist
- Max Warmerdam (born 2000), Dutch chess player
