= Biabiany =

Biabiany is a French surname. Notable people with the surname include:

- Jonathan Biabiany (born 1988), French footballer
- Minia Biabiany (born 1988), French artist, filmmaker and education researcher
