= Oladélé Ajiboyé Bamgboyé =

British-Nigerian artist and scientist (born 1963)

Ola Bamgboyé
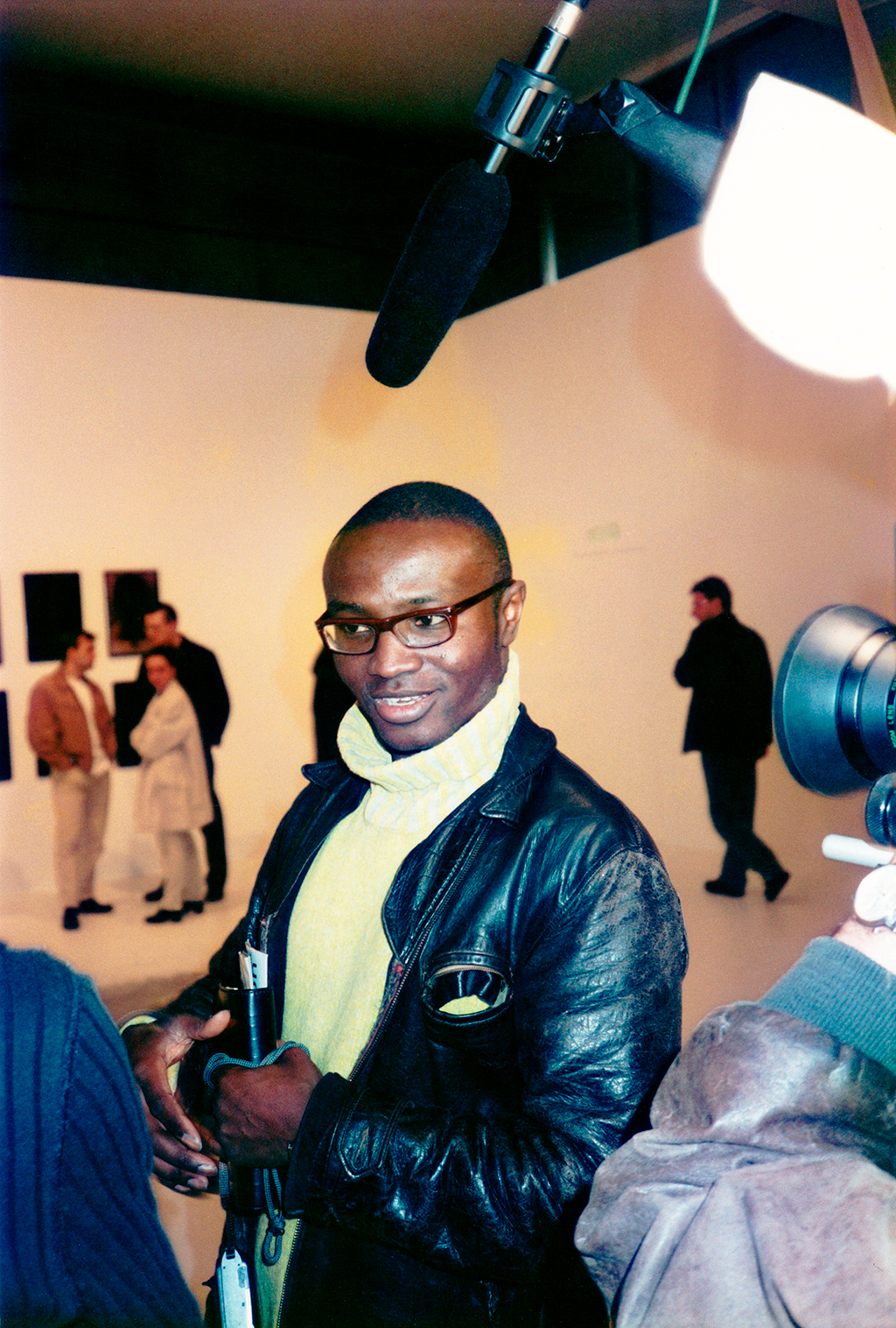
- Interviewed at documenta X, 1997
- Born: Oladélé Ajiboyé Bamgboyé; 1963 (age 62–63); Odo-Eku, Nigeria
- Citizenship: British
- Education: University of Strathclyde (BSc), Slade School of Fine Art (MA)
- Known for: photography, video art, interactive digital installations

Oladélé Ajiboyé Bamgboyé (born 1963) is a Nigerian-born British artist whose practice encompasses photography, video and interactive digital installations. His work explores questions of identity, representation, cultural heritage and the relationship between art and technology.

A founding member of the Street Level Gallery in Glasgow and curator at the Cambridge Darkroom Gallery, Bamgboyé has been exhibiting internationally since the 1990s. His work, Paradigm Shift: African Stories, was included in documenta X in Kassel in 1997. He subsequently developed the Unmasking Series, which explored the digital representation of cultural artefacts and questions of their ownership and accessibility.

== Early life and education ==
Bamgboyé was born in Odo-Eku, Nigeria, in 1963 as the second of seven children to Salome and Ezra Bamgboyé. In 1975, the family emigrated to Glasgow, Scotland. After six years in Scotland, the family moved back to Nigeria in 1981, while Bamgboyé remained in Scotland to continue his studies.

In 1985, he received a Bachelor of Science degree in Chemical & Process Engineering (BSc) from the University of Strathclyde. He later attended the Slade School of Fine Art, graduating with a Master of Arts in Digital Media & Philosophy of Art in 1998.

Bamgboyé was awarded three residencies: International Artist in Residence Awards at the Banff Centre and ArtPace in 1992 and 1999, respectively, and the Koninkrijk der Nederlanden Artist in Residence Scholarship from the V2_Lab and Witte de Wit in 2000.

== The Unmasking series ==
The Queen Mother Head, Unmasking 3, 2001.

The Unmasking series was initially developed through three parts between 1998 and 2001, examining questions of cultural ownership, museum collections, and the use of emerging digital technologies. A fourth work, Unmasking 4, was exhibited in 2026, continuing the series' exploration of digital technology and cultural heritage.

First conceptualised during Bamgboyé's studies at the Slade School of Fine Art in 1998, the series continued with Unmasking Part 2 at ArtPace in San Antonio, Texas, in 1999. A presentation of The Unmasking, Part II followed at Thomas Erben Gallery in New York in 2000, and Unmasking 3 was presented at Witte de With in Rotterdam in 2001.

For Unmasking Part 2 (1999), Bamgboyé developed an interactive installation incorporating a 3D scanner, modelling equipment and computer workstations. Visitors were invited to bring their own objects into the gallery to be digitised in real time, challenging conventional distinctions between museum artefacts and personal possessions.

The project also explored the digital representation of a bronze bust known as the Queen Mother Head, from Benin, Nigeria. For Unmasking 3 (2001), Bamgboyé collaborated with computer scientists to develop an interactive online framework using a three-dimensional model of the head scanned and supplied by the Liverpool Museum. Using VRML and Java technologies, the project allowed users to manipulate the model's appearance, including its lighting, colour, scale and individual features, exploring new approaches to cultural access and representation.

In July 2001, Bamgboyé delivered a lecture on Unmasking at Bridge the Gap?, an interdisciplinary conference organised by the Center for Contemporary Art Kitakyushu in Japan. The programme also included quantum physicist Anton Zeilinger, who lectured on quantum teleportation. A 2026 speaker biography published by the Research Center for Material Culture subsequently described exchanges between Bamgboyé and Zeilinger, connecting the Unmasking project to questions about the simultaneous physical and digital presence of museum objects.

In 2026, Unmasking 4 was exhibited at Stroom Den Haag as part of Universal Language: Concrete Composure, curated by Rachael Rakes. The work examines the relationship between digital technology and cultural objects, addressing questions of meaning, history and ownership.

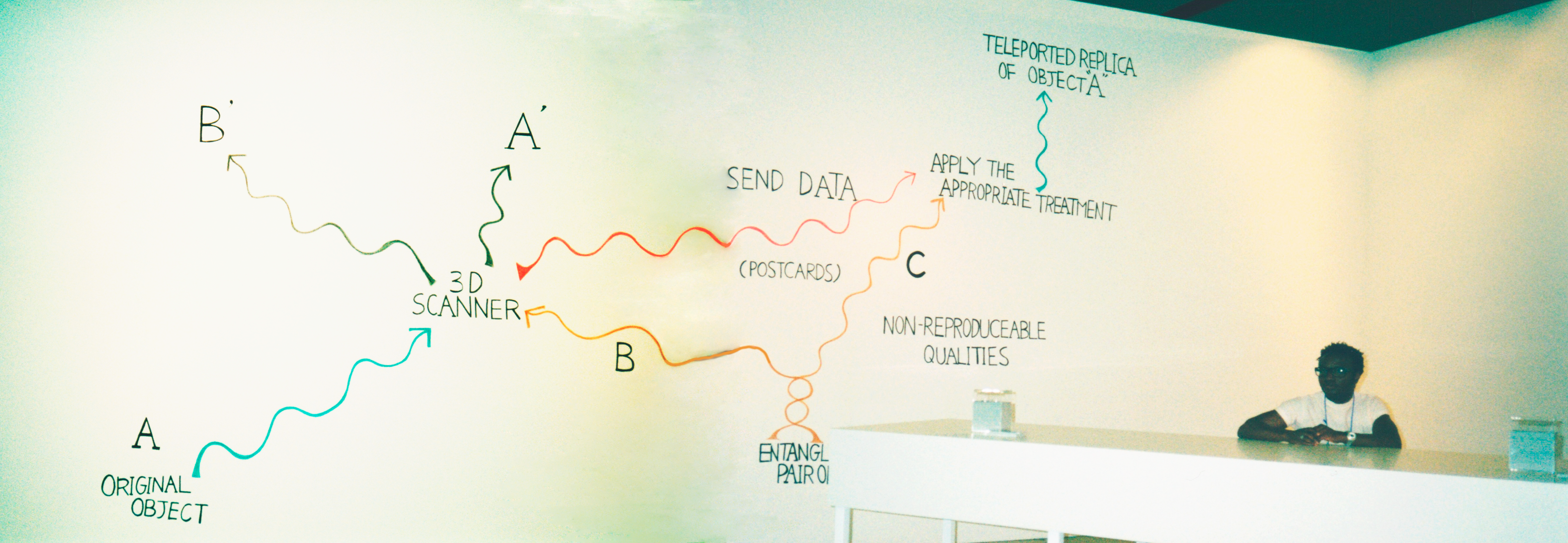
Installation view of the UNMASKING 3- Release Point #1, Yokohama, Japan.

== Exhibitions ==
Solo exhibitions
Year	Exhibition	Gallery	Location	Ref.
1985	Photographs	Glasgow School of Art	Glasgow, Scotland	
1989	ANIMA MUNDI: Still Life in Britain	The Stills Gallery	Edinburgh, Scotland	
1989	ANIMA MUNDI: Still Life in Britain	Maison de la Culture Parc Frontenac	Montreal, Canada	
1992	Five Big Images	Kiek In de Kok	Tallinn, Estonia	
1995	Well Without End	Künstlerhaus Bethanien Studio II	Berlin, Germany	
1998	The Unmasking, Part I	Slade College of Art UCL	London, UK	
1998	Movements	Städtische Galerie Bremen	Bremen, Germany	
1998	Oladele Ajiboye Bamgboyé	Gallery One, Culturgest	Lisbon, Portugal	
1999	Unmasking Part 2	ArtPace	San Antonio TX, USA	
2000	The Unmasking, Part II	Thomas Erben Gallery	New York NY, USA	
2000	Strangers and Paradise	Witte de With	Rotterdam, Netherlands	
2000	Videoworks	Helsinki Art Museum	Helsinki, Finland	
2001	Unmasking 3	Witte de With	Rotterdam, Netherlands	
2002	The Hair or the Man (1994) and Blink (2001)	Thomas Erben Gallery	New York NY, USA	
2023	Oladélé Ajiboyé Bamgboyé	Thomas Erben Gallery	New York NY, USA	

Group exhibitions
Year	Exhibition	Gallery	Location	Ref.
1986	Nine Photographers at the Glasgow Print Studios	Glasgow Print Studio	Glasgow, Scotland	
1987	New Light in Scottish Photography	The Stills Gallery	Edinburgh, Scotland	
1991	The Problematics of Identity in Photography	Dazibao	Montreal, Canada	
1994	Whitechapel Open	Whitechapel Gallery	London, UK	
1995	Self-Evident	Foto Institut	Rotterdam, The Netherlands	
1995	Self-Evident	Ikon Gallery	Birmingham, UK	
1995	Sorak International Art Biennale	Sorak International Art Biennale	Sorak, South Korea	
1996	Prospect 96	Schirn Kunsthalle	Frankfurt, Germany	
1996	In/Sight – African Photographers 1940 – Present	The Guggenheim	New York NY, USA	
1997	Die Anderen Modernen: Zeitgenossische Kunst aus Afrika, Asien und Lateinamerika	Haus der Kulturen der Welt	Berlin, Germany	
1997	Alternating Currents – as part of "Trades Routes: History and Geography – Africus	The 2nd Johannesburg Biennale	Johannesburg, South Africa	
1997	documenta X	Fridericianum	Kassel, Germany	
1998	Accrochage – Part II	Thomas Erben Gallery	New York NY, USA	
1998	Transatlantico	Centro Atlantico de Arte Moderno	Las Palmas de Gran Canaria, Spain	
1998	Afromedi@rt	Kunsthalle Krems	Krems an der Donau, Austria	
1998	Interference	African Art Museum of Ifan Cheikh Anta Diop	Dakar, Senegal	
1998	DAK'ART 98 – Biennial of Contemporary African Art	African Art Museum of Ifan Cheikh Anta Diop	Dakar, Senegal	
1999	Summer Gallery Show	Thomas Erben Gallery	New York NY, USA	
1999	Laboratorium	Museum voor Fotografie	Antwerp, Belgium	
2000	Intelligence – 1st Tate Triennial of Contemporary British Art	Tate Britain	London, UK	
2000	Mirror – as part of "Voila – le Monde dans la Tete"	Musée d'Art Moderne de Paris	Paris, France	
2000	Mission Finland	Helsinki Art Museum	Helsinki, Finland	
2000	Bodies of Resistance	Real Art Ways	Hartford CT, USA	
2000	Mostra Africana de Arte Contemporânea	SESC Pompeia	São Paulo, Brazil	
2000	South Meets West	Kunsthalle Bern	Bern, Switzerland	
2001	The Short Century	Museum of Contemporary Art	Chicago IL, USA	
2001	The Short Century	House of World Cultures Martin-Gropius-Bau	Berlin, Germany	
2001	The Short Century	Museum Villa Stuck	Munich, Germany	
2001	Animations	MoMA PS1	Long Island City NY, USA	
2001	Tirana Biennale 1 – Escape	National Museum of Fine Arts	Tirana, Albania	
2001	Mega Wave: Towards a New Synthesis	Yokohama International Triennale of Contemporary Art	Yokohama, Japan	
2002	The Short Century	MoMA PS1	Long Island City NY, USA	
2002-2003	Taipei Biennial	Taipei Biennial	Taipei, Taiwan, Republic of China	
2016	Après Eden: The Walther Collection	La Maison Rouge	Paris, France	
2021	25 years	Thomas Erben Gallery	New York NY, USA	
2022	Shifting Dialogues Photography from The Walther Collection	K21	Düsseldorf, Germany	
2023	Accrochage	Thomas Erben Gallery	New York NY, USA	
2024	Busan Biennale: Seeing in the Dark	Busan Modern & Contemporary History Museum	Busan, South Korea	
2026-2027	Universal Language: Concrete Composure	Stroom Den Haag	The Hague, Netherlands	

== Publications ==
- Bamgboyé, Oladélé Ajiboyé (1 April 2000). Writings on Technology and Culture. Kunstinstituut Melly.
- Bamgboye, Oladele; England, David; Tai, Ming (2001). Unmasking 3-A Framework for the Interactive African Art Museum (Technical report).
- Bamgboyé, Oladélé Ajiboyé (15 December 2000). Before & Beyond. Center for Contemporary Art, CCA Kitakyushu Kitakyushu, Japan.

Collections and catalogues
Year	Title	Description	ISBN
1989	Anima Mundi: Still Life in Britain	Canadian Museum of Contemporary Photography / National Gallery of Canada	978-0-88884-555-9
1993	Photofeis	Scottish International Festival of Photography catalogue	
1995	Prospect 96 at Frankfurter Kunstverein	Exhibition catalogue	978-3-908162-18-6, 978-3-908162-20-9
1995	Self Evident catalogue	Ikon Gallery catalogue	
1995	Freedom	An Amnesty International Glasgow Groups exhibition catalogue	978-1-873328-13-2
1996	In/Sight African Photographers, 1940 to the Present	Solomon Guggenheim Museum exhibition catalogue	978-0-8109-6895-0, 978-0-89207-169-2
1997	Die Anderen Modernen	Haus de Kulturen de Welt, Berlin exhibition catalogue	978-3-89466-194-6
1997	Trade Routes: History + Geography	Exhibition catalogue for 2nd Johannesburg Biennale	978-0-620-21522-0
1997	Documenta X	Short Guide, documenta und Museum Fredricianum	978-3-89322-938-3
1997	Crossing	Contemporary Art Museum, University of South Florida exhibition catalogue	978-1-889195-24-7
1999	Contemporary Photographers, 3rd edition	-	978-1-55862-190-9
1999	Dreams	A Fondazione Sandretto Re Rebaudengo per l'Arte event catalogue for the Venice Biennal of Visual Arts	978-88-8210-155-8
2000	Mostra Africana de Arte Contemporânea	Exhibition catalogue published by Associação Cultural Videobrasil	
2000	More Works about Buildings and Food	Catalogue of internet livestream, Fundição de Oeiras, Hangar K7	978-972-98700-0-2
2001	ARCO 02	Ifema Feria de Madrid catalogues	978-84-8215-202-8, 978-84-8215-203-5, 978-84-8215-201-1
2002	Taipei Biennial – Great Theatre of the World	Exhibition catalogue	978-957-01-2630-3
2003	Revisitar Canarias / The Canary Islands Revisited	Collection by Government of Canary Islands	978-84-7947-329-7, 978-84-7947-325-9

== Honours, awards and nominations ==
- Awarded the Richard Hough Prize for Photography (1992), Scotland.
- Awarded the Gulbenkian Foundation Grant (1993)
- Nominated for The Vincent van Gogh Biennial Award for Contemporary Art in Europe (2000)

== Critical reception ==
Bamgboyé's photographic and video works have been discussed in publications concerned with contemporary African art, identity and representation. In a 1996 essay for Flash Art International, Okwui Enwezor and Octavio Zaya examined his photography in the context of contemporary African artistic practice. They discussed his use of self-portraiture, performance and cultural symbolism, interpreting his photographs as questioning established representations of the Black male body and exploring the relationship between identity, memory and cultural displacement.

Reviewing The Unmasking, Part II and Earlier Photoworks at Thomas Erben Gallery in 2000, Karen E. Jones of Time Out New York contrasted the interactive digital installation with Bamgboyé's earlier large format black-and-white photographs. Jones was critical of the technological installation's ambitions, expressing a stronger preference for the photographs and their traditional portraiture.

In 2000, Adrian Searle discussed Bamgboyé's participation in the inaugural Vincent Award exhibition at the Bonnefantenmuseum in Maastricht, noting his video work while questioning the maturity of his artistic style at that stage. Later that year, reviewing Intelligence at Tate Britain for The Guardian, Searle discussed Spells for Beginners, a video addressing the breakdown of a personal relationship. Searle observed that the work's emotional content was moderated by its controlled editing and formal distance.

Bamgboyé's earlier photographic practice received renewed critical attention with his 2023 exhibition at Thomas Erben Gallery in New York. Writing for Collector Daily, Loring Knoblauch examined Defining Self Sufficiency (1993), Celebrate (1994) and the video The Hair or the Man (1994). Knoblauch considered how these works addressed diasporic identity through self-portraiture, multiple exposures and the staging of the artist's body, contrasting the introspective qualities of the earlier photographs with the more expressive character of Celebrate.
