= Eyal Sivan =

Israeli documentary filmmaker (born 1964)

- אייל סיון
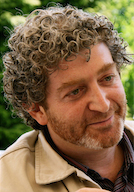
- Sivan in 2014
- Born: 9 September 1964 (age 61); Haifa, Israel
- Occupation: Filmmaker
- Spouse: Armelle Laborie
- Website: eyalsivan.info

Eyal Sivan (Hebrew: אייל סיון) is an Israeli documentary filmmaker, theoretician and scholar based in Paris, France.

== Career ==
After working as a professional commercial photographer in Tel Aviv, he left Israel in 1985 and settled in Paris. He now splits his time between Europe and Israel. Sivan has produced and directed more than a dozen political documentaries. Common State (2012), Jaffa (2009) and Route 181 (2003) won awards at various festivals.

Sivan's films are regularly exhibited in art exhibitions including Documenta, Manifesta and ICP New York. His work touches on such themes as the representation of political crime; the political use of memory; the ethics of documentary filmmaking; and the Israeli-Palestinian conflict. He is the founder and artistic director of the Paris-based documentary film company Momento ! and of the film distribution agency Scalpel. He created South Cinema Notebooks, a journal of cinema criticism published by the Sapir Academic College in Ashkelon. In response to a question by Aljazeera as to why so many "progressive and anti-Zionist academics, activists, and artists" are fleeing Israel, Sivan responded: "The veil of democracy is being ripped from Israeli faces."

== Pledge ==
In September 2025, Sivan signed an open pledge with Film Workers for Palestine pledging not to work with Israeli film institutions "that are implicated in genocide and apartheid against the Palestinian people."

== Academic postings ==
- Professor, Amsterdam University of the Arts, Nederlands
- Associate Professor, Media Production, University of East London, School of Arts and Digital Industries, United Kingdom
- Honorary Fellow, European Centre for Palestinian Studies, University of Exeter, United Kingdom
- Visiting professor, Netherlands Film Academy, Amsterdam, The Netherlands
- Visiting professor, Nuova Accademia di Belle Arti, Milan, Italy
- Visiting professor, Sapir Academic College, School of Sound and Visual Arts, Ashkelon, Israel

== Filmography ==
- 2012 Common State, Potential Conversation
- 2009 Jaffa, the Orange's Clockwork
- 2007 Citizens K, the Twin Brothers
- 2005 Faces of the Fallen
- 2004 I Love You All / Aus Liebe Zum Volk (co-directed with Audrey Maurion)
- 2003 Route 181, Fragments of a Journey in Palestine-Israel (co-directed with Michel Khleifi)
- 2001 On the Top of the Descent
- 1999 The Specialist, Portrait of a Modern Criminal
- 1997 Burundi, under Terror
- 1996 Itsembatsemba, Rwanda One Genocide Later
- 1995 Aqabat-Jaber, Peace with no Return?
- 1994 Jerusalem(s), Borderline Syndrome
- 1993 Itgaber, He Will Overcome – Conversations with Yeshayahou Lebowitz
- 1991 Israland
- 1990 Izkor, Slaves of Memory
- 1987 Aqabat-Jaber, Passing Through

== Other visual works ==
- 2012 Towards a common archive, testimonies of Zionist veterans of 1948. Multi screens video show.
- 2012 Montage Interdit. Berlin Documentary Forum 2 New practices across disciplines. Haus der Kulturen der Welt [www.hkw.de]
- 2010 Documentary moments 1 : Renaissance. Berlin Documentary Forum 1 New practices across disciplines. Haus der Kulturen der Welt
- 2009 Fragmented memory of spectatorship. Top 10 documentary programme IDFA Amsterdam
- 2008 Happy birthdays, towards a common archive – fragment 1. Multi screens video Installation
- 2001 Scalpel / Skalpel. (concept & artistic director) TV magazine for ARTE
- 1994 Jerusalem, Jerusalems. Conception and direction of a Theme evening for ARTE
- 1988 Progressive list for Peace. TV spots
