= Jean-Louis Schoellkopf =

French photographer (born 1946)

Jean-Louis Schoellkopf (born 1946) is a French photographer who has dedicated his work to investigating the effects of economic and social change on urban environments, primarily focusing on the consequences of deindustrialization across Europe.

== Biography and Early Career ==
Jean-Louis Schoellkopf was born in Colmar, France, in 1946. He began taking photographs in the late 1960s while residing in Canada, where he worked as a laboratory technician. His first projects included portraits of workers in factories, views of Montreal, and portraits of musicians.

On his return to France in 1974, he settled in Saint-Étienne, a heavily industrialized city that became central to his subsequent work, serving as a "model case" for observing social transformation. Schoellkopf was influenced by American photographers like Richard Avedon, Robert Frank, Walker Evans, and Diane Arbus, but he rejected the formalist approach of grand reportage in favor of a documentary style rooted in social criticism.

== Work ==
Schoellkopf's photography functions as a tool for investigation and social criticism to question contemporary urban developments. His documentary approach primarily reveals the impacts of the end of the industrial era on urban landscapes and working-class culture.

His work is characterized by:

- Thematic Focus: Exploring how economic change leads to new arrangements of urban spaces, new ways of thinking and living, and resulting conflicts.
- Scope: Shedding light on these issues in France and across Europe through historical, geographical, and sociological perspectives
- Methodology: He abandoned journalistic reporting in favor of a notion of portraiture conceived on the scale of the city . He uses a typological method to create sequences that show how human and family relationships configure cultural and aesthetic models within a social context.
- Working Protocol: He often works with a digital medium-format view camera on a tripod, inviting subjects to pose. His portraits of workers are often frontal, centered, and are intended to express their individuality and their relationship to their work.

== Exhibitions and Legacy ==
Schoellkopf has had solo exhibitions at institutions including the Musée d'Art Moderne in Saint-Étienne (1991), the Kubus in Hannover (1992), and the Musée de Louviers.

His notable group exhibitions include:

- A dialogue between American and European photography at MOCA, Los Angeles (1991).
- Documenta X in Kassel (1997).
- Universal Archive at the MACBA in Barcelona (2008).

Schoellkopf's work is held in major French public collections, including the Centre National des Arts Plastiques (CNAP), the Musée d'Art Moderne de la Ville de Paris, and the Musée d'Art Moderne et Contemporain (MAMC) in Strasbourg. The Musée d'Art Moderne in Saint-Étienne holds the largest collection of his work.

In a significant donation, Schoellkopf entrusted the Institut pour la photographie with his entire archive of negatives, ektachromes, and contact sheets, totaling more than 11,000 phototypes (approximately 30,000 images).
