= Manifesta 13 =

2020 European art biennial in Marseille

- Genre: Art exhibition
- Begins: August 28, 2020
- Ends: November 29, 2020
- Location: Marseille
- Country: France
- Previous event: Manifesta 12 (2018)
- Next event: Manifesta 14 (2022)

Manifesta 13 was an art exhibition within the Manifesta European art biennial, hosted in Marseille, France, between August and November 2020.

== Overview ==
Manifesta is a European art biennial that rotates between host cities. It will be the first French Manifesta, hosted in Marseille. Originally scheduled to run June 7 to November 1, 2020, the exhibition was postponed due to the COVID-19 pandemic, and rescheduled for later in the year, August 28 to November 29, 2020, with a phased rollout of programming.

== Planning ==
Manifesta 13's artistic team includes Alya Sebti, Katerina Chuchalina, and Stefan Kalmár.

Manifesta chose Marseille for 2020 based on its status as an "outsider city" in which residents put their association with the multicultural city before their affiliation with the country. Architects Winy Maas and MVRDV provided cultural research on the city to best integrate Manifesta into it. According to Manifesta director Hedwig Fijen, their firms were in part chosen for their background in urban planning and potential to create an "Eiffel Tower legacy" for the city from the exhibition. The festival would also maintain an office in the city open to locals. At a contentious press event, French journalists questioned the city's outlay towards the festival and the extent to which the event would include local curators.

Marseille allocated €627,000 (US$715,000) for Manifesta 13 hosting rights and committed €2.4 million (US$2.7 million) to developing the 2020 event. The city saw the festival as expanding on the legacy of its 2013 European Capital of Culture year of cultural events and funding to build the Museum of European and Mediterranean Civilisations. While the city has grown as an arts hub, by 2018 some of Marseille came to distrust outside cultural interventions, such as Manifesta, based on lingering issues of poverty and a small commercial art sector following the 2013 events.
