= Minia Biabiany =

French visual artist (born 1988)

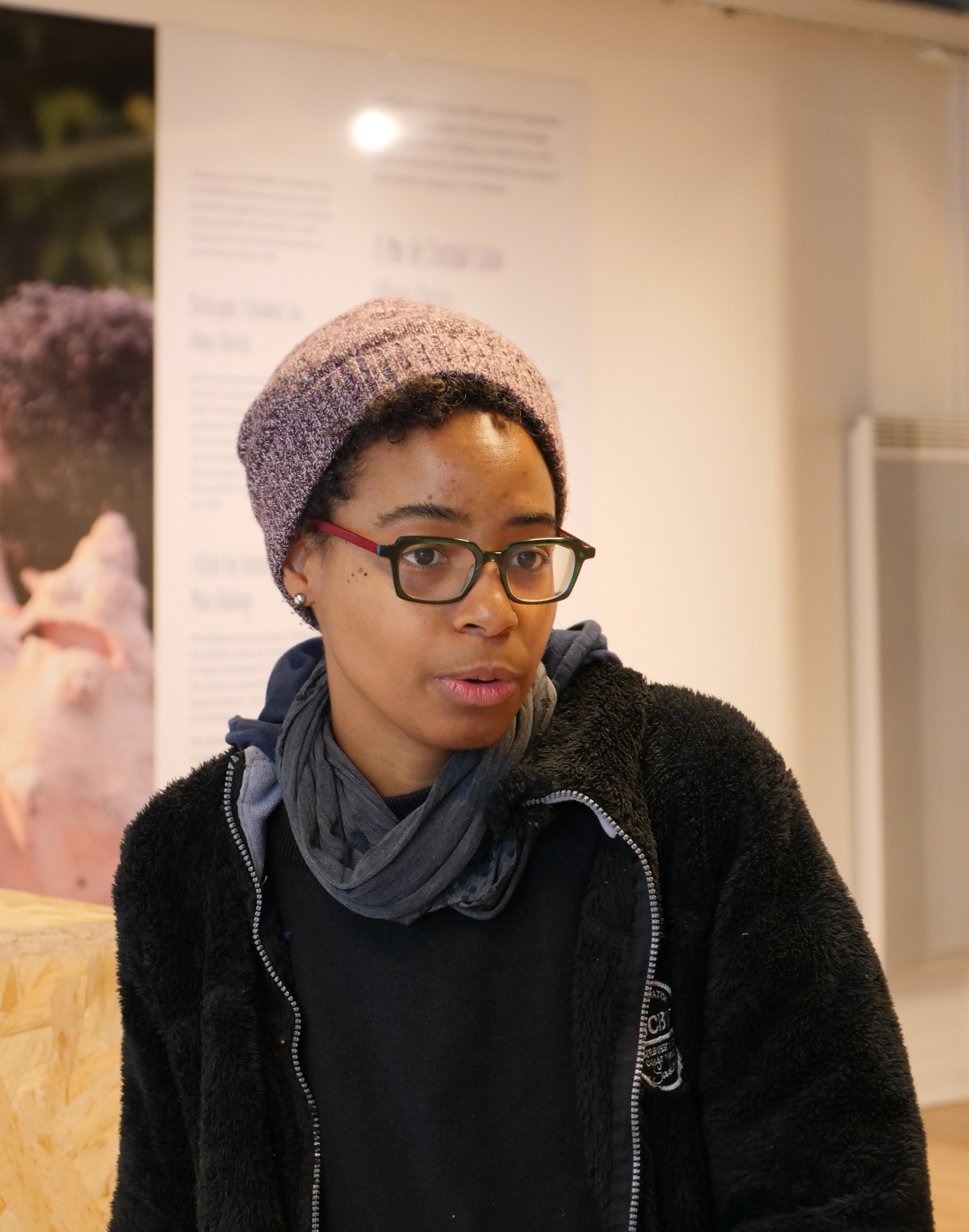
- Born: 1988 (age 37–38); Basse-Terre, Guadeloupe
- Education: École nationale supérieure des beaux-arts de Lyon
- Website: https://www.miniabiabiany.com

Minia Biabiany (born 1988) is an artist, filmmaker, and education researcher from Guadeloupe. Her work has emphasized the roles stories and physical spaces play in Guadeloupean culture, while also generally focusing on cultural aspects that are derived from colonial and postcolonial contexts.

== Early life ==
Minia Biabiany was born in the capital of the French overseas department of Guadeloupe, Basse-Terre, in 1988.

She studied in Metropolitan France, at the École nationale supérieure des beaux-arts de Lyon. In 2011, she obtained an art diploma, alongside the French university system's félicitations du jury distinction.

== Career ==
=== Artistic practice ===
The subjective experience of space, both psychological and physical, has been a topic Biabiany has explored in her work. In the context of her exhibition spaces, she has made conscious decisions regarding which materials and techniques were used, engaging in a holistic approach that incorporates both spirituality and culture.

Biabiany has combined different types of objects, including plants and the human body, in videos and installations. Weaving has also been featured in these videos and installations, as, in her artwork, weaving as well as braiding have been used to challenge preconceived standards of knowledge transmission and storytelling.

The effects of colonialism, both contemporary and historical, have been a very important theme throughout Biabiany's work, which has often engaged with what colonial systems have entailed for Guadeloupe. This has included highlighting past perspectives on the various colonial mechanisms the islands have been subjected to, viewing colonialism through the lens of assimilation to Metropolitan French culture, and examining how the Guadeloupean people have resisted on different scales and in different situations.

Biabiany has also occasionally touched on concepts relating to feminist ideas, such as, for instance, in the context of her exhibition Musa Nuit.

=== Educational work ===
Bibiany has conducted research in the field of education.

She has devised experimental educational projects. Two of these, Semillero Caribe (seminars organized by a group of the same name) and Doukou (a platform), have combined theory originating from the Caribbean, art, and the body.

== Exhibitions ==
This list contains both solo and group exhibitions.

- 2022: How to Sing Our Songs on Their Land, TKG+ Projects, Taipei (Taiwan)
- 2022: Diffé, Palais de Tokyo, Paris (France)
- 2022: Pluie sur mer, Le Grand Café, Saint-Nazaire (France)
- 2020: Global(e) Resistance, Centre Pompidou, Paris (France)
- 2020: Spoiled Waters Spilled, CCN Ballet National de Marseille, Manifesta 13 Marseille (France)
- 2020: Traits d'union.s, Manifesta 13 Marseille (France)
- 2020: One month before being known in that island, The Kulturstiftung Basel H. Geiger, Basel (Switzerland)
- 2020: One month after being known in that island, The Kulturstiftung Basel H. Geiger, Basel (Switzerland)
- 2020: J'ai tué le papillon dans mon oreille, Magasin des horizons, Grenoble (France)
- 2020: Musa nuit, Fondation Hermès, La Verrière, Brussels (Belgium)
- 2020: Paroles de Lieux, Les Tanneries, Amilly (France)
- 2019: Le jour des esprits est notre nuit, CRAC Alsace, Altkirch (France)
- 2018: Toli Toli, TKG+ Projects, Taipei (Taiwan)
- 2016: Spelling, Signal Center for Contemporary Art, Malmö (Sweden)
