= Freddy Salem =

British businessman (born 1941)

- Born: May 1941 (age 84)
- Education: INSEAD
- Occupation: Businessman
- Spouse: Muriel Salem

Freddy Salem (born May 1941) is a British businessman whose interests are in logistics and supply chain management. With his wife Muriel, the Salems have formed a large private art collection which is on display by appointment at their home in Regent's Park, London.

== Early life and education ==
Salem was born in May 1941 in Lebanon. He gained his BA in business administration from the American University of Beirut and his MBA from INSEAD in 1966. His father ran a money-changing business in Beirut, which Freddy and his three brothers joined in the 60s and 70s before they turned to financing Nigerian textile traders. After the breakout out the Lebanese Civil War in 1975, the family fled to London.

As of 2015, he has two surviving brothers, Isaac, who is older and Beno, who is younger. The fourth brother, Raymond, died in 2002, following a stroke 5 years earlier.

Today, Freddy provides for a scholarship to his alma mater, INSEAD, for students from West Africa.

== Career ==
Salem's business interests are in logistics and supply chain management. His directorships include Parker Logistics Limited, Forextra Developments Limited, and Forextra (Grosvenor) Limited. He is company secretary of Frelene Limited.

== Property ==
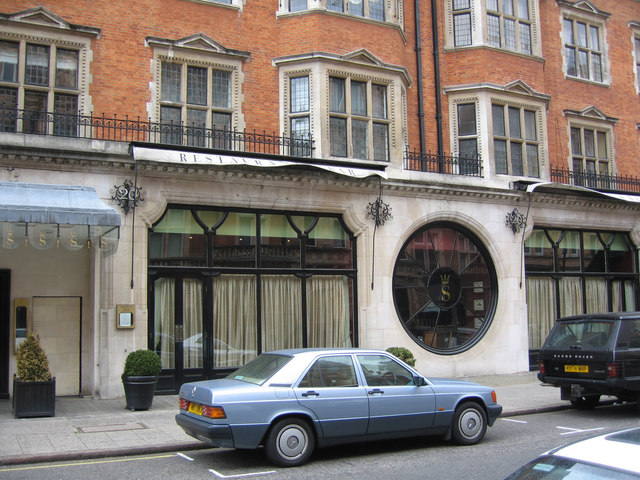
Scott's restaurant, Mount Street.

Freddy and his nephew Moussa Salem are the owners, via a company registered in the United Kingdom, of 14-25 Mount Street in London, a row of buildings that includes Scott's restaurant where James Bond author, Ian Fleming, used to dine, and shops such as Marc Jacobs and Ralph Lauren with flats above. As of March 2015, the buildings are for sale with a starting price of £110 million.

== Art collection ==
Salem and his Beirut-born wife Muriel (who moved to England in 1975) are art collectors and the owners and patrons of the Cranford Collection. Formed in 1999, the Salems' art collection by 2014 comprised over 700 works with many from the Young British Artists of the 1990s. It is considered Britain’s biggest private contemporary art collection. The collection is on display at a private home in the Regent's Park area with viewing by appointment. The Salems have been advised by Andrew Renton until 2011 when Anne Pontegnie succeeded him.
