= Toporovski collection controversy =

Controversy concerning the Russian avant-garde artworks from the Dieleghem Foundation

In 2017, more than 20 pieces of Russian avant-garde from the Dieleghem Foundation (Toporovski collection, owned by Igor Toporovski) formed a nucleus in the exhibition From Bosch to Tuymans, A Vivid Narrative (2017), a (re)installation of the collection at the Museum voor Schone Kunsten (MSK). In 2018, however, the works from the Toporovski collection were said to be of doubtful authenticity by a group of art dealers and some scholars in The Art Newspaper and De Standaard. This resulted in the indefinite suspension of the museum's director, Catherine de Zegher.

== Suspension of De Zegher, further controversy ==
Due to the problems surrounding the collection, the museum board ordered an audit of the event and suspended the then-director, Catherine de Zegher, pending this process.

Later, several Flemish museum directors critiqued the handling of de Zegher and the MSK. De Zegher held fast to her claim that they did all the necessary art historical research but could not produce evidence of this. Later it was also shown that de Zegher lied about two external experts having researched the collection. Both mentioned external experts denied having researched the collection A former exhibition in France featuring work from the Toporovski's was questioned as well, however in that case, the court had ruled the paintings to be real. The Flemish Parliament debated in February 2018 how to limit the adverse effects of this controversy for other Belgian museums. Following these events, several of the employees of the Museum of Fine Arts Ghent formally (anonymously) denounced de Zegher in a letter sent to city officials in late 2018.In the letter, the museum team officially withdrew their confidence in the former director, referring a.o. to her self-righteous attitude while in charge of the museum and her lack of people management skills. The team expressed their unwillingness to collaborate with de Zegher any further, in case she would be allowed to return to the museum. De Zegher disputes any wrongdoing. She and the City of Ghent closed the exhibition a month into the controversy. They terminated the contract with the owner so that the works could be returned. The latter stated that an investigation would be conducted to verify the authenticity of the works. Currently, the matter is in the hands of an investigating judge. Toporovski claimed that lab research already showed that several works are indeed from the proclaimed area and are thus real, however, no tangible evidence to this effect has so far been made public.

== Support for de Zegher ==
After seven months of her suspension, 63 artists, among museum directors and intellectuals, published a letter supporting Catherine de Zegher. Among those to have signed the letter include artists Eija-Liisa Ahtila, Luis Camnitzer, Cristina Iglesias, Simryn Gill, Mona Hatoum, Giuseppe Penone, Luc Tuymans, and Cecilia Vicuña; art historian Benjamin H. D. Buchloh; Catherine David, deputy director of the Centre Pompidou in Paris; Bartomeu Mari, director of the National Museum of Modern and Contemporary Art in Seoul; and Ann Gallagher, director of Tate Modern's British Art collections. The letter reads:

We are appalled to see how one of the preeminent women curators of her generation internationally, a wholly professional and widely acclaimed museum director, has been made the plaything of unscrupulous media and of international speculation in the art of the Russian avantgarde, resulting in a severe media process destroying her work and reputation. Through this letter, we affirm our full support for Catherine de Zegher as museum director and as curator. We challenge the local and national authorities concerned on the important issue of having, keeping, protecting and supporting visionary museum directors in their country, remaining independent in their judgement from the pressure media exert and the correlated hype and sensation, and above all from the growing influence of a certain art market linked with finance and power. We ask them to seriously pay attention to the role art and museums play in our cities, regions and in the society at large, the great principles they represent, and the necessity of having inspirational museum directors and curators to lead the way."

On October 17, 2018, de Zegher organized a press conference. She stated that several of the show's works had since been tested in laboratories and were proven to contain materials dating from the period to which they were attributed. She compared her position to that of artists persecuted in Russian pogroms and herself being an Amazon fighting for art. She also repeated her earlier claim that art-historical research had been undertaken. However, she did not present any evidence to this effect, claiming instead that this evidence would be published in a book in 2019. During the entire controversy, de Zegher worked closely with reputation manager Ine Mariën (also present at the final press conference). In October 2018, Toporovski announced that several works were tested for their authenticity and proven to be real. He referred to the publication of a book regarding the controversy.

On November 5, the International Committee for Museums and Collections of Modern Art (CiMAM) issued a statement in support of Catherine de Zegher. The full statement reads:

In its capacity as the international association for Museums and Collections of Modern and Contemporary art, and as an affiliate of ICOM, CIMAM wishes to register its deep concern at the treatment of Catherine de Zegher in her capacity as Director of the Museum of Fine Arts (MSK) in Ghent. Since January 2018, as part of investigations into the authenticity of a group of Russian modernist works, Ms de Zegher has been subject to a series of accusations that have not been dismissed nor brought to appropriate conclusion. This has caused considerable damage to her reputation as a museum professional and curator of the highest standing internationally. In expressing its support for Ms de Zegher CIMAM also wishes to defend the principles of integrity and respect for museum professionals globally at a time when museums and their directors are being confronted with pressures from the art market, undue interference from governing bodies, and campaigns based on misinformation

== Litigation and indefinite suspension ==
Late January 2019, the city of Ghent formally lodged a complaint against de Zegher and the Dieleghem Foundation after strong evidence came to light suggesting documents about the loan - supposedly dating to 2017 and confiscated by the public prosecutor in early 2018 - had been forged. In reply, de Zegher attempted to sue the alderman of culture for libel, but the plea appeared to be ungrounded.

On February 22, 2019, de Zegher was suspended indefinitely as director, based on the audit findings that had started in 2018. She will not return to the Museum of Fine Arts but remains an employee of the Department of Culture. he city also announced that de Zegher remains subject to ongoing disciplinary proceedings, pending a possible definite dismissal.

In December 2019, the Belgian newspaper De Standaard reported that Igor Toporovski and his wife Olga Toporovski were arrested and kept in provisional detention at Ghent's prison due to the potential fraud in regard with the Toporovski collection. However, they were released with specific conditions awaiting their trial. She retired in 2020.
