= Siobhán Hapaska =

Irish sculptor (born 1963)

- Born: 1963 (age 62–63); Belfast, Northern Ireland
- Education: Goldsmiths, University of London; Middlesex University
- Known for: Sculpture

Siobhán Hapaska (born 1963) is an Irish sculptor.

== Early life and education ==
Hapaska was born in Belfast and studied art at Middlesex Polytechnic from 1985 to 1988 before completing a master's degree at Goldsmiths College in 1992. In 1993 she won a Barclays Young Artist Award and had her first solo exhibition at the Institute of Contemporary Arts in London during 1995 and 1996.

== Work ==
Hapaska works with a variety of synthetic and natural materials, and often incorporates sound and light elements into her work. Her sculptures range in form from completely abstracted to hyperrealistic.
