= Stefan Kalmár =

Stefan Kalmár is a German curator who was the director of the Institute of Contemporary Arts (ICA) in London from 2016 until 2021.

Kalmár was executive director and chief curator of Artists Space, New York from 2009 to 2016, director of Kunstverein München from 2004 to 2009, director of the Institute of Visual Culture, Cambridge from 2000 to 2004 and artistic director of Cubitt Gallery, London from 1997 to 1999.

== Education ==
Kalmár studied Cultural Studies at University of Hildesheim, Germany before moving to London in 1995 to continue to study Cultural and Curatorial Studies at Goldsmiths College, London.

== Career ==
=== Artists Space, 2009–2016 ===
Notable exhibitions during Kalmár's tenure include presentations on and collaborations with artists and curators such as Chris Kraus and Julie Ault, Danh Vo, Bernadette Corporation, Cameron Rowland, Laura Poitras, Zilia Sánchez, Lukas Duwenhögger, Marc Camille Chaimowicz and The Estate of Charlotte Posenenske. In a review of the Charlotte Posenenske exhibition, The New York Times art critic, Roberta Smith, wrote, 'It occurred to me that if Alfred H. Barr Jr., founding director of the Museum of Modern Art, were dropped into Mr. Kalmár's shoes, he would have come up with something similar'.

In 2016 Kalmár said that Artists Space has been increasingly involved in addressing the interplay and blurred lines between contemporary art and political practice with a focus on gentrification and how contemporary arts organisations “institutionalise antagonisms.” Artists Space and Common Practice invited artists Nitasha Dhillon and Amin Husain of the collective MTL+ to facilitate programming that would unite activist groups across the city under five “strands”: Indigenous Struggle, Black Liberation, Free Palestine, Global Wage Workers, and De-Gentrification.

In 2012, Kalmár introduced a second location, Artists Space Books & Talks, which has become a platform for critical discussion in contemporary art and culture.

Artists Space's 2012 exhibition Radical Localism: Art, Video and Culture From Pueblo Nuevo's Mexicali Rose, was described by The New York Times as ‘a small but vigorous sampling of what is emerging’ from Mexicali Rose, an alternative art space and community centre established by the filmmaker Marco Vera in Pueblo Nuevo, a working-class neighbourhood in Mexicali, a city on the Mexican side of the border with the United States.

=== ICA, 2016–2021 ===
When Kalmár was appointed to succeed Gregor Muir as director of the ICA in 2016, he was the first foreigner director in the institution's then 75-year history.

Under Kalmár's directorship, the ICA signed the No Fossil Fuel Money Pledge and became an accredited Living Wage employer. The ICA cinema became fully independent and live performance, theatre and literature were reintroduced to the ICA programme.

In an interview published in Frieze in 2017, Kalmár outlined his future ambitions for the ICA to be an organization that revitalizes the belief and the civic responsibility of cultural institutions by trying to create an organizational structure that not only disclaims its own contradictions but actively tries to overcome them. He oversaw exhibitions by Cameron Rowland and Forensic Architecture as well as retrospectives of work by Kathy Acker and Julie Becker.

Named in ArtReview's 2019 Power 100, Kalmár commented, 'We are in a time of crisis' in reference to Brexit and the rise of populism, and stated that 'these are times for artists to lead' regarding the announcement of Wolfgang Tillmans' appointment as Chair of the ICA's Board.

== Other activities ==
Kalmár was a judge for the Turner Prize in 2014. In 2017, he served on the jury for the stand prizes of Frieze Art Fair.

Kalmár was also a member of the artistic team for the 13th edition of Manifesta in Marseille 2020, together with Alya Sebti and Katerina Chuchalina.

== Exhibitions ==
=== Selected exhibitions organised by Kalmár at Artists Space ===
- Lukas Duwenhögger: Undoolay (2016) with Raven Row
- Cameron Rowland: 91020000 (2016)
- Tom of Finland: The Pleasure of Play (2015) toured to Taidehalli, Helsinki
- Hito Steyerl (2015)
- Laura Poitras: 9/11 Trilogy (2014)
- Living with Pop: A Reproduction of Capitalism Realism with Kunsthalle Düsseldorf (2014)
- Sam Pulitzer: A Colony for “Them” (2014)
- Macho Man Tell It To My Heart: Collected by Julie Ault (2013)
- Aaron Flint Jamison (2013)
- Zilia Sánchez (2013)
- Bernadette Corporation: 2000 Wasted Years (2012) toured to ICA London
- Radical Localism: Art, Video & Culture from Pueblo's Mexicali Rose, Curated by Chris Kraus (2012)
- Dexter Sinister: Identity (2011 - 2012)
- Anarchism Without Adjectives On the Work of Christopher D’Arcangelo 1975-1979 (2012)
- Hilary Lloyd (2011)
- Mark Morrisroe: From Tis Moment On with Fotomuseum Winterthur (2011)
- Sean Snyder (2010)
- Danh Vo: Autoerotic Asphyxiation (2010)
- Charlotte Posenenske (2010)
- Duncan Campbell: Make It New John (2010)
- Marc Camille Chaimowicz: Enough Tiranny Recalled 1972 – 2009 (2009)

=== Selected exhibitions organised by Kalmár at Kunstverein München ===
- Liam Gillick: Three perspectives and a Short Scenario (2008) with Witte de With, Kunsthalle Zürich, Museum of Contemporary Art Chicago
- Allora & Calzadilla: Wake Up, Clamor, Sediments, Sentiments (Figures of Speech) In collaboration with Haus der Kunst (2008)
- Oh Girl, It's a Boy! (2007) together with Henrik Oleson
- Wolfgang Tillmans Beugung (2007)
- The Secret Public The Last Days of the British Underground 1979 - 1989 (2006), toured to ICA London
- An American Family, in collaboration with Alan Raymond (2006)
- General Idea 1967–1995, In collaboration with Barbara Fischer & Emily Carr Institute, Vancouver (2006)
- Jeremy Deller (2005)
- Icestorm (2005)

=== Selected exhibitions organised by Kalmár at Institute of Visual Culture ===
- Wittgenstein: Family likenesses (2004)
- Tom Burr: The Screens (2003)
- No Ghost Just a Shell, In Collaboration with Kunsthalle Zürich and SF MoMA (2002-2003)
- Cognition Control: from the Archive of Stephen Willats (2002)
- Angela Bulloch: Horizontal Technicolor (2002)
- Nils Norman: Geocruiser together with South London Gallery, Venice Biennial, Ikon Gallery, Peckham Library; Galerie für Landschaftkunst Hamburg (2001)

=== Selected exhibitions organised by Kalmár at Cubitt Gallery ===
- Jochen Klein retrospective (1999)
- Infected Culture (1998)
- Artists Groups II: KLAT (1998)
- Artists Groups I: Akademie Isotrope (1997)

=== Selected exhibitions organised by Kalmár on a freelance basis ===
- Art in the Social Welfare Office: Carsten Höller, Franz West, Peter Land, Social Welfare Office, Hanover (1996)
