= Manifesta =

Nomadic contemporary art biennial

Manifesta – European Biennial of Contemporary Art
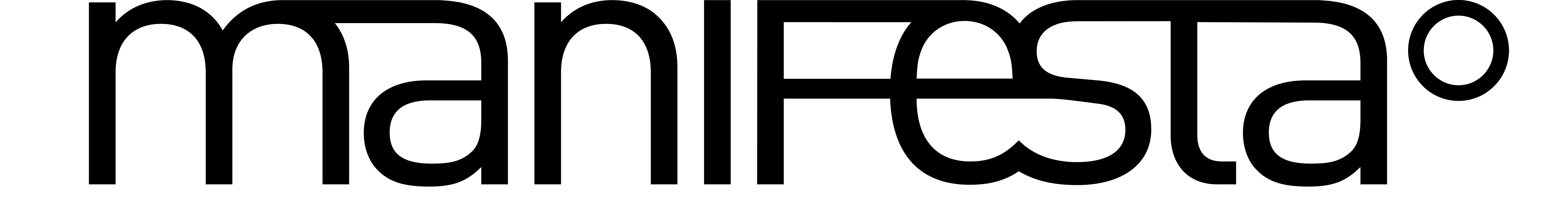
- Genre: biennale, focus on contemporary art
- Begins: 1994
- Frequency: biennial, every two year.
- Location: Itinerant
- Previous event: Manifesta 15 (2024)
- Next event: Manifesta 16 (2026)
- Organiser: International Foundation Manifesta
- Website: manifesta.org

Manifesta, also known as the European Nomadic Biennial, is a European pan-regional contemporary cultural biennale.

== History ==
Manifesta was founded in 1994 by Dutch art historian Hedwig Fijen.

Manifesta 1. The first edition took place in Rotterdam. One of the coordinators in Rotterdam was Thomas Meyer zu Schlochtern of the Rotterdamse Kunststichting. Among the local artists brought into the international scene, were Jeanne van Heeswijk, Bik Van Der Pol, and Joep van Lieshout.

Manifesta 2. Luxembourg (1998)

Manifesta 3. Ljubljana (2000)

Manifesta 4. Frankfurt (2002)

Manifesta 5. San Sebastián (2004)

Manifesta 6. The 2006 edition of Manifesta was set to happen in Nicosia, Cyprus, under the direction of Florian Waldvogel, Mai Abu ElDahab, and Anton Vidokle. In June 2006, Nicosia for Art, the city-run nonprofit organization sponsoring the exhibition, cancelled the event due to political turmoil around the green line of Nicosia.

Manifesta 7. the 2008 edition took place across four cities in the Trentino-Alto Adige/Südtirol region of northern Italy: Bolzano, Trento, Rovereto, and Fortezza. Curated by Adam Budak, Anselm Franke, Hila Peleg, and the Raqs Media Collective, the exhibition was titled "100 Miles in 100 Days" and explored themes of transformation, memory, and regional identity. Among the participating artists were Claire Fontaine, Tatiana Trouvé, and Runa Islam, whose works reflected the biennial’s focus on site-specificity and cultural dialogue within post-industrial and historical spaces.

Manifesta 8. Murcia in dialogue with northern Africa (2010)

Manifesta 9. Limburg (2012)

Manifesta 10. Saint Petersburg (2014) in Russia created tensions as the government had just prohibited "gay propaganda".

Manifesta 11. Zürich (2016)

Manifesta 12. It was held in Palermo, Italy, around the theme "The Planetary Garden. Cultivating Coexistence". The exhibition put forward an interpretation of the city's history as the expression of a syncretism of cultures across the Mediterranean. The curators used the idea of the garden as a metaphor on how it might be possible to aggregate differences and to compose life out of movement and migration.

Manifesta 13. (planned to have been held in Marseille) cancelled due to Covid19.

Manifesta 14. It was held in Pristina, Kosovo, in 2022.

Manifesta 15. Barcelona (2024)

Manifesta 16 takes place in the Ruhr region of North Rhine-Westphalia, Germany, from 21 June to 4 October 2026. Under the title This is not a Church, the biennial is spread across four cities—Bochum, Essen, Gelsenkirchen and Duisburg—and uses former church buildings as venues for contemporary art and community projects. The edition focuses on the relationship between art, local communities and public space, including the reuse of buildings that have lost their original religious function.

== Education ==
Manifesta's Education and Mediation programme is a part of each Manifesta Biennial. The education team is among the first to begin developing programmes in Manifesta's host cities. The programmes created by the team are derived from conversations, extensive field research and sociocultural and educational mapping.

The programme is developed collaboratively with artists and associations of the host city and includes projects that are educational, curatorial, artistic, research-based, and accessible to everyone. The education team is responsible for developing a discursive mediation and a critical perspective on the curatorial project. Additionally the team creates a set of interrelated research-and-practice-based programmes focussed on local knowledge and practices.

== Editions ==
| Year | Edition | Place | Theme | Curated by |
|---|---|---|---|---|
| 1996 | 1st | Rotterdam | | Katalyn Neray; Rosa Martinez; Viktor Misiano; Andrew Renton; Hans-Ulrich Obrist |
| 1998 | 2nd | Luxembourg | | Robert Fleck; Maria Lind; Barbara Vanderlinden |
| 2000 | 3rd | Ljubljana | "Borderline Syndrome. Energies of Defence" | Francesco Bonami; Ole Bouman; Maria Hlavajová; Kathrin Rhomberg |
| 2002 | 4th | Frankfurt | | Iara Boubnova; Nuria Enguita Mayo; Stéphanie Moisdon |
| 2004 | 5th | San Sebastián | | Massimiliano Gioni; Marta Kuzma |
| 2006 | 6th | Nicosia | Cancelled | Florian Waldvogel; Mai Abu ElDahab; Anton Vidokle |
| 2008 | 7th | Franzensfeste Bolzano Trento Rovereto | "100 Miles in 100 Days" | Adam Budak Anselm Franke; Hila Peleg Raqs Media Collective |
| 2010 | 8th | Murcia | | Alexandria Contemporary Arts Forum (ACAF); Chamber of Public Secrets (CPS) tranzit.org |
| 2012 | 9th | Genk | | Cuauhtémoc Medina; Dawn Adès; Katerina Gregos |
| 2014 | 10th | Saint Petersburg | | Kasper König |
| 2016 | 11th | Zurich | "What People Do for Money: Some Joint Ventures" | Christian Jankowski; Francesca Gavin |
| 2018 | 12th | Palermo | "The Planetary Garden. Cultivating Coexistence" | Ippolito Pestellini Laparelli; Mirjam Varadinis; Andrés Jaque; Bregtje van der Haak |
| 2020 | 13th | Marseille | Indefinitely postponed due to the COVID-19 pandemic | Alya Sebti, Katerina Chuchalina, Stefan Kalmár |
| 2022 | 14th | Pristina | "It matters what worlds world worlds: how to tell stories otherwise" | Catherine Nichols; Carlo Ratti |
| 2024 | 15th | Barcelona | "Balancing Conflicts", "Cure and Care" and "Imagining Futures" | Sergio Pardo López Filipa Oliveira |
| 2026 | 16th | Ruhr | "This is not a Church" | Josep Bohigas |
| 2028 | 17th | Coimbra | | |

== Ownership ==
The Manifesta Biennial is owned and organized by Amsterdam-based International Foundation Manifesta (IFM).
