= Liisa Roberts =

French artist

Liisa Roberts (born 1969) is a Finnish-American artist. She was born in Paris, France, to a Finnish mother and an American father of Russian-Jewish descent.

== Work ==
Roberts is known for her installation works that use film. The visual style of her work has been called "a critique of minimalist phenomenology". (See minimalist and phenomenology.)

Roberts was included in the 2015 Venice Biennale. Her work is included in the collections of the Whitney Museum of American Art and the Museum of Modern Art, New York.
