= Andrew Renton =

British curator and academic

Prof. Andrew Renton BA PhD
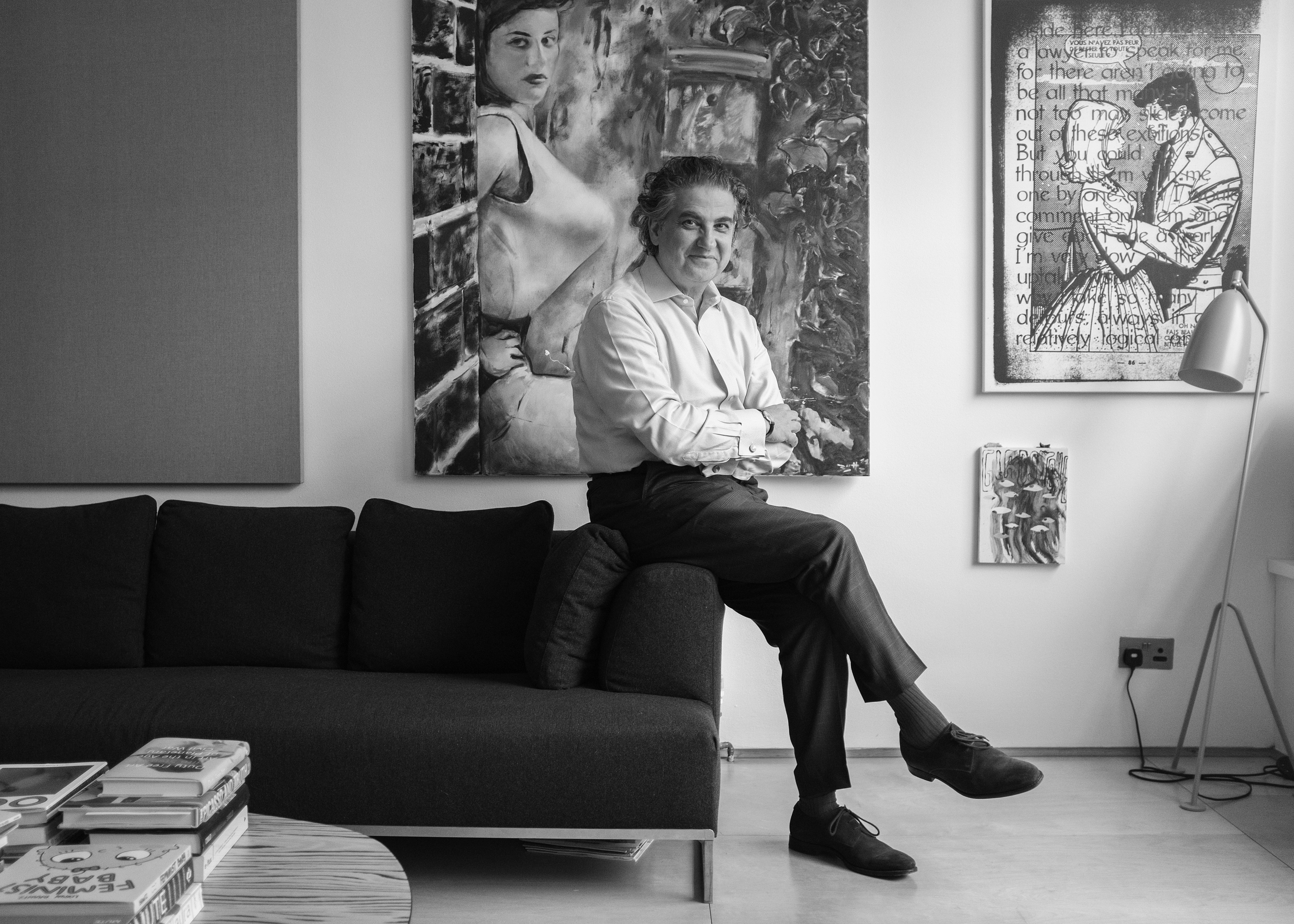
- Andrew Renton in April 2018
- Born: 1963 (age 62–63)
- Occupation: Professor
- Board member of: The Drawing Room; The Showroom

Academic background
- Education: University of Nottingham; University of Reading

Academic work
- Era: 20th–21st century
- Discipline: Art
- Sub-discipline: Curation
- Institutions: Slade School of Art; Goldsmiths, University of London; Marlborough Contemporary Gallery
- Notable students: Inigo Philbrick
- Main interests: British art
- Notable works: Technique Anglaise: Current Trends in British Art (1991)
- Website: gold.ac.uk

Andrew Renton (born 1963) is an art curator and Professor of Curating at Goldsmiths, University of London.

In 1984, Renton received a BA degree from the University of Nottingham, and in 1989, he received a PhD degree from the University of Reading.

Renton previously contributed a weekly column on art in the Evening Standard newsletter. He was the Slade Curator at the Slade School of Art before joining Goldsmiths. In 2003 at Goldsmiths, he took over running the Curating programme and redesigned it as an MFA programme. He also established a related practice-based PhD degree programme.

In 2006, Renton was a jury member for the Turner Prize. Until 2011, Renton was the adviser and curator for the Salem family's Cranford Collection.

In 2012, Renton became the founding Director of the Marlborough Contemporary Gallery in London, at the invitation of Gilbert Lloyd. He has curated around 30 exhibitions there.

Renton is a board member and trustee for several arts organisations, including The Drawing Room and The Showroom. He advises the UK Government Art Collection, among other institutions.

== Selected publications ==
- Technique Anglaise: Current Trends in British Art. Thames & Hudson, London, 1991. ISBN 0500973962 (edited with Liam Gillick)
