= Marijke van Warmerdam =

Dutch artist

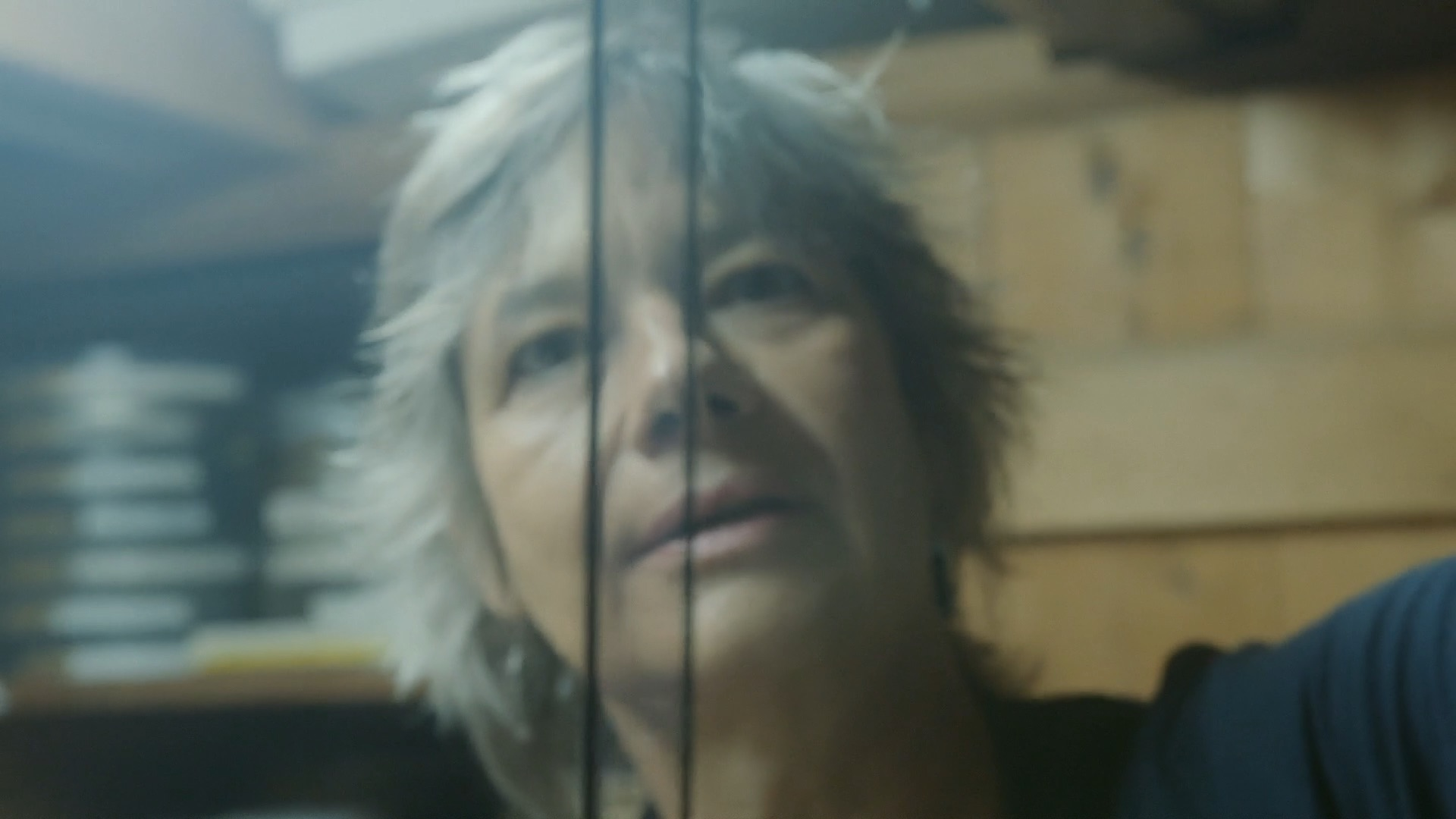
- Born: March 12, 1959 (age 67); Nieuwer-Amstel, The Netherlands
- Style: Contemporary art
- Website: marijkevanwarmerdam.com

Marijke van Warmerdam (born 12 March 1959, Nieuwer-Amstel) is a Dutch artist.

== Biography ==
Marijke van Warmerdam has been developing a characteristic body of work including film, photography, paintings and sculptures since the 1990’s. She is best known for her short film loops, with which she first garnered international attention at the Venice Bienniale in 1995. Shortly thereafter, her work Douche (Shower, 1995) was displayed for an extended period of time on one of the platforms of Schiphol Airport railway station, where thousands of travellers could see the film while waiting for their train. Van Warmerdam relies not on story-telling but on the visual power of the motif: a hat dancing in the wind, a drop of milk slowly dissolving in a glass of water, a girl doing a handstand or a red suitcase sliding down a snowy mountain. Through endless repetition, these seemingly trivial events take on a sculptural quality and an almost dreamlike beauty. In their simplicity, van Warmerdam’s sculptures, photo works and paintings are closely related to her film loops. Her view of the world is lighthearted, humorous and unexpected.

Van Warmerdam is a regular advisor at the Rijksakademie in Amsterdam and Professor of Art at the State Academy of Fine Arts in Karlsruhe, Germany.

== Exhibitions (selection) ==
In 1995, together with Marlene Dumas and Maria Roosen, she represented the Netherlands at the Venice Biennale. In addition, van Warmerdam has participated in numerous international exhibitions, including the Sydney, Berlin and Gwangju Biennales, and Documenta X. She has had solo exhibitions at the Van Abbemuseum in Eindhoven, the ICA in Boston, MAC in Marseille and The State Hermitage Museum in St. Petersburg, Russia. A retrospective of her work has been shown at Museum Boijmans Van Beuningen in Rotterdam, the Serralves Museum of Contemporary Art in Porto and Kunsthalle Düsseldorf.

== Works in public collections ==
Van Warmerdam’s work is represented in various international public collections:

Stedelijk Museum Amsterdam
TextielMuseum, Tilburg
Van Abbemuseum, Eindhoven
Museum De Domijnen, Sittard, The Netherlands
Huis Marseille, Amsterdam
Museum Boijmans van Beuningen, Rotterdam
MUDAM / Museé d'Art Moderne Grand-Duc Jean, Luxembourg
Pinault Collection, Paris
FRAC, Languedoc-Roussillon, Montpellier
FRAC Bretagne, Châteaugiron
Centre George Pompidou, Paris
MAC, Marseille
Staatliche Kunstsammlungen Dresden
Südwest LB forum, Stuttgart
Städtische Galerie, Karlsruhe
MUHKA, Antwerp
BOZAR, Brussels
SMAK, Ghent
Museum Horsens, Horsens, Denmark
New National Museum, Oslo
Castello di Rivoli, Turin
21st Century Museum of Contemporary Art, Kanazawa, Japan
Museu Serralves, Porto

== Awards ==
1988: Uriôt Prize
1992: Prix de Rome (Art & Public Space)
2004: David Roëll Award
