= Stella Bruzzi =

British academic

Stella Bruzzi, FBA (born 28 January 1962) is an Italian-born British scholar of film and media studies and currently Executive Dean of Arts and Humanities at University College London.

== Career ==
From 2006 to 2017, Bruzzi was Professor of Film and Television Studies at the University of Warwick. In 2017, she moved to University College London, where she is Executive Dean of its Faculty of Arts and Humanities. She has previously taught at the University of Manchester and at Royal Holloway, University of London.

== Honours ==
In 2013, Bruzzi was elected a Fellow of the British Academy (FBA), the United Kingdom's national academy for the humanities and social sciences.

== Selected works ==
- Bruzzi, Stella (1997). Undressing cinema: clothing and identity in the movies. London: Routledge. ISBN 978-0415139571.
- Bruzzi, Stella; Gibson, Pamela Church, eds. (2000). Fashion cultures: theories, explorations and analysis. London: Routledge. ISBN 978-0415206853.
- Bruzzi, Stella (2005). Bringing Up Daddy: Fatherhood and Masculinity in Postwar Hollywood. London: BFI. ISBN 978-1844571109.
- Bruzzi, Stella (2006). New Documentary (2nd ed.). London: Routledge. ISBN 978-0415385251.
- Bruzzi, Stella (2007). Seven Up. London: BFI. ISBN 978-1844571963.
- Bruzzi, Stella (2013). Men's Cinema: Masculinity and Mise-en-scene in Hollywood. Edinburgh: Edinburgh University Press. ISBN 978-0748676163.
- Bruzzi, Stella; Gibson, Pamela Church, eds. (2013). Fashion Cultures Revisited: Theories, Explorations and Analysis. New York: Routledge. ISBN 978-0415680066.
- Bruzzi, Stella (2020). Approximation: Documentary, History and the Staging of Reality. New York: Routledge. ISBN 978-0415688352.
- Bruzzi, Stella; Biriotti, Maurice, eds. (2022). Lockdown Cultures. London: UCL. ISBN 9781800083424.
