= Catherine David =

French art historian and curator

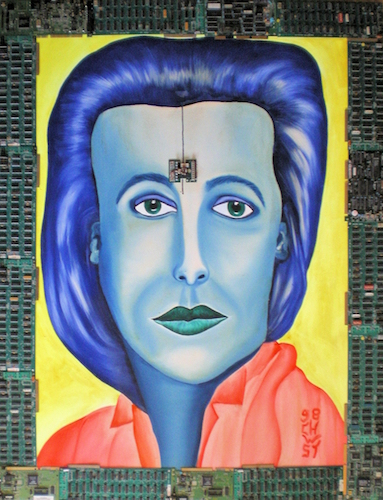
- Catherine David – Painting 1988 by Christian W. Staudinger
- Born: September 19, 1954 (age 72); Paris, France
- Education: Université de la Sorbonne, École du Louvre
- Occupations: Curator, art historian, museum director

Catherine David (born 19 September 1954) is a French art historian, curator and museum director. David was the first woman and the first non-German speaker to curate documenta X in Kassel, Germany (21 June – 28 September 1997). David was deputy director and head of the Globalisation Department at the National Museum of Modern Art (Musée National d'Art Moderne) at the Centre Georges Pompidou.

== Early life and education ==
David studied Spanish and Portuguese literature, linguistics and art history at the Université de la Sorbonne and the École du Louvre in Paris from 1972 to 1980.

== Career ==
=== National Museum of Modern Art, 1981–1990 ===
From 1981 to 1990 David was a curator at the National Museum of Modern Art (Musée National d'Art Moderne), Centre Pompidou, Paris.

She curated a number of exhibitions at the museum including "Jean Pierre Bertrand" (1985), "Reinhard Mucha" (1986), "L’Epoque, La Mode, La Moral, La Passion" (1987), and "Passages de L’Image"(1990).

=== Jeu de Paume, 1990–1994 ===
From 1990 to 1994, she worked at the National Gallery of the Jeu de Paume (Galerie Nationale du Jeu de Paume), also in Paris, where she organized several solo and group exhibitions including: "Reinhard Mucha, Passages de l'image"; "Stan Douglas: Monodramas and Television Spots"; "Marcel Broodthaers"; "Hélio Oiticica"; "Eva Hesse"; "Jeff Wall and Chantal Ackerman: D'Est", among others. In the 1990s, she took part to a worldwide movement with Okwui Enwezor, judging art according to natural disasters, migration policies and gender war.

=== Documenta X, 1994–1997 ===
In 1994 David was appointed artistic director of documenta X in Kassel, staged in the summer of 1997. She made headlines in the international art world with her original approach to documenta, where she brought her cross-sector discipline to the exhibition, inviting writers, sociologists and architects, as well as artists, to speak over the 100-day exhibition. For the first time a website was conceived as a part of the exhibition, curate by the artist and Swiss curator Simon Lamunière. Documenta X still is one of the most relevant major exhibitions of the 20th Century, a place where the ideas of Center and Periphery, Modern and Pre-Modern could be examined and understood. Catherine David lead the way to show what "political art" means, and inspired the programme of a good number of museums around Europe in the early 21st Century.

=== Later career ===
In 1999, David went on to curate the film and video program of the XXIV Biennial of São Paulo. The following year she organized "The State of Things" for the KW Institute for Contemporary Art, Berlin. In 2002, she took over as Director of the Witte de With Center for Contemporary Art in Rotterdam where she remained until 2004. David was a Guest professor in 2004 and 2005 at the Humboldt University in Berlin, and she was a fellow at the Wissenschaftskolleg in Berlin in 2005 and 2006. Over several years, she was chief curator of the Musées de France (French Museum Board). She was also artistic director of the 2009 Lyon Biennale.

Turning her focus to the Middle East, David became Director of the long-term project "Contemporary Arab Representations" (Représentations Arabes Contemporaines ) in 1998, an initiative presenting contemporary Middle East and Arab artists, first shown at the Fundació Antoni Tàpies in Barcelona. In 2006, she staged the exhibition "The Iraqi Equation" in Berlin and Barcelona. In December 2007, she curated "DI / VISIONS. Culture and politics in the Middle East" at the Haus der Kulturen der Welt in Berlin, which aimed to break down the Western stereotype of Arab culture. In 2008, she received the Award for Curatorial Excellence from Bard College. In 2009 she organized a retrospective in honor of the Iranian photographer Bahman Jalali, again at the Fundació Antoni Tàpies, Barcelona and was artistic director of the first national presentation of the ADACH (Abu Dhabi Authority for Culture and Heritage) at the Venice Biennale. In March 2011 she organized Hassan Sharif's exhibition "Experiments & Objects 1979-2011" at the ADACH Exhibition hall in Abu Dhabi and launched the first monographic publication of the artist in Venice Biennale 2011. In 2013, David presented "MARWAN – Early Works 1962-1972" at the Beirut Exhibition Center and at the Serralves Foundation in 2014.

In 2014 David curated "UNEDITED HISTORY, Iran 1960-2014" at the Musée d'Art Moderne de la Ville de Paris. Earlier in the year it was announced that David would be returning to Centre Pompidou with her appointment as the deputy director and head of global outreach for the National Museum of Modern Art (Musée National d'Art Moderne), replacing Catherine Grenier.

In 2016, she curated "Reframing Modernism" at the National Gallery Singapore. It was a collaboration with more than 200 art works from the Centre Pompidou in Paris and the National Gallery Singapore.

== Other activities ==
David was a member of the advisory committee of MACBA in Barcelona from 2015-2021. She is member of the advisory committee of the Saradar Collection, devoted to Lebanese art from the contemporary and modern periods, and of NTU Centre for Contemporary Art Singapore directed by Ute Meta Bauer.

In 2018, David was among a group of more than 60 artists and art professionals who spoke out in an open letter against the suspension of Catherine de Zegher as director of the Museum of Fine Arts, Ghent, after news reports revealed that the museum had put on a show including what may be fake artworks attributed to Russian avant-garde artists.
