= Haus der Kulturen der Welt =

Exhibition space and events venue in Berlin

Coordinates: 52°31′08″N 13°21′55″E

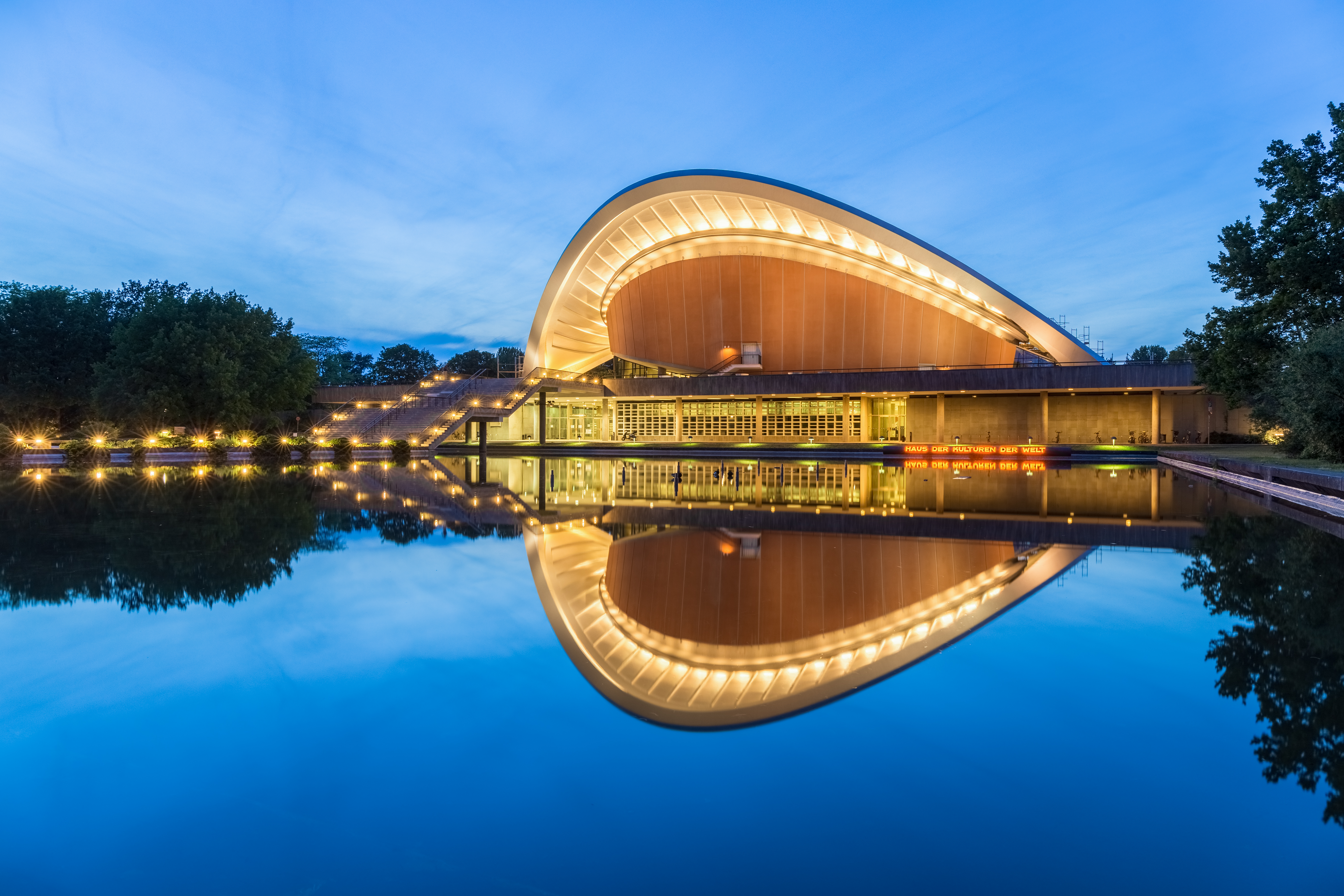
Haus der Kulturen der Welt, Berlin

Haus der Kulturen der Welt, Berlin

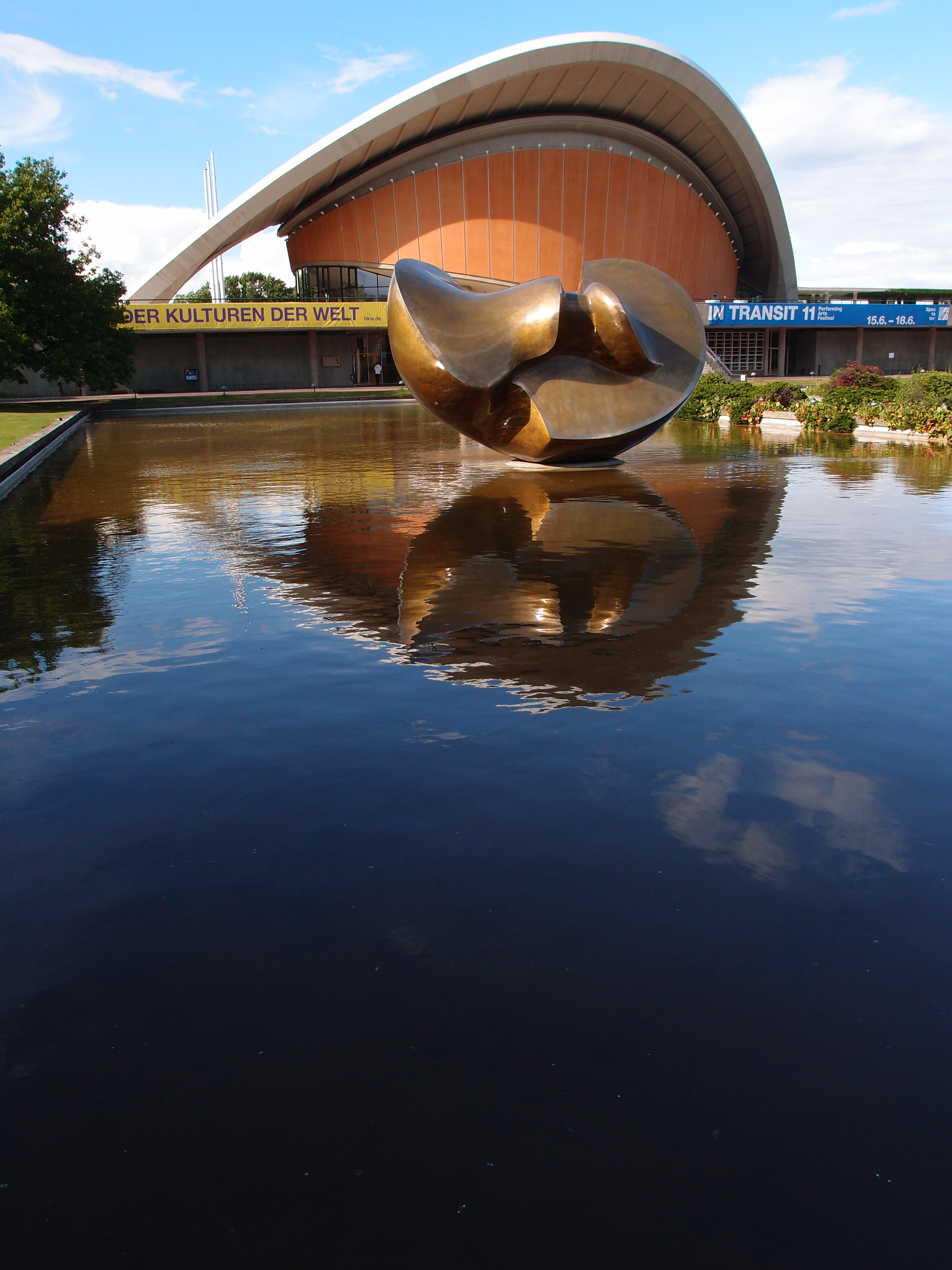
Henry Moore's sculpture, Large Divided Oval: Butterfly in front of the Haus der Kulturen der Welt

The Haus der Kulturen der Welt (HKW), in English House of World Cultures, in Berlin is Germany's national center for the presentation and discussion of international contemporary arts, with a special focus on non-European cultures and societies. It presents art exhibitions, theater and dance performances, concerts, author readings, films and academic conferences on visual art and culture. It is one of the institutions which, due to their national and international standing and the quality of their work, receive funding from the federal government as so-called "lighthouses of culture", from the Federal Minister of State for Culture and the Media as well as from the Federal Foreign Office. As a venue and collaboration partner, HKW has hosted festivals such as the transmediale, curatorial platforms, biennials such as the Berlin Documentary Forum, and mentorship programs such as Forecast. Since 2013, its interdisciplinary elaboration on the Anthropocene discourse has included conferences, exhibitions, and other artistic formats performed together with philosophers, scientists, and artists, such as Bruno Latour and Hans Joachim Schellnhuber.

== Location and history ==
The Haus der Kulturen der Welt is located in the Tiergarten park, and directly neighbors the Carillon and the new German Chancellery.

The Institut für Sexualwissenschaft of Magnus Hirschfeld occupied the grounds before World War II. In remembrance of the institute a bar inside Hause der Kulturen der Welt is named Magnus Hirschfeld Bar and a garden is named after Lili Elbe.

It was formerly known as the Kongresshalle conference hall, a gift from the United States, designed in 1957 by the American architect Hugh Stubbins as a part of the Interbau, an International Building Exhibition. U.S. President John F. Kennedy spoke here at a trade union meeting during his June 1963 visit to West Berlin. On 21 May 1980, the roof collapsed, killing a Sender Freies Berlin radio station journalist and injuring numerous people. The hall was rebuilt in its original style and reopened in 1987 in time for the 750-year anniversary of the founding of Berlin.

== Henry Moore sculpture ==
Outside the entrance, Henry Moore's heaviest bronze sculpture, Large Divided Oval: Butterfly (1985–86), stands in the middle of a water basin. Weighing nearly nine tons, it was his final major work, completed just before he died. One of three public Moore sculptures in Berlin (the others being Three Way Piece No.2: The Archer (1964–65) at the Neue Nationalgalerie and Reclining Figure (1956) at the Akademie der Künste), Butterfly was initially a loan to (then West) Berlin in 1986, but the city council wanted the sculpture permanently, and asked Moore if he would donate it. The letter arrived just before his death and went unanswered. In 1988 it was sold by the Henry Moore Foundation to Berlin for 4.5 million Deutsche Mark (around $2.58 million at the exchange rate of the day), then a huge sum for a public sculpture. The sculpture was eventually badly damaged by a combination of environmental pollution and vandalism, and restored in 2010.

== In popular culture ==
On 2 September 1970, the Kongresshalle was the setting for the West German heat of TV's Jeux Sans Frontières.

Typical of Berlin's popular humor, Berliners have nicknamed the building Die schwangere Auster ("The pregnant Oyster") or "Jimmy Carter's smile".

In 2005 the building served as an outdoor set for the science fiction action film Æon Flux.

== See also ==
- International Literature Award
- Thin-shell structure
- List of thin-shell structures
