= Television: A Challenge to the Psychoanalytic Establishment =

Two texts by psychoanalyst Jacques Lacan

- Editor: Joan Copjec
- Author: Jacques Lacan
- Original title: Télévision
- Translators: Denis Hollier; Rosalind Krauss; Annette Michelson; Jeffrey Mehlman
- Cover artist: Carlo De Lucia (design)
- Subject: Psychoanalysis
- Published: 1974 Éditions du Seuil; 1990 (in English)
- Media type: Print (Hardback)
- Pages: 134
- ISBN: 0-393-02496-2
- OCLC: 19975760

Television: A Challenge to the Psychoanalytic Establishment is the 1990 English-language translation of Jacques Lacan's text "Télévision" accompanied by a "Dossier on the Institutional Debate". The single volume thus includes two distinct projects which were separately translated.

== Lacan's "Television" ==
In 1973, the film maker Benoît Jacquot approached Jacques Lacan via Jacques-Alain Miller with the idea of making a film on Lacan and his teaching. Lacan soon agreed to the project, which ultimately took the form of Miller posing questions to which Lacan replied at some length in a semi-improvised manner. The final edited film, commissioned by the ORTF, was broadcast in two parts on prime-time television (8.30pm on two consecutive Saturday evenings) under the title "Psychanalyse".

The text "Télévision" is a partially re-written transcription of the filmed dialogue between Miller and Lacan, with marginalia added by the former. It was published as a small book by Éditions du Seuil, and later included in the 2001 collection Autres écrits, confirming its status as one of Lacan's "written" texts as opposed to a simple transcription of an oral delivery. Lacan added the epigraph "He who interrogates me / also knows how to read me", in reference to Jacques-Alain Miller.

The English-language translation by Denis Hollier, Rosalind Krauss and Annette Michelson was first published in Issue 40 of October Journal in 1987 under the editorship of Joan Copjec.

== "A Challenge to the Psychoanalytic Establishment": Dossier on the Institutional Debate ==
In January 1977, the French journal Ornicar ? edited by Jacques-Alain Miller published two supplements: on the 1953 "Scission" of the Société française de psychanalyse from the Paris Psychoanalytic Society (the French branch of the International Psychoanalytic Association); and on Lacan's 1963 "Excommunication" from the latter.

A selection of these texts, together with some key institutional material relating to Lacan's École freudienne de Paris, were translated by Jeffrey Mehlman and included in the above-mentioned October volume.

The Dossier includes:

- Lacan's 1953 Letters to his former analyst Rudolph Loewenstein and the then President of the IPA, Heinz Hartmann.
- Hartmann's Report to the XVIIIth Congress of the IPA.
- Lacan's 1960 Letter to D. W. Winnicott who had served on the first committee of the IPA evaluating the situation of the SFP.
- Lacan's single lesson titled "Introduction to the Names-of-the-Father Seminar" delivered on 20 November 1963, the day after he learnt of his definitive stripping of the title of training analyst.
- Lacan's 1964 "Founding Act" of the EFP.
- Lacan's 1980 "Letter of Dissolution" of the EFP.

This important document constitutes the fullest record of the circumstances of Lacan's stripping of the title of training analyst in 1963, including first-hand historical elements that point beyond the oft-cited issue of Lacan's variable-length sessions.

== The 1990 Norton volume ==
In 1990, W.W. Norton & Co. re-published Issue 40 of the October journal as a hardback book. The collection includes an introductory text by Jacques-Alain Miller, "Microscopia" (translated by Bruce Fink), and an introduction to the Institutional Debate by Joan Copjec.

== See also ==
- Seminars of Jacques Lacan
- Psychoanalytic theory
