= Paul Chan (artist) =

American artist, writer and publisher (born 1973)

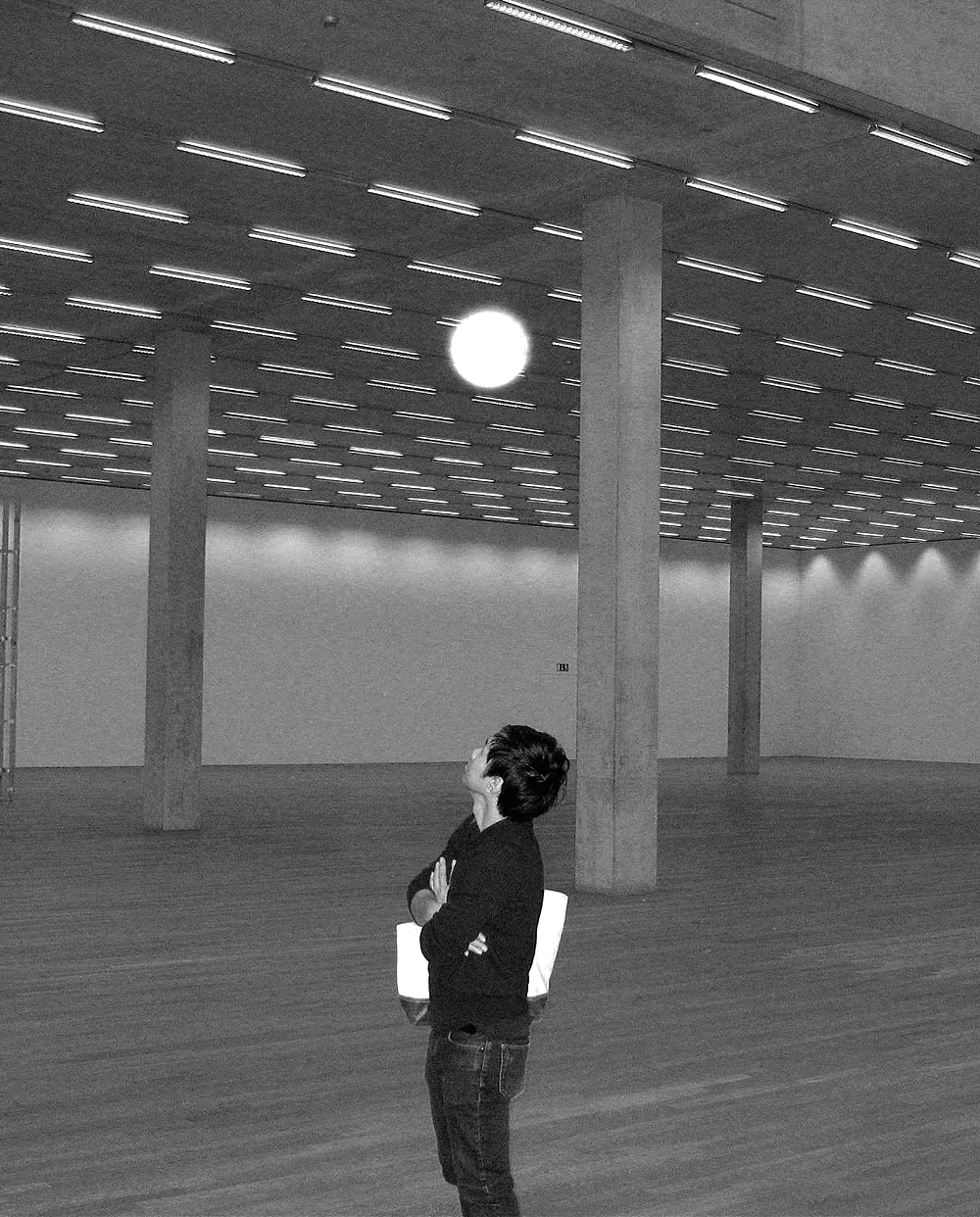
- Chan in 2013
- Born: April 12, 1973 (age 53); Hong Kong
- Education: School of the Art Institute of Chicago (BFA); Bard College (MFA)
- Occupations: Contemporary artist, writer, publisher
- Notable work: Waiting for Godot in New Orleans; 7 Lights
- Awards: MacArthur Fellowship (2022); Hugo Boss Prize (2014); Alpert Award in the Arts (2009); Foundation for Contemporary Arts Grants to Artists award (2006)

Paul Chan (born April 12, 1973) is an American artist, writer and publisher. His single channel videos, projections, animations and multimedia projects are influenced by outsider artists, playwrights, and philosophers such as Henry Darger, Samuel Beckett, Theodor W. Adorno, and Marquis de Sade. Chan's work concerns topics including geopolitics, globalization, and their responding political climates, war documentation, violence, deviance, and pornography, language, and new media.

Chan has exhibited his work at the Venice Biennale, the Whitney Biennial, documenta, the Serpentine Gallery, the Museum of Modern Art, the New Museum, and other institutions. Chan is represented by Greene Naftali Gallery, New York. Chan has also engaged in a variety of publishing projects, and, in 2010, founded the art and ebook publishing company Badlands Unlimited, based in New York. Chan's essays and interviews have appeared in Artforum, Frieze, Flash Art, October, Tate, Parkett, Texte Zur Kunst, Bomb, and other magazines and journals.

He was awarded a MacArthur Fellowship in 2022 and appointed to the board of the Andy Warhol Foundation for the Visual Arts in October 2024.

== Childhood and education ==
Chan was born in Hong Kong in 1973. Hong Kong's air quality had a deleterious effect on Chan's health, so his family relocated to Sioux City, Iowa in 1980, and later moved to Omaha, Nebraska.

Chan attended the School of the Art Institute of Chicago from 1992 to 1996, receiving a BFA in Video/Digital Arts. Chan served as editor of the school newspaper F for three years. Chan attended Bard College beginning in 2000 and graduated with an MFA in 2002.

== Career ==
Chan's career as an artist can be roughly divided into three periods: his early works, up until 2009; his “hiatus” period, stretching from 2009 until the 2014, during which he established his publishing company Badlands Unlimited, and his “Return to art” period, from 2016 on, during which his work abandoned using video projections and computer screens.

=== Early works ===
In 1999, Chan launched his personal website, www.nationalphilistine.com. The website would become the platform from which he distributed videos, animations, fonts and other works for free. One such project was Alternumerics (2000), a series of fonts available for use on Macs and PCs that transform what the user types into both legible and illegible blocks of text that explore both the "relationship between language and interactivity" and the "fissure between what we write and what we mean." Another was Now Let Us Praise American Leftists (2000), a 3-minute 35 second experimental animation that sought to "eulogize and ridicule the American leftist movement of the past century.

Chan completed his 18-minute animation Happiness (Finally) After 35,000 Years of Civilization in 2002. In 2003, the animation became the first of Chan's works to be shown in an art gallery (Greene Naftali). When it was shown, the animation was played in a loop and projected on a "floating screen shaped and textured like a torn scroll." The characters and events in the animation are heavily influenced by Henry Darger's novel The Story of the Vivian Girls. Happiness received a warm critical reception.

Following a 2002 trip to Iraq with the anti-war activists Voices in the Wilderness, Chan's work became increasingly concerned with war and politics. Re: The Operation (2002) is Chan's interpretation of what he imagined members of the Bush administration would look like were they fighting and being wounded in Afghanistan. The video consists of still images of Chan's drawings overlaid with audio and text. Baghdad in no Particular Order (2003) was created with footage Chan took of Baghdad while on his trip to Iraq. The video was composed of shots of ordinary life in Baghdad. Chan's third video in the same vein was Now Promise Now Threat (2005), a video consisting of clips of interviews of residents of Omaha, Nebraska. The interviews focused on the political climate of Nebraska, a deeply Republican state. Chan gathered Re: The Operation, Baghdad in no Particular Order, and Now Promise Now Threat into a single collection he named The Tin Drum Trilogy. Despite major differences in the "form, philosophy" and "spirit" of the three videos, Chan put them together as a trilogy connected by what he felt was "the room temperature of the times," as was the form expressed in Gunter Grass' novel The Tin Drum (1959).

In October 2004 Chan had his solo exhibition debut at Greene Naftali Gallery. It was there that he premiered My Birds...Trash...The Future (2004), a 17-minute two-channel animation featuring characters based on murder victims Pier Paolo Pasolini and Biggie Smalls adrift in a bleak landscape populated by a lone tree, birds from the Biblical book of Leviticus, hunters, and paparazzi in yellow Hummers. The animation was projected on both sides of a fourteen-foot long screen. The audio for the animation was broadcast from the muzzle of a toy gun that required viewers to lift it to one of their ears in order to hear it. The animation was accompanied by charcoal drawings and prints of birds.

1st ~~Light~~ (2005), from the series 7 ~~Lights~~, at the Baltimore Museum of Art in 2022

In 2005, Chan began 7 ~~Lights~~ a series of large-scale projected animations based on the Biblical seven days of Creation. In a formal break with his previous animations, Chan designed 7 ~~Lights~~ to be projected on the walls and floor of its venue, instead of on a rectangular screen. The animations forgo the hard-edged color and line of the previous animated works and are instead composed solely of light and moving shadows in the shapes of humans, animals, and consumer goods. In 2007, Chan debuted all seven of the projections of the 7 ~~Lights~~ series at the Serpentine Gallery in 2007. The projections were accompanied by charcoal drawings and collages of the projections of the series re-imagined as musical scores.

Chan's first trip to New Orleans was in 2006, a year after Hurricane Katrina. Having witnessed desolate neighborhoods and city residents still waiting for help, Chan was inspired to stage a production of Samuel Beckett's Waiting for Godot on the city streets themselves. While he organized the production with Creative Time and the Classical Theater of Harlem, Chan began living in New Orleans and teaching for free at Xavier University and the University of New Orleans. He started a "shadow fund" with Creative Time that matched the production cost of the play and was later donated to organizations in New Orleans involved in post-Katrina recovery. Godot premiered in the Lower Ninth Ward on Friday, November 2, 2007.

Chan's second solo show at Greene Naftali Gallery in 2009 featured a nearly six-hour-long looping projected animation titled Sade for Sade's Sake (2009). The animation is composed of shadows in the shape of naked human figures "gyrating in various states of sexual frenzy. Parallels were drawn by critics between the violent sexual orgies depicted in Sade and the abuse of prisoners at Abu Ghraib. In addition to the animation, the exhibition included a number of pen and ink and charcoal drawings. My Laws are My Whores (2009) is an installation of nine charcoal portraits of the justices of the Supreme Court of the United States. In a return to his earlier Alternumerics project, Chan produced a collection of fonts based on the writings of Marquis de Sade.

=== Hiatus ===
Following Sade for Sade's Sake, Chan took a hiatus from art making, an act comparable to Marcel Duchamp's "retirement." Chan used his time away from the Art World to found the publishing company Badlands Unlimited in 2010. In an interview with The Believer magazine, Chan said, “I always wanted to publish books but I never had the money. I also never had the time. And so, after my last show, in 2009, I quit making art. It was time. I stopped making new work, and I stopped taking on opportunities to show my works. I essentially retired. [I] wanted to do nothing in particular, exhibition-wise. The old work gets shown. I’ve turned down most opportunities to do anything, because I wanted more than anything else the thing one can never have enough of: time. It is of course wonderful and gratifying to have shows and exhibitions and to travel and partake in the excitement that makes contemporary art interesting. And then you realize that a carrot isn’t a carrot. A carrot is a stick.”

Badlands Unlimited has since published over 50 paper books, e-books, and artist editions, including works of Etel Adnan, Cory Arcangel, Bernadette Corporation, Ian Cheng, Petra Cortright, Aruna D’Souza, Marcel Duchamp, Carroll Dunham, Claudia La Rocco, Hans Ulrich Obrist, Craig Owens, Yvonne Rainer, Rachel Rose, Dread Scott, Cauleen Smith, Martine Syms, Lynne Tillman, and Calvin Tomkins.

=== Return to art ===
Chan ended his hiatus in April 2014 with the opening of the six-month-long show "Selected Works" in Schaulager, Basel. His two collections of sculptural installations Arguments (2012 - 2013) and Nonprojections (2012 – 2013) hark back to his earlier animated projections with the inclusion of working projectors as sculptural components.

In November 2014, Chan was awarded the Hugo Boss Prize. Asked to comment on winning the prize, Chan responded, “I’m afraid the success comes from a complete misunderstanding of my work.”

The following year, Chan exhibited at the Guggenheim Museum in New York as part of the prize. He chose to show new work rather than older, better-known works from his earlier period. Chan calls these new works “Breathers.” Each Breather consists of a fabric shell attached to one or more specially modified fans. According to Chan, he employs techniques from fashion design, physics, and other fields to influence how the air flows from the fans to create different kinds of motion. Chan has talked about making the Breathers as his way of steering clear of making “screen images.” He has talked about the “regressive” nature of moving image works and has referred to the ubiquity of screens, from smartphones to computers, as contributing to a kind of “fatigue.” Chan said in an interview: “Someone recently coined the phrase “peak screen,” meaning that we’ve reached a stage where screens dominate our social lives so much that we’ve become fatigued by them. Even the companies that make them, like Apple or Google or Samsung, know that the profits from TVs and smartphones have plateaued. That's partly why there's been such a push for audio assistants like Siri and Alexa. Corporations know we’ve become so fatigued from looking at a screen that we'll no longer purchase devices. I got that fatigue six or seven years ago. One of the reasons I stopped making art was because I had to use screens for making moving-image works for video projection, and I couldn't bear to look at them anymore. I first stopped making work, and then when I started again, I didn't make any screen works. How was I going to continue making work if I could no longer bear to look at the form that I historically used? The Breathers are my solution. It took around four years of research and development to figure out how much control I had of these animations. I wanted to control the movement of these works as nimbly as I could control the animations when I was working on a computer.”

In 2018, Chan collaborated with the Greek-based non profit organization NEON to present Odysseus and the Bathers, an exhibition curated by Sam Thorne, Director of Nottingham Contemporary at the Museum of Cycladic Art in Athens, Greece. The artist presented a body of new and recent works, which he calls “breathers” and “bathers”. Each figure is composed of a fabric “body” designed by Chan and attached to specially modified fans. These kinetic sculptural works act like moving images in three dimensions.

Chan is one of six artist-curators who made selections for Artistic License: Six Takes on the Guggenheim Collection, on view at the Solomon R. Guggenheim Museum from May 24, 2019 through January 12, 2020.

== Solo exhibitions ==
- Drawings for Word Book by Ludwig Wittgenstein, Greene Naftali Gallery, 2020.
- Odysseus and the Bathers, NEON at the Museum of Cycladic Art. July - October 2018
- Paul Chan: Rhi Anima, Greene Naftali Gallery, 2017.
- Paul Chan: Hippias Minor, Deste Foundation Project Space, Slaughterhouse, Hydra, 2015.
- The Hugo Boss Prize 2014: Paul Chan, Nonprojections for New Lovers, Guggenheim, 2014
- Paul Chan - Selected Works. Schaulager, Basel, Switzerland, 2014.
- Sade for Sade's Sake. Greene Naftali Gallery, New York, 2009.
- My laws are my whores. Renaissance Society at the University of Chicago, 2009.
- Paul Chan: The 7 Lights. New Museum, 2008.
- Paul Chan: The 7 Lights. Serpentine Gallery, London, 2007.
- Lights and Drawings. Stedelijk Museum Amsterdam, March–June 2007.

== Collection ==
Chan's work is held in the following public collections:

- Guggenheim Museum, New York
- The Museum of Modern Art, New York
- The Whitney Museum of American Art, New York
- The Institute of Contemporary Art, Boston
- Carnegie Museum of Art, Pittsburgh
- The Art Institute of Chicago
- The Walker Art Center, Minneapolis
- Museum of Contemporary Art, Los Angeles
- Hammer Museum, Los Angeles
- The Art Gallery of Ontario, Toronto
- The Stedelijk Museum, Amsterdam
- Bonnefantenmuseum, Maastricht

== Activism and controversy ==
Along with his history as an exhibiting artist, Chan has worked with a number of different political and activist movements. In 1997, Chan supported the Teamsters-led UPS strike in Chicago.

=== Anti-war activities ===
From 2002 to 2006, Chan was part of an American aid and activist group that opposed the US-led invasions and is called Voices in the Wilderness, and he worked in Baghdad in 2002.

On February 13, 2003, teams of artists and activists posted photos of Iraqis that Chan had taken during his trip to Iraq around New York City and other cities around the world. This activity became known as "Snapshot Action," and was meant to show passersby real people in Iraq who might die if Iraq were to be invaded. Artists Emilie Clark and Lytle Shaw were arrested for a "quality of life infraction" for taping a photo to a metal lamppost.

On August 12, 2005 a US federal judge ordered Voices in the Wilderness to pay $20,000 in fines for violating sanctions against Iraq.

=== Journalism ===
Chan was a co-founder of the New York chapter of the Independent Media Center.

In 2004, Chan collaborated with Josh Breitbart, Nadxi Mannello, and Elise Gardella to create A People's Guide to The Republican National Convention (2004).

In 2011, Chan helped recruit volunteers to get involved with what would become known as The Occupied Wall Street Journal, a free newsletter written and distributed by Occupy volunteers.

In 2011, Chan was one of several artists to conduct an interview with Julian Assange. Assange is under investigation by US authorities for publishing classified documents leaked by Chelsea Manning.

=== Gun Reform Protest ===
In 2018 the artist and his publishing outfit Badlands Unlimited have produced banners for New York student activists involved in the National School Walkout protest on March 14, and the March for our Lives demonstration on 24 March.

=== Other controversies ===
Art Review commissioned Chan to create an image for their annual Power 100 issue in 2014, but then refused to run the issue with the image on the cover in fear that it would offend readers.

== Bibliography ==
2006

- Chan, Paul, and Martha Rosler. 2006. Paul Chan, Martha Rosler. New York: A.R.T. Press. OCLC 70912260

2007

- Chan, Paul, and Melissa Larner. 2007. Paul Chan: The 7 Lights. Cologne: Verlag Der Buchhandung Walther König. OCLC 214303556
- Chan, Paul. "Fearless Symmetry." Artforum 45, no. 7 (2007): 260.
- Chan, Paul. "Paul Chan on Betrayal." Art Review, June 1, 2007, 40.
- Chan, Paul. 2007. The Shadow and Her Wanda: Story and Pictures and Footnotes (strictly for Children). London: König. OCLC 180744573

2008

- Chan, Paul. "Next Day, Same Place: After Godot in New Orleans." TDR: The Drama Review 52, no. 4 (2008): 2–3.
- Chan, Paul. "Trembling Before Time: On the Drawings of Paul Sharits." Parkett, 2008, 8-12.

2009

- "What Art Is and Where It Belongs by Paul Chan." In The Return of Religion and Other Myths: A Critical Reader in Contemporary Art, edited by Maria Hlavajova, Sven Lütticken, and Jill Winder, 56–71. Utrecht, Netherlands: BAK, Basis Voor Actuele Kunst, 2009.
- Chan, Paul. "The Spirit of Recession." October, July 1, 2009, 3-12.

2010

- Biesenbach, Klaus, Cornelia H. Butler, and Neville Wakefield. "A Time Apart by Paul Chan." In Greater New York 2010, 84–85. New York: MoMA PS1 and the Museum of Modern Art, 2010.
- Chan, Paul. Phaedrus Pron. Brooklyn, N.Y: Badlands Unlimited, 2010. OCLC 769442156
- Chan, Paul. "Private View: Henri Michaux." Tate Etc., April 1, 2010, 58–59.
- Chan, Paul. "Miracles, Forces, Attractions, Reconsidered." Texte Zur Kunst, September 1, 2010.
- Chan, Paul. The Essential and Incomplete Sade for Sade's Sake. 2010. New York: Badlands Unlimited. OCLC 698170992
- Chan, Paul. "The Unthinkable Community." E-flux. January 1, 2010.
- Chan, Paul. 2010. Waiting for Godot in New Orleans: a field guide. Köln: Walther König. OCLC 656778427

2011

- Chan, Paul. "X Jxm Vlr Rpb Pelria Ilpb Vlr." Art Journal. April 20, 2011.
- Chan, Paul. "A Lawless Proposition." E-flux. December 1, 2011.
- Chan, Paul. "Progress as Regression." E-flux. January 1, 2011.
- Chan, Paul, and Sven Lütticken. "Idiot Wind: An Introduction." E-flux. January 1, 2011.

2012

- Chan, Paul. "Wanderlusting." Art in America. June 1, 2012.
- Chan, Paul. "Occupy Response". October. October 1, 2012.
- Chan, Paul, Daniel Birnbaum, Heidi Naef, Isabel Friedli, Catherine Schelbert, Suzanne Schmidt, and Tarcisius Schelbert. 2014. Paul Chan: selected works. Basel: Laurenz-Foundation, Schaulager OCLC 879597016

2014

- Chan, Paul. "The Cat and the Owl: Remembering Chris Marker". October, July 1, 2014, 149: 181–191

2016

- Chan, Paul. "The Potency of Art". Social Research: An International Quarterly, June 15, 2016, 83: 149–152.
- Chan, Paul. "Second Nature". October, January 1, 2016, 155: 151–161.

2017

- "Letters on Frieze London: Paul Chan and Zachary Small Respond". Hyperallergic. October 10, 2017.
- Chan, Paul. "Odysseus as Artist". Los Angeles Review of Books. December 21, 2017.

2018

- Allais, Lucia; Anderson, Noel W.; Weiner, Andrew; Bruguera, Tania; Burr, Tom; Carroll, Mary Ellen; Cassils; Chan, Paul; Cole, Andrew. "A Questionnaire on Monuments". October. August 1, 2018, 165: 3–177.

2019

- Chan, Paul. "The spirit and the damage done: On Bruce Nauman's 100 Live and Die by Paul Chan - BOMB Magazine". bombmagazine.org, March 22, 2019.
- Chan, Paul. "Our Data, Our Selves". Los Angeles Review of Books. September 19, 2019.

2020

- Chan, Paul. "Letter to Young Artists During a Global Pandemic". 4Columns. April 19, 2020.
- Chan, Paul. "My Year of Metaphysical Thinking". frieze. May 8, 2020, 211: 72–77.

== Bibliography ==
- Chan, P. and Funcke, B. (2020). Word Book by Ludwig Wittgenstein. New York: Badlands Unlimited.
- Chan, P. (2019). Odysseus and the bathers. New York: Badlands Unlimited.
- Chan, P., Fletcher, R. and Marta, K. (2015). Hippias Minor or The Art Of Cunning: A New Translation. New York: Badlands Unlimited.
- Chan, P. and Baker, G. (2014). Selected writings 2000-2014. Basel: Laurenz Foundation, Schaulager.
- Chan, P. (2014). New New Testament. New York: Badlands Unlimited.
- Chan, P. (2010). Phaedrus Pron. New York: Badlands Unlimited.
- Chan, P. (2010). The essential and incomplete Sade for Sade's sake. New York: Badlands Unlimited.
- Chan, P. (2010). Waiting for Godot in New Orleans. New York: Badlands Unlimited.

== Sources ==
- Asmar, Ranya. "Paul Chan Interview." Artbook. March 28, 2012. http://www.artbook.com/blog-paul-chan-e-book-interview.html.
- Bellini, Andrea. "Paul Chan: Where Form Ends and Content Begins." Flash Art, March 1, 2005, 68–70.
- Boyle, Deirdre. "The Advocate and the Artist Talk about Poetry and Justice." Speakeasy, July 1, 2006, 18–22.
- Carlson, Ben. "Making Worlds: Interview with Paul Chan." Dossier, January 1, 2009, 115–16.
- Cattelan, Maurizio. "Some Things Just Stick in Your Mind." Flash Art, October 1, 2008, 110–13.
- Edwards, Natalie. "Paul Chan: Quantity Is Not Quality." F Newsmagazine. March 23, 2007. http://fnewsmagazine.com/2007-apr/q&a--the-yes-men-s-andy-bichlbaum-and-paul-chan.php.
- Fogle, Douglas. "Paul Chan in Conversation with Eungie Joo." In Life on Mars: 55th Carnegie International. Pittsburgh, Pa.: Carnegie Museum of Art, 2008.
- Hanru, Hou, and Hans-Ulrich Obrist. "Paul Chan in the Uncertain States of America." ARTit, April 1, 2006, 108–09.
- Hromack, Sarah. "A Thing Remade: A Conversation with Paul Chan." Rhizome. August 25, 2011. http://rhizome.org/editorial/2011/aug/25/a-thing-remade-conversation-paul-chan/
- Hullot-Kentor, Robert. "Robert Hullot-Kentor with Paul Chan." The Brooklyn Rail. March 1, 2007. http://www.brooklynrail.org/2007/03/art/robert-hullot.
- La Rocco, Claudia. "An Interview." The Brooklyn Rail, July 8, 2010, 22–26.
- McClister, Nell. "Interview Paul Chan." BOMB Magazine, July 1, 2005, 22–29.
- Molesworth, Helen Anne. "A Conversation between Paul Chan and Helen Molesworth." In Dance/draw. Ostfildern, Germany;: Hatje Cantz; Institute of Contemporary Art (Boston, Mass.), 2011.
- Negar, Azimi. "Paul Chan On Despotism, Democracy and the Fetish." Bidoun, November 1, 2006, 86–89.
- Obrist, Hans-Ulrich. "It's worth Trying to Imagine a New Visual Language to Describe the World We Live in Now." ARTit, August 1, 2007, 54–61.
- Obrist, Hans-Ulrich. Interviews. Volume 2. Milan: Charta Art, 2010.
- Paul, Schmelzer. "Over-Booked: Paul Chan on Badlands Unlimited." Walker Art Center - Blogs - The Gradient. September 7, 2012. http://blogs.walkerart.org/design/2012/09/07/over-booked-paul-chan-on-badlands-unlimited/.
- Rottmann, André. "Family of Strangers." Texte Zur Kunst, September 1, 2007, 153–59.
- Schmelzer, Paul. "What Can Saddam Teach Us About Democracy?" Walker. September 5, 2012. http://www.walkerart.org/magazine/2012/paul-chan-saddam-hussein-democracy.
- Sciortino, Natalie. "Inside Out." ARTVOICES, March 1, 2008, 8–9.
- Segal, Emily. "Biggie Smalls — Theodor Adorno." 032c, January 1, 2012.
- Zita, Carmen. "Art Eternal." Trace, March 1, 2005, 50–51.
- Van Der Poel, Daniël. "Paul Chan on Badlands Unlimited." Metropolis M, November 1, 2012.
