= George Baker (art historian) =

American art historian of modern and contemporary art

George Thomas Baker
- Born: April 25, 1970 (age 56); United States
- Education: Yale University (BA), Columbia University (PhD), Whitney Independent Study Program
- Occupations: Art critic, art historian, professor
- Employer(s): University of California, Los Angeles
- Known for: Writings on photography, Dada, Francis Picabia
- Notable work: The Artwork Caught by the Tail, Lateness and Longing

George Thomas Baker (born April 25, 1970) is an American art critic and historian of modern and contemporary art. He is especially known for his writings on photography. He is a professor of art history at the University of California, Los Angeles and an editor of the journal October. Reviewing a book that Baker wrote on Dada, Merlin James wrote "What Baker really offers, perfectly reasonably, is high-end, post-modern theorising, with just a touch of unconventionality in honour of his subject’s way-outness."

== Biography ==
Baker studied art history at Yale University and received his Ph.D. from Columbia University, also studying at the Whitney Independent Study program in New York from 1994-95. While at Columbia his advisors were Rosalind E. Krauss and Benjamin H. D. Buchloh. He edited an October Book on James Coleman, published in 2003, and has published The Artwork Caught by the Tail: Francis Picabia and Dada in Paris in 2007. He is also a critic of contemporary art, a contributor to Artforum magazine, he has written essays on the work of artist Paul Chan amongst others. In 2008 he participated in the conference Canvases and Careers Today at the Städelschule in Frankfurt am Main, that was subsequently published as a book, delivering a paper called "Late Criticism".

In 2009, with his colleague Steven Nelson, Baker led an attempt to save the fine arts library on the UCLA campus, launching a Facebook page and an online petition.

== The Artwork Caught by the Tail: Francis Picabia and Dada in Paris ==
The Artwork Caught by the Tail: Francis Picabia and Dada in Paris under MIT Press is Baker's study of Francis Picabia. Baker attends to Picabia's productive innovation in the Paris Dada moment, showing that it was through form that Picabia remade modernism from the medium up. The book contains five chapters.

== Selected publications ==
Books

- Baker, George (2002). James Coleman: Drei Filmarbeiten. Kurt Schwitters Prize 2002. Sprengel Museum, Hannover.
- — (2003). Gerard Byrne: Books, Magazines, and Newspapers. Lukas & Sternberg Press.
- —, ed. (2003). James Coleman. OCTOBER Files. MIT Press.
- — (2007). The Artwork Caught by the Tail: Francis Picabia and Dada in Paris. MIT Press.
- —, ed. with Eric Banks (2014). Paul Chan: Selected Writings, 2000-2014. Schaulager and Badlands Unlimited.
- — (2018). Dive Bar Architect: On the Work of D.E. May. LAXART Books.
- — (2018). Розширене поле фотографії (Photography's Expanded Field). IST Publishing, Kharkiv, Ukraine.
- — (2023). Lateness and Longing: On the Afterlife of Photography. University of Chicago Press.
- — and Annie Rana, eds. (2025). Tacita Dean. OCTOBER Files. MIT Press.

Essays

- Baker, George (2005). "Photography's Expanded Field". October 114 (Fall): 120-140.
