= Transidioethnography =

Transidioethography is a transdisciplinary practice that engages in a multimedia study and exploration of one's own cultural milieu through experiential fieldwork.

== Definition ==
"Idio" is Greek from idios, one's own, personal, id·i·o·syn·crat·ic, adjective, pertaining to the nature of idiosyncrasy, or something peculiar to an individual. "Trans" is a prefix occurring in loanwords from Latin (transcend;transdisciplinary, transgressive); “transverse,” in trāns (adv. and preposition) across, beyond, through. Ethnography is the scientific description of the customs of peoples and cultures.

Transidioethnography is a neologism conceived in England 2012 to describe a transdisciplinary practice that fuses autoethnographic field work, ethnographic practice and multimedia arts. The prefix "trans" suggests liminality, a quality of 'in between-ness', valuing cultures 'in between' predominant cultures.

== Research ==
Notable contributions have been Wright and Schneider's book Contemporary Art and Anthropology and more recently Berg's Between Art and Anthropology: Contemporary Ethnographic Practice.

"Between Art and Anthropology provides new and challenging arguments for considering contemporary art and anthropology in terms of fieldwork practice. Artists and anthropologists share a set of common practices that raise similar ethical issues, which the authors explore in depth for the first time. The book presents a strong argument for encouraging artists and anthropologists to learn directly from each other's practices 'in the field'. It goes beyond the so-called 'ethnographic turn' of much contemporary art and the 'crisis of representation' in anthropology, in productively exploring the implications of the new anthropology of the senses, and ethical issues, for future art-anthropology collaborations..."

Hal Foster's essay "The Artist as Ethnographer" in The Return of the Real, compares the contemporary Artist-Ethnographer with Walter Benjamins "Author as Producer".

He notes that as the author is bound to her patron, so, often is the artist bound to her sponsor, who may re-code the work as public engagement or even 'self-critique', inoculating it from critique from outside the institution. Despite these valid points, Foster admits that the collaboration between artists and communities have often resulted in illuminating results, such as recovering suppressed histories.

The concept of Autoethnography, a self-taught, or folk ethnography of one's own culture is discussed in Danahay's book Auto-Ethnography can be seen as a more reflexive, subjective recording of first-hand experience, surmounting the traditional observer-observed relationship in traditional Ethnography.
