= Badlands Unlimited =

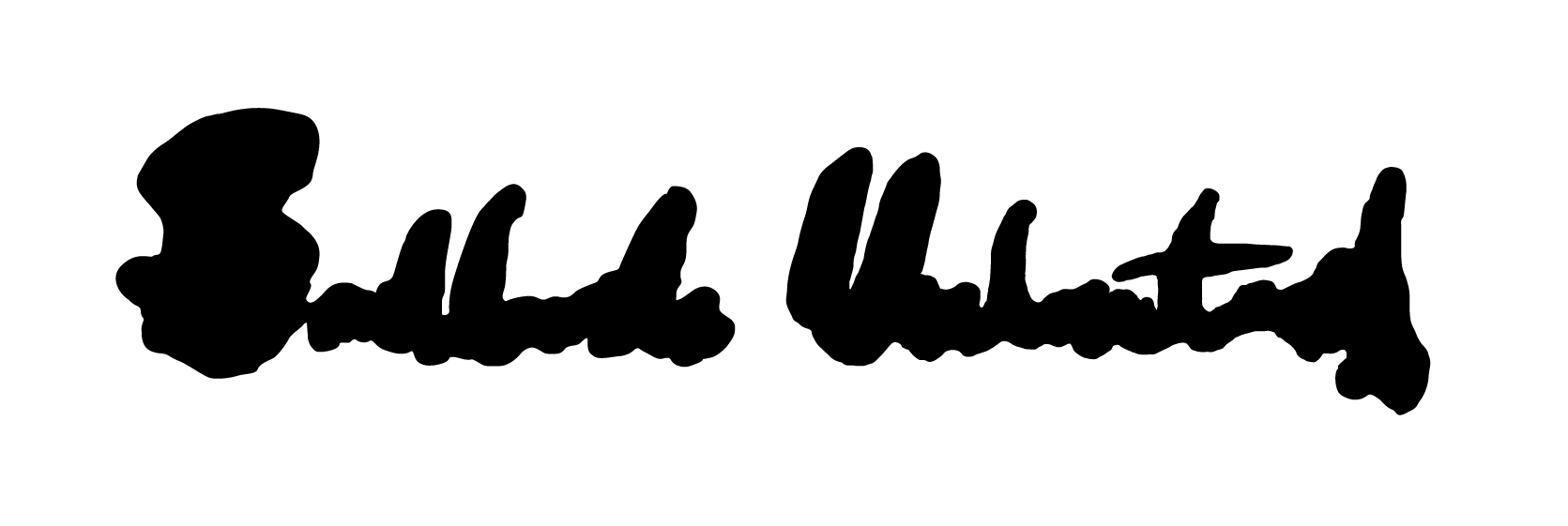
- Founded: 2010
- Founder: Paul Chan
- Country of origin: United States
- Headquarters location: New York City
- Distribution: Distributed Art Publishers
- Publication types: Books, Ebooks
- Official website: www.badlandsunlimited.com

Badlands Unlimited was a New York-based independent publisher founded by the artist Paul Chan in 2010. The press published texts by and with other artists in the form of paperbacks, ebooks, digital group exhibitions, a stone book, and other various media. The press also consulted on projects related to digital publishing for art institutions. As of late 2019, Badlands Unlimited has "closed for good". Badlands books have been featured and reviewed in the New York Times, New York Review of Books, Bookforum, Publishers Weekly, and Vogue, among many other publications.

== History ==
Paul Chan founded Badlands Unlimited in 2010 with the goal of "creating books in an expanded field." The company's flagship publications, The Essential and Incomplete Sade for Sade's Sake and Phaedrus Pron were authored by Chan himself and released as both paperback and e-books. Badlands consisted of fellow artists Ian Cheng, Micaela Durand, Matthew So, Parker Bruce, and Ambika Subra. With the publication of a book of poetry by choreographer and filmmaker Yvonne Rainer, Badlands began its secondary mission of publishing "things no one knew existed."

Badlands continued its departure from traditional paperback books with Mans in the Mirror (2011), a project that Badlands describes as a "first of its kind" 3D e-book. The staff of Badlands authored Mirror over the course of a single day while under the influence of mescaline. Existing solely in e-book format, publication would reinforce Badlands’ emphasis on digital publishing.

In 2012 Badlands published How to Download A Boyfriend, the "first-ever group show in the form of an e-book for the iPad." The show featured contributions from over 50 different artists and included interactive multiple-choice questions for the reader.

Later in 2012 Badlands Unlimited became the NY Art Book Fair's first primarily digital publisher. The press premiered Paul Chan's short story Holiday as both a digital e-book and on a sandstone tablet with its own ISBN.

Badlands further diversified the content of its publications with the release of AD BOOK by the art collective BFFA3AE in 2013. AD BOOK is a book consisting solely of advertisements by artists and institutions.

In keeping with its secondary mission to publish work revealing heretofore unknown sides of public figures, Badlands published a collection of essays On Democracy by Saddam Hussein (2012), 22 years' worth of never before collected diagrams and notes by curator and Serpentine Gallery co-director Hans Ulrich Obrist in Think Like Clouds (2014), and never before published 1964 interviews with Marcel Duchamp by Calvin Tomkins in Marcel Duchamp: The Afternoon Interviews (2013). Badlands’ most recent publication adhering to this pursuit is The Best Most Useless Dress (2014) by poet and New York Times critic Claudia La Rocco.

== Selected books and publications ==
- 2020. Word Book. Ludwig Wittgenstein and Désirée Weber. Trans. Bettina Funke, Catherine Schelbert, and Nickolas Calabrese. Hardcover.
- 2019. Odysseus and The Bathers. Paul Chan. Hardcover. OCLC 1071757034
- 2018. Whitewalling: Art, Race & Protest in 3 Acts. Aruna D'Souza. Paperback. OCLC 1026350400
- 2018. Craig Owens: Portrait of a Young Critic. Craig Owens, Lyn Blumnenthal, Kate Horsfield, and Lynne Tillman. Paperback. OCLC 1026415570
- 2017. Into Words: The Selected Writings of Carroll Dunham. Carroll Dunham. Paperback. OCLC 1002858564
- 2016. New Lovers 9: Fantasian. Larissa Pham. Paperback. OCLC 947795170
- 2016. New Lovers 8: One Valencia Lane. Bettina Davis. Paperback. OCLC 1075109778
- 2016. New Lovers 7: Kuntalini. Tamara Faith Berger. Paperback. OCLC 933720344
- 2015. New Lovers 6: Burning Blue. Cara Benedetto. Paperback. OCLC 910702343
- 2015. New Lovers 5: I Would Do Anything For Love. Al Bedell. Paperback. OCLC 910702346
- 2015. New Lovers 4: My Wet Hot Drone Summer. Lex Brown. Paperback. OCLC 910702345
- 2015. New Lovers 3: God, I Don't Even Know Your Name. Andrea McGinty. Paperback. OCLC 1066368515
- 2015. New Lovers 2: We Love Lucy. Lilith Wes. Paperback. OCLC 898531037
- 2015. New Lovers 1: How to Train Your Virgin. Wednesday Black. Paperback. OCLC 898530715
- 2015. Hippias Minor or The Art Of Cunning: A New Translation. Plato, Paul Chan, and Richard Fletcher. Trans. Sarah Ruden. Paperback. OCLC 915340164
- 2014. New New Testament. Paul Chan. Hardcover. OCLC 881425297
- 2014. The Best Most Useless Dress. Claudia La Rocco. Paperback, e-book. OCLC 880566898
- 2014. Think Like Clouds. Hans Ulrich Obrist. Paperback, e-book. OCLC 875462739
- 2014. Paul Chan: Selected Writings 2000–2014. Chan, Paul, George Baker, Eric Banks, Isabel Friedli, and Martina Venanzoni. Paperback, e-book. OCLC 867604442
- 2013. AD BOOK. BFFA3AE. E-book.
- 2013. Marcel Duchamp: The Afternoon Interviews Calvin Tomkins. Paperback, e-book. OCLC 822894777
- 2013. Fires of Siberia. Tréy Sager. E-book.
- 2012. On Democracy. Hussein, Saddam, Paul Chan, Jeff Severns Guntzel, Negar Azimi, and Nickolas Calabrese. Paperback, e-book. OCLC 794365121
- 2012. HELL_TREE. Petra Cortright. E-book.
- 2012. How to Download a Boyfriend. E-book.
- 2011. What is? A series of unique hand-made zines, e-book series.
- 2011. Mans in the Mirrors (in 3D). 3-D e-book.
- 2011. Poems. poems by Yvonne Rainer. Print, e-book. OCLC 767726964
- 2010. Phaedrus Pron. Paul Chan. Paperback. OCLC 731515213
- 2010. The Essential and Incomplete Sade for Sade's Sake. Paul Chan. Paperback. OCLC 722961020

== Notable authors ==
- Etel Adnan
- Cory Arcangel
- Gregg Bordowitz
- Bernadette Corporation
- Paul Chan
- Petra Cortright
- Aruna D’Souza
- Marcel Duchamp
- Carroll Dunham
- Hans Ulrich Obrist
- Craig Owens
- Dread Scott
- Cauleen Smith
- Martine Syms
- Yvonne Rainer
- Claudia La Rocco
- Rachel Rose
- Trey Sager
- Lynne Tillman
- Calvin Tomkins

== Controversy ==
Badlands Unlimited's participation in the 2010 NY Art Book Fair as the event's first publisher primarily focused on e-book publication ignited debate over whether the rise of e-books would mean the destruction of traditional paperback publications.

Apple temporarily removed How to Download a Boyfriend from its e-book store citing concerns over nudity in the book. The item has since been made available for purchase again.
