= Joan Copjec =

American philosopher (born 1946)

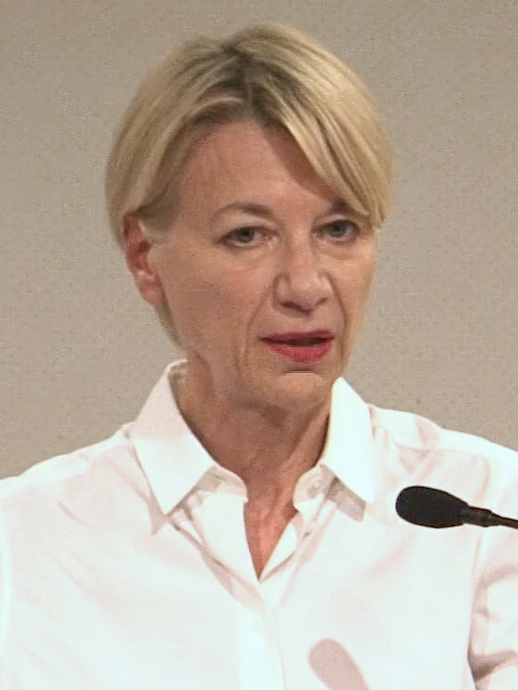
- Born: Joan Karen Copjec; 1946 (age 79–80); Hartford, Connecticut, U.S.

Academic background
- Education: Wheaton College; UW–Madison; Slade School of Fine Art; New York University (PhD)
- Thesis: Apparatus and Umbra: A Feminist Critique of Film Theory (1986)
- Doctoral advisor: Annette Michelson

Joan Karen Copjec (born 1946) is an American philosopher, theorist, author, feminist, and prominent Lacanian psychoanalytic theorist. She is Professor of Modern Culture & Media at Brown University.

== Early life and career ==
Joan K. Copjec was born in Hartford, Connecticut in 1946; her family is of Czech ancestry. She received her bachelor's degree in English literature, with a minor in Classics, in 1968 from Wheaton College. She received her master's degree in English in 1969 from the University of Wisconsin–Madison and began her doctoral work there, with a minor in Film in 1972. Abandoning her original Ph.D. dissertation project, she continued pursuing her film interests from 1972–74 at the Orson Welles Film School, an operation of the Orson Welles Cinema, in Cambridge, Massachusetts. In 1978, she received a two-year graduate diploma from the Film Unit of the Slade School of Fine Arts at University College, London. In 1986, she completed her Ph.D. in Cinema Studies at New York University.

Prior to beginning her position at Brown University in 2013, she was a visiting associate professor in English, an associated professor in Cinema and Media Studies, and a Distinguished Professor in Cinema and Media Studies, all at the State University of New York University at Buffalo, from 1989 to 2013. From 1991 to 2013, she also served as the Director of the Center for Study of Psychoanalysis and Culture, also at Buffalo. She has served as editor or co-editor for several academic journals and book series, including October (1981–1992) and Umbr(a), which she co-founded.

Copjec has been a strong proponent of the power of psychoanalytic theory, especially as articulated by Jacques Lacan and in reference to film study, as she noted in a set of email interviews in 2014, just before her move to Brown University:

I find that from my background in psychoanalysis with its singular arsenal of concepts – the unconscious, drive, fantasy, jouissance, repression, disavowal, foreclosure, and so on – I ask different kinds of questions, look for different sets of details or notice their absence than someone without a Freudian/Lacanian perspective. To give an old but canonical example: we used to point out that with the introduction of psychoanalysis into film theory the axis of investigation was shifted away from a focus on the narrative to the axis of the spectator-screen relation; the question became: How is the spectator "sutured" into the film? A shift of this order, of this magnitude is always at work when one approaches an object from the perspective of psychoanalysis.

In that same set of interviews, she marks her psychoanalytic position as distinct from the premises of what she considers "gender theory":

Much of my current work is focused on salvaging sex and sexual difference (as they are understood by Freudian/Lacanian psychoanalysis) from the threat of extinction. This has lead [sic] me to try to rearticulate a robust notion of "group psychology" or "community" and to oppose what is called "gender theory," a phenomenon that emerged in the 80s not only in the West but also in the Islamic world and that sets as its goal the elimination of sexual difference.

That position was reaffirmed in another interview in 2020:

Identity politics is as much, or more, of an anathema to psychoanalysis as it was to Foucault. The subject is not identical to itself and all attempts to think of the subject, or a group, or the human, as self-identical leads inevitably to establishing a boundary on the other side of which are those we do not like because they are not like us. The establishing of strong boundaries is what ego psychology recommends; it is also the protective gesture of identity politics. Establishing a politics on the basis of identity is not only reckless politically, it is also theoretically unfounded: identity is a fiction.

== Selected bibliography ==
- Imagine There's No Woman: Ethics and Sublimation (MIT Press, 2002)
- Read My Desire: Lacan against the Historicists (MIT Press, 1994)
- Supposing the Subject (Verso, 1994)
