= Hal Foster (art critic) =

American art critic and historian

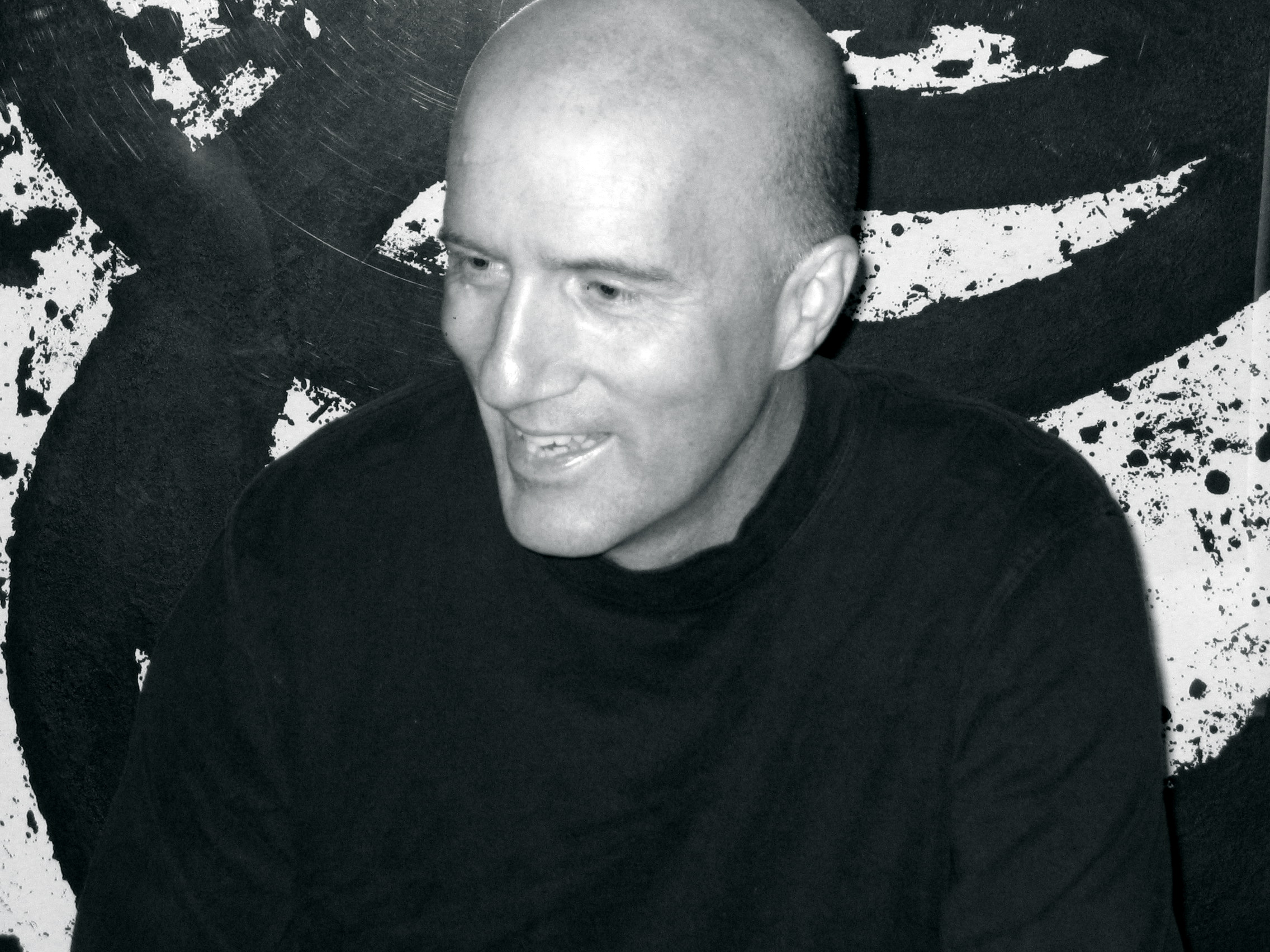
- Foster in 2004
- Born: August 13, 1955 (age 71); Seattle, Washington, U.S.
- Awards: Guggenheim Fellowship (1998)

Academic background
- Education: Princeton University (A.B.); Columbia University (M.A.); City University of New York (Ph.D.)
- Doctoral advisor: Rosalind Krauss

Academic work
- Discipline: Art history
- Institutions: Princeton University; Cornell University

Harold Foss "Hal" Foster (born August 13, 1955) is an American art critic and historian. He was educated at Princeton University, Columbia University, and the City University of New York. He taught at Cornell University from 1991 to 1997 and has been on the faculty at Princeton since 1997. In 1998 he received a Guggenheim Fellowship.

Foster's criticism focuses on the role of the avant-garde within postmodernism. In 1983, he edited The Anti-Aesthetic: Essays on Postmodern Culture, a groundbreaking text in postmodernism. In Recodings (1985), he promotes a vision of postmodernism that simultaneously engages its avant-garde history and comments on contemporary society. In The Return of the Real (1996), he proposes a model of historical recurrence of the avant-garde in which each cycle improves upon the inevitable failures of previous cycles. He views his roles as critic and historian of art as complementary rather than mutually opposed.

== Early life and education ==
Foster was born on August 13, 1955, in Seattle, Washington. His father was a partner in the law firm of Foster, Pepper & Shefelman. He attended Lakeside School in Seattle, where Microsoft founder Bill Gates was a classmate.

He graduated with an A.B. in English from Princeton University in 1977 with a senior thesis examining the English poets Ted Hughes and Geoffrey Hill. In 1979 he completed a Master of Arts in English at Columbia University and a PhD in art history at the City University of New York in 1990, with a dissertation on Surrealism supervised by Rosalind E. Krauss.

== Career ==
After graduating from Princeton, Foster moved to New York City, where he worked for Artforum from 1977 to 1981. He was then an editor at Art in America until 1987, when he became Director of Critical and Curatorial Studies at the Whitney Museum Independent Study Program.

In 1982, a friend from Lakeside School founded Bay Press to publish The Mink's Cry, a children's book written by Foster. In the following year Bay Press published The Anti-Aesthetic: Essays on Postmodern Culture, a collection of essays on postmodernism edited by Foster that became a pivotal text of postmodernism. In 1985, Bay Press published Recodings, Foster's first collection of essays. The Anti-Aesthetic and Recodings were, respectively, Bay Press's best and second-best selling titles. Foster founded Zone magazine in 1985 and was its editor until 1992.

In 1991, Foster left the Whitney to join the faculty of Cornell University's Department of the History of Art. That same year, Foster became an editor of the journal October; he is still on the board as of 2026. In 1997 he joined the Princeton faculty in the Department of Art and Archaeology. In 2000 he became the Townsend Martin Professor of Art and Archaeology. He chaired the Department of Art and Archaeology from 2005 to 2009. He was a faculty fellow of Wilson College.

Foster received a Guggenheim Fellowship in 1998. In 2010 he was elected a fellow of the American Academy of Arts and Sciences and awarded the Clark Prize for Excellence in Arts Writing by the Clark Art Institute. In the spring of 2011 he won a Berlin Prize fellowship from the American Academy in Berlin.

== Criticism ==
Foster interviewing Robert Longo in 2017

In his introduction to The Anti-Aesthetic (1983), Foster describes a distinction between complicity with and resistance to capitalism within postmodernism. The book includes contributions by Jean Baudrillard, Douglas Crimp, Kenneth Frampton, Jürgen Habermas, Fredric Jameson, Rosalind E. Krauss, Craig Owens, Edward Said, and Gregory Ulmer.

In Recodings (1985), Foster focuses on the role of the avant-garde within postmodernism. He advocates for a postmodernism that engages in both a continuation of its historical roots in the avant-garde and in a contemporary social and political critique, in opposition to what he sees as a "pluralistic" impulse to abandon the avant-garde in favor of more aesthetically traditional and commercially viable modes. He promotes artists he sees as exemplifying this vision, among them Dara Birnbaum, Jenny Holzer, Barbara Kruger, Louise Lawler, Sherrie Levine, Allan McCollum, Martha Rosler, and Krzysztof Wodiczko. Foster favors the expansion of the scope of postmodernist art from galleries and museums to a broader class of public locations and from painting and sculpture to other media. He sees postmodernism's acknowledgment of differences in viewers' backgrounds and lack of deference to expertise as important contributions to the avant-garde.

By the mid-1990s, Foster had come to believe that the dialectic within the avant-garde between historical engagement and contemporary critique had broken down. In his view, the latter came to be preferred over the former as interest was elevated over quality. In The Return of the Real (1996), taking as his model Karl Marx's reaction against G. W. F. Hegel, he seeks to rebut Peter Bürger's assertion—made in Theory of the Avant-Garde (1974)—that the neo-avant-garde largely represented a repetition of the projects and achievements of the historical avant-garde, and therefore was a failure. Foster's model is based on a notion of "deferred action" inspired by the work of Sigmund Freud. He concedes the failure of the initial avant-garde wave but argues that future waves can redeem earlier ones by incorporating through historical reference those aspects that were not comprehended the first time. Gordon Hughes compares this theory with Jean-François Lyotard's.

Foster has been critical of the field of visual culture. In a 1999 article in Social Text, Douglas Crimp rebutted Foster, criticizing his notion of the avant-garde and his treatment in The Return of the Real of sexual identity in Andy Warhol's work. This criticality of Foster's spreads to both the practice and the field of design in his book Design and Crime (2002).

Foster views his roles as art critic and art historian as complementary rather than mutually opposed, in accordance with his adherence to postmodernism. In an interview published in the Journal of Visual Culture, he said: "I've never seen critical work in opposition to historical work: like many others I try to hold the two in tandem, in tension. History without critique is inert; criticism without history is aimless".

== Selected works ==
- The Mink's Cry, 1982. Bay Press.
- The Anti-Aesthetic: Essays on Postmodern Culture, 1983. Editor. Bay Press.
- Recodings: Art, Spectacle, Cultural Politics, 1985. Bay Press.
- Vision and Visuality, 1988. Editor. The New Press.
- Discussions in Contemporary Culture, 1988. Editor. The New Press.
- Compulsive Beauty, 1995. MIT Press.
- The Return of the Real: The Avant-Garde at the End of the Century, 1996. MIT Press.
- Design and Crime (And Other Diatribes), 2002. Verso Books.
  - 2nd edition, 2011.
- Art Since 1900: Modernism, Anti-Modernism, Postmodernism, 2005. With Rosalind E. Krauss, Yve-Alain Bois, and Benjamin Buchloh. Thames & Hudson.
- Pop (Themes & Movements), 2006. With Mark Francis. Phaidon Press.
- Prosthetic Gods, 2006. MIT Press.
- The Art-Architecture Complex, 2011. Verso Books.
- The First Pop Age: Painting and Subjectivity in the Art of Hamilton, Lichtenstein, Warhol, Richter, and Ruscha, 2011. Princeton University Press.
- Bad New Days: Art, Criticism, Emergency, 2015. Verso Books.
- What Comes after Farce? Art and Criticism at a Time of Debacle, 2020. Verso Books.
- Brutal Aesthetics, 2020. Princeton University Press.
- Fail Better: Reckonings with Artists and Critics, 2025. MIT Press.
