= Rosalind E. Krauss =

American art critic

Rosalind Krauss
- Born: Rosalind Epstein; November 30, 1941 (age 84); Washington, D.C., U.S.
- Education: Wellesley College; Harvard University
- Occupations: Art historian, professor, art critic
- Employer: Columbia University

Rosalind Krauss (née Epstein; born November 30, 1940) is an American art critic, art theorist and a professor at Columbia University in New York City. Krauss is known for her scholarship in 20th-century painting, sculpture and photography. As a critic and theorist she has published regularly since 1966 in Artforum, Art International and Art in America. She was associate editor of Artforum from the late 1960s to the early 1970s and has been editor of October, a journal of contemporary arts criticism and theory, since she co-founded it in 1976.

In 2025, she was awarded the Balzan Prize for her scholarly achievements and her role in the establishment of contemporary art as a field of research.

== Early life ==
Krauss was born to Jewish parents, Matthew M. Epstein and Bertha Luber, in Washington, D.C., and grew up in the area, visiting art museums with her father.

After graduating from Wellesley College in 1962, she attended Harvard University as a graduate student. Krauss wrote her dissertation on the work of David Smith. Krauss received her Ph.D. in 1969. The dissertation was published as Terminal Iron Works in 1971.

== Career ==
In the mid-1960s, Krauss began to contribute articles to art journals such as Art International and Artforum. She began by writing the "Boston Letter" for Art International, but soon published well-received articles on Jasper Johns (Lugano Review, 1965) and Donald Judd (Artforum, May 1966). Her commitment to the emerging minimalist movement set her apart from Michael Fried, who was oriented toward the continuation of modernist abstraction in Jules Olitski, Kenneth Noland and Anthony Caro. Krauss's article "A View of Modernism" (Artforum, September 1972), was one signal of this break.

=== Founding October ===
Krauss became dissatisfied with Artforum when in its November 1974 issue it published a full-page advertisement featuring artist Lynda Benglis posed with a large latex dildo and wearing only a pair of sunglasses, promoting an upcoming exhibition of hers at the Paula Cooper Gallery. Krauss and other Artforum personnel attacked Benglis' work in the following month's issue, describing the advertisement as exploitative and brutalizing, and left the magazine to co-found October in 1976.

October was formed as a politically-charged journal that introduced American readers to the ideas of French post-structuralism. Krauss used October as a way of publishing essays on post-structuralist art theory, psychoanalysis, postmodernism and feminism.

The founders included Krauss, Annette Michelson and Jeremy Gilbert-Rolfe. Jeremy Gilbert-Rolfe withdrew after only a few issues, and by 1977, Douglas Crimp joined the editorial team. In 1990, Crimp left the journal. Krauss and Michelson were joined by Yve-Alain Bois, Hal Foster, Benjamin Buchloh, Denis Hollier and John Rajchman in the early 1990s.

=== Teaching ===
Krauss taught at Wellesley, MIT and Princeton before joining the faculty at Hunter College in 1975. She was promoted to professor in the late 1970s at Hunter and was also appointed professor at the CUNY Graduate Center. She held the title of distinguished professor at Hunter until she left to join the Columbia University faculty in 1992.

Originally Meyer Schapiro Professor of Modern Art and Theory at Columbia, in 2005 Krauss was promoted to the highest faculty rank of university professor.

=== Curator ===
Krauss has been curator of many art exhibitions, among including shows on Joan Miró at the Solomon R. Guggenheim Museum(with Margit Rowell, 1970–1973), on surrealism and photography at the Corcoran Gallery of Art (with Jane Livingston, 1982–1985), on Richard Serra at the Museum of Modern Art (with Laura Rosenstock, 1985–1986) and on Robert Morris at the Solomon R. Guggenheim Museum (with Thomas Krens, 1992–1994). She prepared an exhibition for the Centre Pompidou in Paris called "L'Informe: Mode d'Emploi" with Yve-Alain Bois in 1996.

=== Other work ===
In 1985, a collection of her essays titled The Originality of the Avant-Garde and Other Modernist Myths was published by MIT Press. She has received fellowships from the Guggenheim Fellowship, the National Endowment for the Arts, the Center for Advanced Study in the Visual Arts and the Institute for Advanced Study. She received the Frank Jewett Mather Award from the College Art Association in 1973. She has been a fellow of the New York Institute for the Humanities since 1992, was elected a member of the American Academy of Arts and Sciences in 1994 and became a member of the American Philosophical Society in 2012. She received an honorary doctorate from Harvard University in 2011.

== Critical approach ==
=== Greenbergian tradition ===
Krauss attempts to understand the phenomenon of modernist art in its historical, theoretical and formal dimensions. She has been interested in the development of photography, whose history—running parallel to that of modernist painting and sculpture—makes visible certain previously overlooked phenomena in the "high arts", such as the role of the indexical mark, or the function of the archive. She has also investigated the concepts of formlessness, the optical unconscious and pastiche, which organize modernist practice in relation to different explanatory grids from those of progressive modernism, or the avant-garde.

Krauss had been drawn to the criticism of Clement Greenberg, as a counterweight to the subjective, poetic approach of Harold Rosenberg. For Krauss, the basis of the poet-critic model in subjective expression is unable to account for how a particular artwork's objective structure gives rise to its associated subjective effects.

Greenberg's way of assessing how an art object works, or how it is put together, became for Krauss a fruitful resource; although she and Michael Fried broke first with Greenberg, and then with each other, the commitment to formal analysis as the necessary if not sufficient ground of serious criticism still remained for both of them. Decades after her first engagement with Greenberg, Krauss still used his ideas about an artwork's medium as a jumping-off point for her effort to come to terms with post-1980 art through William Kentridge. Krauss formulates this formalist commitment in strong terms, against attempts to account for powerful artworks in terms of residual ideas about an artist's individual genius, for instance in the essays "The Originality of the Avant-Garde: A Postmodernist Repetition" and "Photography's Discursive Spaces." For Krauss, and for the school of critics who developed under her influence, the Greenbergian legacy offers at its best a way of accounting for works of art using public and verifiable criteria.

=== Translating ephemeralities into prose ===
Krauss is known for translating the ephemeralities of visual and bodily experience into precise, vivid prose, which has solidified her prestige as a critic. Her usual practice is to make this experience intelligible by using categories translated from the work of a thinker outside the study of art, such as Maurice Merleau-Ponty, Ferdinand de Saussure, Jacques Lacan, Jean-François Lyotard, Jacques Derrida, Georges Bataille or Roland Barthes. She participated in the translation of Lacan's Television, which was published in October and later reissued in book form by W. W. Norton. Krauss has been credited as a leader in bringing these concepts to bear on the study of modern art. Her work helped establish the position of these writers within the study of art, even at the cost of provoking anxiety about threats to the discipline's autonomy. For instance, her Passages in Modern Sculpture (1977) makes use of Merleau-Ponty's phenomenology for viewing modern sculpture. In her study of Surrealist photography, she rejected William Rubin's efforts at formal categorization as insufficient, instead advocating for the psychoanalytic categories of "dream" and "automatism", as well as Jacques Derrida's "grammatological" idea of "spacing."

=== On Picasso, Freud and Pollock ===
Concerning Cubist art, she took Pablo Picasso's collage breakthrough to be explicable in terms of Saussure's ideas about the differential relations and non-referentiality of language, rejecting efforts by other scholars to tie the pasted newspaper clippings to social history. Similarly, she held Picasso's stylistic developments in Cubist portraiture to be products of theoretical problems internal to art, rather than outcomes of the artist's love life. Later, she explained Picasso's participation in the return to order of the 1920s in similar structuralist terms.

From the 1980s, she became increasingly concerned with using a psychoanalytic understanding of drives and the unconscious, owing to Lacan and Bataille.

Krauss returned to the drip painting of Jackson Pollock as both a culmination of modernist work within the format of the "easel picture", and as a breakthrough that opened the way for several important developments in later art. This direction provided intellectual validation for the explosive Pollock markets, but exacerbated already tense relations between herself and more radical currents in visual/cultural studies, the latter growing steadily impatient with the traditional western art-historical canon.

In addition to writing focused studies about individual artists, Krauss also produced broader, synthetic studies that helped gather together and define the limits of particular fields of practice. Examples of this include "Sense and Sensibility: Reflections on Post '60s Sculpture" (Artforum, Nov. 1973), "Video: The Aesthetics of Narcissism" (October, spring 1976), "Notes on the Index: Seventies Art in America", in two parts, October spring and fall 1977), "Grids, You Say", In Grids: Format and Image in 20th Century Art (exh. cat.: Pace Gallery, 1978) and "Sculpture in the Expanded Field" (October, spring 1979). Some of these essays are collected in her book The Originality of the Avant-Garde and Other Modernist Myths.

== Selected publications ==
=== Books ===
- Terminal Iron Works: The Sculpture of David Smith. Cambridge, Massachusetts: MIT Press, 1971.
- The Sculpture of David Smith: A Catalogue Raisonné. Garland Reference Library of the Humanities, 73. New York: Garland Publishing, 1977.
- Passages in Modern Sculpture. Cambridge, Massachusetts: MIT Press, 1977.
- The Originality of the Avant-Garde and Other Modernist Myths. Cambridge, Massachusetts: MIT Press, 1985.
- L'Amour Fou: Photography & Surrealism. London: Arts Council England, 1986.
- Le Photographique: Pour une théorie des écarts. Translated by Marc Bloch and Jean Kempf. Paris: Macula, 1990.
- The Optical Unconscious. Cambridge, Massachusetts: MIT Press, 1993.
- Formless: A User's Guide (with Yve-Alain Bois). Zone Books, 1997.
- The Picasso Papers. Cambridge, Massachusetts: MIT Press, 1999.
- Bachelors. Cambridge, Massachusetts: MIT Press, 1999.
- A Voyage on the North Sea: Art in the Age of the Post-Medium Condition. New York: Thames & Hudson, 2000.
- Perpetual Inventory. Cambridge, Massachusetts: MIT Press, 2010.
- Under Blue Cup. Cambridge, Massachusetts: MIT Press, 2011.
- Willem De Kooning Nonstop: Cherchez La Femme. University of Chicago Press, 2016.

=== Book reviews ===
- "Man in a Mold". Review of James Lord, Giacometti: A Biography. In The New Republic, December 16, 1985, pp. 24–29.
- "Post-History on Parade". Review of three books by Arthur Danto. In The New Republic, May 25, 1987, pp. 27–30.
- "Only Project". Review of Richard Wollheim, Painting as an Art. In The New Republic, September 1988, pp. 33–38.
