= Ann Burke Daly =

American artist

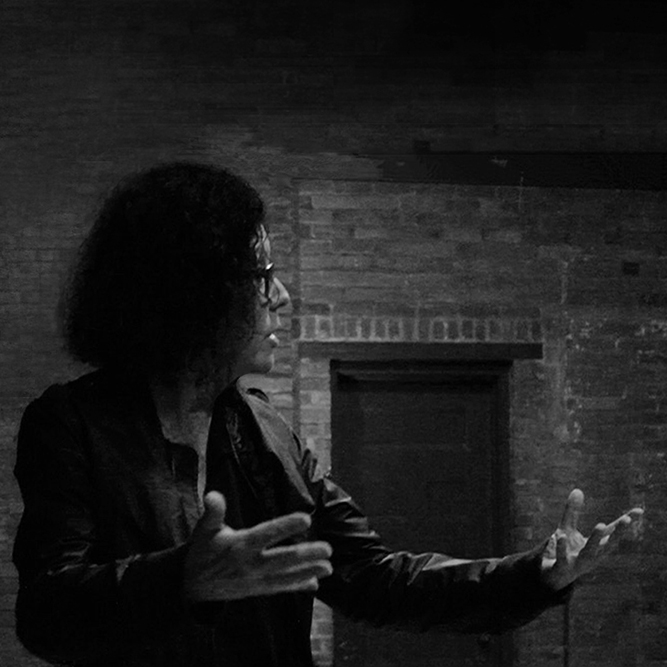
- Born: 1961 (age 64–65); US
- Education: Yale School of Art and Whitney Museum of American Art (ISP)
- Known for: Installation Art, Sound Art, Sculpture, Video, Photography

Ann Burke Daly (born 1961) is an American artist whose works include installation, performance, sculptures, photographs, video and sound projects, writings, and books. Much of her art deals with the afterlife of objects and events, as well as the repetitiveness of daily life, showing how memory and perceptions can be shaped.

She addresses the vagaries of memory and perception through using a task-based performance and the repetition of quotidian action to create collections of evidence.

Her work is conceptual time-based; it embraces the discontinuities and contradictions inherent in time and memory.

Daly's work has been exhibited internationally at institutions including Uppsala Konstmuseum in Sweden, the Centre Pompidou in Paris, Akademie der Kunste in Berlin, and the Los Angeles Municipal Art Gallery.

== Education and academic career ==
Daly received her MFA in painting from Yale School of Art (1988–1990) and is a post-graduate fellow of the Whitney Museum of American Art, Independent Study Program (1993–1994). She attended the Yale Norfolk Summer School of Art as an undergraduate (1987). After Daly graduated from Yale, she taught at Vassar College as a member of the Studio Art faculty (1990–1995) while studying at the Whitney Museum of American Art (ISP). Daly was a Visiting assistant professor at the City University of New York (2013–2015). In 2015, she was a Visiting Artist at the American Academy in Rome and was chosen for Creative Capital and Lower Manhattan Cultural Council's ASI.

== Artistic career ==
=== The Automaton Olympia's Cabinet of Curiosities series ===
After working at Vassar College, Daly started her art career by creating her best-known series, The Automaton Olympia's Cabinet of Curiosities (1996). This series is a video installation recording the index of decorations belonging to an automaton, a lifeless doll. It has had several reviews, including Gregory Volk's commentary in WorldArt Magazine (1996). Volk writes that the installation's title comes from a character from E.T.A. Hoffmann's The Sandman short story whose name is Olympia. And that the video examines the "impermanence of social roles and shifting identities, historicity, verity and fiction" by seeing through the automaton's eyes. In Decoration and Detection (1997) from the Performing Arts Journal by George Baker, Baker observes the scenes and speculates the Oedipal narrative within the room's decorations, leaving no details out. He states the decorative objects in the video are a "repetitive experience of the indexical inscription." A narrative with "no origin and no end, no denuding, no dénouement" reading it through a Lacanian perspective and the causality failure. In the same year as Baker's review, The Mourning After Exhibition Catalog (1997) includes an essay by Susette Min addressing two installations from the same series. The Automaton Olympia Throws Her Voice "projects fragments of decorative details and furnishings" in two rooms. The video hints at when the automaton throws her voice and what will occur afterward. The Collector's Dream consists of wax flowers surrounding a bed along a wall down to the floor. There seems to be audio recordings narrating the story of a woman named "D." The installation covers a sense of "claustrophobia and a wish to escape into the sublime" away from the flowery room. Still, in 1997, Baker wrote another review of the series focusing on one installation work, the Stereoscopic Vision, in his Narrative Urge article. The Stereoscopic Vision (1996) is an audio recording that allows one person to listen to Daly's voice while facing outlines of absent photographs traced against a wall. The recording had "differing durations, creating endless and contradictory permutations of potential descriptions," leaving interpretation to the listener. The following year, J.P. Nilsson reviewed the Narrative Urge Exhibition curated by Catsou Roberts in ArtPress Magazine (1998), which included a picture of Daly's Stereoscopic Vision installation.

=== Anti-monuments ===
In 2001, Daly went to France to create her Anti-Monuments, photographing wrapped statues in the gardens of the Versailles. In 2002, Cabinet Magazine included two statue photographs from Daly's Anti-Monuments (Versailles) and a short review. Cabinet Magazine says the photographs address the “psychological and social space of the garden and landscape architecture.” And "emphasizing disorientation, anxiety, and disarray," as shown in one of the photographs, a statue seems to rip out of its confines.

=== Script: Franco is Still Dead ===
Two Years later, after working at the City University of New York and becoming a visiting artist, Daly collaborated with Álvaro Marcos, a Spanish DIY scene musician and writer, to work on Script: Franco is Still Dead. It is a multi-channel video and sound installation covering the rise of modern Democracy in Spain, the past dictatorship, and the civil war. Months later, after the completion of the project, Matthew McCardwell interviewed Daly and Marcos to discuss their project. One of the questions McCardwell asks them is what viewers will see when going into the installation. Daly says there would be "four large projections, and four sources of sound, which will become immersive." Another question from McCardwell is how the project fits with the second wave of resolutions. The projections and sound help viewers understand Spain's past as Daly wants to bring light to "what is silenced and hidden in plain sight." And have people understand the “struggle to make sense” of inherited narratives, and spectral transmissions."

=== Half-Life (A Forensics of Plain Sight) ===
At the end of 2018, Daly started her new project, Half-Life (A Forensics of Plain Sight) (2022), which has hundreds of close-up photographs of old prison buildings in Spain. On September 3, 2019, Fran Serrato wrote Inch by Inch Against Oblivion, an article in El Pais newspaper to discuss Daly's progress. Serrato writes that the project's intention is "to make visible these buildings which served as centers of torture during the dictatorship." From 1939 to 1975, Francisco Franco dictated Spain right after the Spanish Civil War of 1936 to 1939. Franco had military police, the Military Police of the Regional Army, that would maintain public order by creating prisons that still stand these years. Daly photographs these buildings to raise awareness of their history and bring them out of the shadows. The photographs are "portraits of the scars of places with a silenced memory."

== Awards ==
- 1992, Art Matters Foundation Fellowship
- 2002, Kohler Arts- Industry award
- 2016, Puffin Foundation Arts Grants
- 2016 and 2017, Studios of Mass MoCA
- 2018, Artist Residency in Visual Arts from Yaddo
- 2023, Puffin Foundation Arts Grants
- 2024, New York State Council on the Arts Grant
