= Annette Michelson =

American art and film critic (1922–2018)

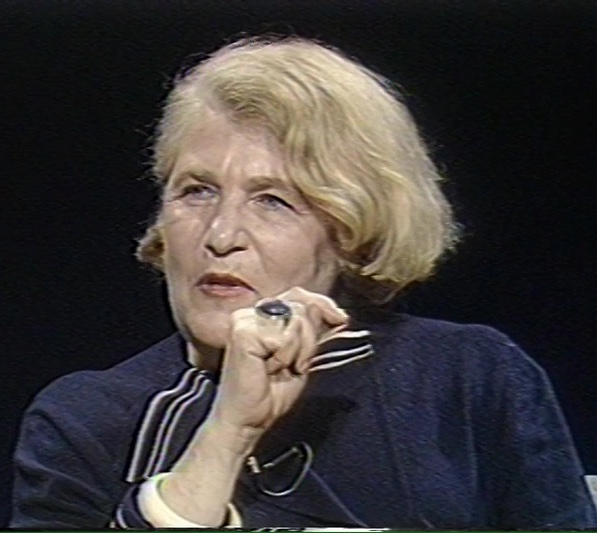
- Michelson discussing L'Age D'Or on CUNY TV's Cinema Then, Cinema Now (1986)
- Born: Annette Michelsohn; November 7, 1922; New York City, U.S.
- Died: September 17, 2018 (aged 95); New York City, U.S.
- Education: Brooklyn College; Columbia University; University of Paris
- Occupations: Critic; editor; academic
- Writing career
- Years active: 1956–2017

Annette Michelson (née Michelsohn; November 7, 1922 – September 17, 2018) was an American art and film critic and academic. A longtime contributor and editor to Artforum who later co-founded the journal October, she also taught for many years at the Tisch School of the Arts at New York University. Her work contributed to the fields of cinema studies and the avant-garde in visual culture.

== Background ==
Annette Michelsohn was born to a Jewish family in Manhattan on November 7, 1922. Her father, of Romanian descent, spoke Yiddish, and her mother, of Hungarian descent, spoke German. Her surname was anglicized to Michelson. She grew up in Brooklyn, where she took an interest in reading and the arts from a young age. She graduated from Hunter College High School circa 1940 and Brooklyn College in 1945. She undertook graduate studies at Columbia University, before moving to Paris in 1950. She initially planned to stay for only six months, but the emergence of McCarthyism in the United States made her reluctant to return, and she ultimately lived in France for over a decade. She enrolled at the University of Paris, studied acting for a time, and developed her interest in avant-garde film.

== Career ==
Between 1956 and 1966, she was art editor and critic for the Paris edition of the New York Herald Tribune, while also writing for Arts Magazine and Art International. She also worked as a translator. Upon returning to New York, she worked as a writer for Artforum, where she edited the influential issues on "Eisenstein/Brakhage" in 1973 and the "Special Film Issue" in 1973. Together with Jay Leyda, she established the Department of Cinema Studies at New York University, where she taught numerous courses, supervised doctoral dissertations, and developed programs until retiring in 2004.

Michelson left Artforum after an issue she was planning, dedicated to avant-garde art, was canceled due to a lack of advertiser interest. In response, she founded the journal October together with Rosalind Krauss. October was formed as a politically charged journal that introduced American readers to the ideas of French post-structuralism, made popular by Michel Foucault and Roland Barthes. Michelson's early essays for the journal included several on Sergei Eisenstein and Dziga Vertov, as well translations of texts by Georges Bataille. Krauss and Michelson remained on the journal's editorial board, along with Yve-Alain Bois, Hal Foster, Benjamin H. D. Buchloh, Denis Hollier, David Joselit, Carrie Lambert-Beatty, Mignon Nixon, and Malcolm Turvey.

In 1998, Michelson gave a historic lecture on Harry Everett Smith's film Heaven + Earth Magic (Film #12) at Massachusetts College of Art. In 2021 a recording of the presentation was discovered in the archives of Saul Levine and later digitized by Raymond Foye who made it publicly available on his YouTube channel.

Among her numerous translations, essays and articles, Michelson edited Kino-Eye: the Writings of Dziga Vertov (1984), and Cinema, Censorship, and the State: The Writings of Nagisa Oshima (1992).

On August 10, 2015, the Getty Research Institute announced that Michelson had donated her complete papers and archives to the Institute. The GRI also acquired the drawing Blind Time (1982) and a suite of lithographs, Earth Projects (1969), both by Robert Morris, from Michelson’s collection, as well as Michelson’s film library of over 1500 selections.

Michelson published a collection of her works on avant-garde and experimental film as On the Eve of the Future: Selected Writings on Film (MIT Press) in 2017. The volume includes the first critical essay on Marcel Duchamp's film Anemic Cinema, the first investigation into Joseph Cornell's filmic practices, and the first major exploration of work by Michael Snow. It also includes important essays on Maya Deren, Stan Brakhage, and Hollis Frampton.

== Personal life and death ==
Michelson, who lived in the SoHo neighborhood of Manhattan, died from dementia at her home on September 17, 2018, at the age of 95.
