= Craig Owens (critic) =

American post-modernist art critic (1950–1990)

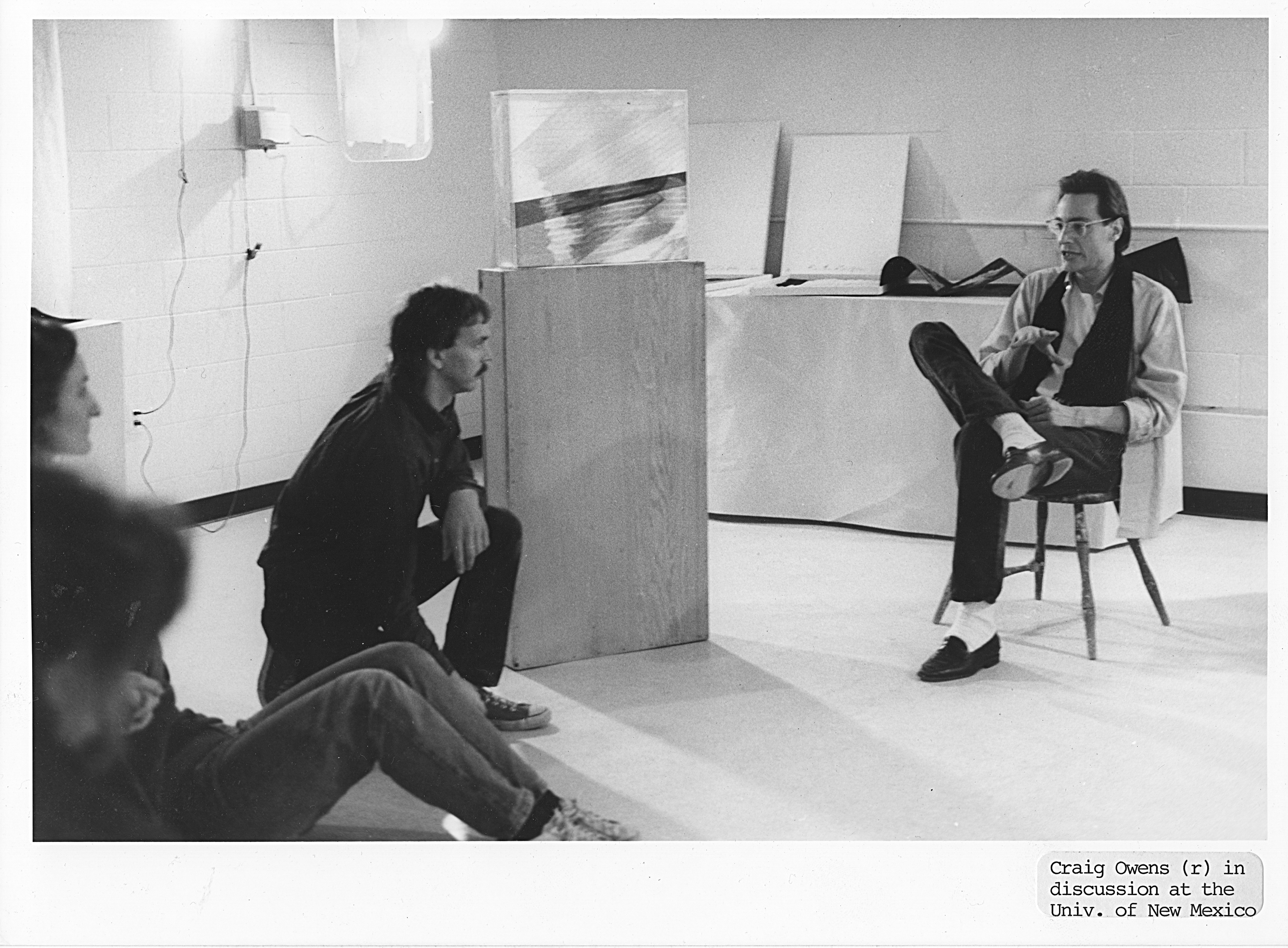
Owens (seated at right) in 1986

Craig Owens (1950–1990) was an American post-modernist art critic, gay activist and feminist.

== Biography ==
Craig Owens was a senior editor of Art in America, a contributor to such scholarly journals as Skyline and October, a graduate of Haverford College, and a professor of art history at Yale University and Barnard College. He wrote many essays on such diverse topics as photography, feminism, gay politics, art in the marketplace, serial art, and psychoanalysis, as well as a number of seminal essays on individual contemporary individual artists, including Allan McCollum, William Wegman, and Barbara Kruger. According to his colleague Douglas Crimp, Owens's great interest in ballet was important to his critical work. According to the critic Thomas Lawson, Owens was "on the one hand... this very high-minded, very abstract thinker, but he also had this mischievous, playful side that was a little cruel, maybe."

One of Owens's most influential essays was The Allegorical Impulse: Toward a Theory of Postmodernism, an article in two parts in which he explores the allegorical aspects of contemporary art. The two parts were published in the journal October in Spring 1980 and Summer 1980. In the first part Owens says that, "Allegorical imagery is appropriated imagery" (Owens, p54) and discerns an allegorical impulse at work in the appropriation art of artists such as Sherrie Levine. He describes the postmodernist artist as one that "lays claim to the culturally significant, poses as its interpreter... If he adds, however, he does so only to replace: the allegorical meaning supplants an antecedent one; it is supplement" (Owens, p54). These inclinations can be seen in works such as oil-barrels of Belgian artist Wim Delvoye and bullets of a gun by French artist Philippe Perrin. With reference to Walter Benjamin in The Origin of German Tragic Drama, he also links allegory with impermanence, the piling up of fragments and obsessional accumulation. These impulses can be seen, respectively, in site-specific art, photomontage and art that follows a mathematical progression (for instance Sol LeWitt). (Owens, p55-57). In the second part he considers the work of Laurie Anderson, Robert Rauschenberg and Cindy Sherman.

== Bibliography ==
=== Books ===
- Beyond Recognition – Representation. Power, and Culture, Scott Bryson, Barbara Kruger, Lynne Tillman, Jane Weinstock (eds.), Berkeley, Los Angeles & London: University California Press, 1992.

=== Selected articles ===
- "Earthwords" (1979).
- "The Allegorical Impulse: Toward a Theory of Postmodernism" (1980).
- "The Allegorical Impulse: Toward a Theory of Postmodernism (Part 2)" (1980).
- "Representation, Appropriation, and Power" (1982).
- "The Discourse of Others: Feminists and Postmodernism" (1983).
- "Outlaws: Gay Men in Feminism" (1987).
- "’The Indignity of Speaking for Others’: An Imaginary Interview" (1983).
- "Analysis Logical and Ideological" (1985).
- "From Work to Frame, or, Is There Life After ’The Death of the Author’?" (1987).
