= Phillip Brian Harper =

Literary scholar and cultural critic

- Occupations: Literary scholar; Cultural critic
- Title: Program Director for Higher Learning, Andrew W. Mellon Foundation

Phillip Brian Harper is a literary scholar and cultural critic. He currently serves as Program Director for Higher Learning at The Andrew W. Mellon Foundation, and was previously Dean for the Graduate School of Arts and Science at New York University. Harper is best known for his work in modern and contemporary literature, African American literature and culture, and gender and sexuality studies.

== Work ==
Harper's fields of study include modern and contemporary U.S. literary and cultural studies; African American literary, cultural, and fine art studies; aesthetics and social theory; and gender and sexuality studies.

His 1999 book, Private Affairs: Critical Ventures in the Culture of Social Relations, explores the social and cultural significance of the private, proposing that privacy is limited by one's racial-and sexual-minority status. Art critic Douglas Crimp wrote, "Private Affairs teaches us how thoroughly complex is the negotiation of privacy and publicity when we attend to gender and sexuality, race and class."

In 2015, Harper published Abstractionist Aesthetics: Artistic Form and Social Critique in African American Culture, a series of essays arguing for displacing realism as the primary mode of African American representational aesthetics. Rather, Harper argues, cultural producers should re-center literature as a principal site of African American cultural politics and elevate experimental prose within the domain of African American literature. The book explored the artistic practices of visual artists Fred Wilson and Kara Walker, the music of Billie Holiday and Cecil Taylor, and the writings of Ntozake Shange, Alice Walker, and John Keene. Professor Brent Hayes Edwards of Columbia University wrote,

"With fine-tuned readings, Abstractionist Aesthetics is a devastating critique of the all-too-common presumption that variants of realism are the only effective option for a black art that would respond to the history of racial deprivation."

At NYU, Harper was the Founding Chair of the Department of Social and Cultural Analysis (SCA). He also served as Director of Graduate Studies in American Studies, in English, and in SCA; as Director of the American Studies and Gender and Sexuality Programs; and as Chair of the Department of English.

== Bibliography ==
=== Books ===
- Abstractionist Aesthetics: Artistic Form and Social Critique in African American Culture. New York: NYU Press, 2015 ISBN 9781479818365
- Private Affairs: Critical Ventures in the Culture of Social Relations. New York: NYU Press, 1999 ISBN 9780814735947
- Queer Transexions of Race, Nation, and Gender. Durham: Duke Press, 1997 ISBN 9780822364528
- Are We Not Men? Masculine Anxiety and the Problem of African-American Identity. New York: Oxford UP, 1996 ISBN 9780195126549
- Framing the Margins: The Social Logic of Postmodern Culture. New York: Oxford UP, 1994 ISBN 9780195082395
