= Ian Cheng =

American artist

- Born: 1984 (age 41–42); Los Angeles, California, U.S.
- Education: BA, University of California, Berkeley; MFA, Columbia University
- Occupation: Artist
- Notable work: Emissaries Trilogy; BOB (Bag of Beliefs); Life After BOB
- Spouse: Rachel Rose
- Website: iancheng.com

Ian Cheng (born 1984) is an American contemporary artist known for his "virtual ecosystem" live-simulated digital artworks. His artworks explore the capacity of living agents to deal with change, and are "less about the wonders of new technologies than about the potential for these tools to realize ways of relating to a chaotic existence." His work has been widely exhibited internationally, including MoMA PS1, Serpentine Galleries, Whitney Museum of American Art, Hirshhorn Museum, Venice Biennale, Leeum Museum and other institutions.

== Early life and education ==
Cheng was born in Los Angeles, California in 1984. Cheng attended Van Nuys High School. Cheng graduated from University of California, Berkeley in 2006 with a dual degree in cognitive science and art practice. Cheng worked at Industrial Light & Magic, George Lucas's visual effects company. Cheng attended Columbia University School of the Arts, where he earned his MFA in 2009. Cheng worked in the studio of artist Pierre Huyghe from 2010 to 2012 and also worked as co-director at Paul Chan's independent New York based publishing company, Badlands Unlimited, founded in 2010.

== Work ==
Cheng popularized the use of simulation as a medium available to artistic practice, capable of composing together both man-made and algorithmically generated content that together produce emergent behavior over an infinite duration. Cheng's work highlights the capacity of simulation to express the unpredictable dynamic between order and chaos in a complex system. Cheng coined the term “live simulation” as a subset of simulation that is presented in public in real-time without regard for an optimal outcome or pre-defined fitness criteria. Since 2013, Cheng has produced a series of simulations exploring an AI-based agent's capacity to deal with an ever-changing environment.

From 2015 to 2017, Cheng developed Emissaries, a trilogy of episodic live simulations that “explore the history of cognitive evolution, past and future.” Unlike previous simulations, Emissaries introduced a narrative agent, the emissary, whose motivation to enact a story was set into conflict with the open-ended chaos of the simulation. Cheng describes the archetype of the emissary as one who "is caught between unravelling old realities and emerging weird one," an embodied way to explore the relationship between meaning and meaninglessness. Cheng drew inspiration from the narrative nature of consciousness described by Julian Jaynes in The Origin of Consciousness in the Breakdown of the Bicameral Mind.

At Serpentine Galleries in 2018, Cheng premiered BOB (Bag of Beliefs), an AI-based creature whose personality, body, and life script evolve across exhibitions in what Cheng calls “art with a nervous system.”

BOB premiered in the United States in 2019 at Gladstone Gallery. BOB features a unique model of AI that combines an inductive engine for the learning of rule-based beliefs from sensory experiences with a motivational framework composed of mini-personalities called "demons". Each demon competes for control of BOB's body in a "congress of demons", and each utilizes the inductive engine to identify affordances in the environment relevant to its motivations. Viewers were invited to send their own stream of stimulating offerings to BOB through BOB Shrine, a mobile app. Viewers could attach a "parental caption" to each offering, thereby forcing a correction to BOB's beliefs.

At LUMA Arles in April 2021, Cheng premiered Life After BOB: The Chalice Study, the first episode in a planned anime series built in the Unity game engine and presented in real-time. Life After BOB envisions a future in which life can be AI-optimised, explored through the story of a neural engineer who implants an AI system in his ten year old daughter's brain to guide her through life. This results in a dilemma in which the child's life is lived without her real participation and in which she is alienated from her AI alter ego. Life After BOB toured from 2022 to 2024, showing at LUMA Westbau, The Shed, Leeum Museum, Light Art Space, Pillar Corrias, HEK Basel and MMCA.

== Collections ==
Cheng's work is collected by institutions including Museum of Modern Art, New York; Whitney Museum of American Art, New York; Museum of Contemporary Art, Los Angeles; Migros Museum, Zurich; Louis Vuitton Foundation, Paris; Astrup Fearnley Museum, Oslo; Fondazione Sandretto Re Rebaudengo, Turin; Julia Stoschek Collection, Düsseldorf; Yuz Museum, Shanghai.

In 2023, Museum of Modern Art acquired tokenized editions of Cheng's 3FACE, a dynamic generative artwork that analyzes the blockchain wallet data of its owner to “generate a visual portrait of the forces that compose the owner’s personality.”

== Other activities ==
Cheng directed the music video for American band Liars' "Brats" in 2012.

At Frieze London in 2013, Cheng premiered Entropy Wrangler Cloud, one of the first artworks made for virtual reality, using first generation Oculus Rift headsets.

Cheng developed Bad Corgi, an iOS app commissioned by Serpentine Galleries, which has been called a "shadowy mindfulness app for contemplating chaos."

== Exhibitions ==
- Entropy Wrangler Off Vendome, Düsseldorf, 2013
- Entropy Wrangler Cloud, Frame, Frieze London, London, 2013
- Ian Cheng, curated by Filipa Ramos, Triennale Di Milano, Milan, 2014
- "Real Humans", curated by Elodie Evers, Irina Raskin, Kunsthalle Düsseldorf, 2015
- Emissary in the Squat of Gods, curated by Hans Ulrich Obrist, Fondazione Sandretto Re Rebaudengo, Turin, 2015
- Emissary Forks At Perfection at Pilar Corrias, London, 2015
- Stranger, Museum of Contemporary Art Cleveland, 2016
- Suspended Animation, curated by Gianni Jetzer, Hirshhorn Museum, Washington, 2016
- WELT AM DRAHT, Julia Stoschek Collection, Berlin, 2016
- Liverpool Biennial 2016, Liverpool, 2016
- Take Me (I’m Yours), Jewish Museum, New York, 2016
- Dreamlands: Immersive Cinema and Art 1905–2016 at Whitney Museum of American Art, 2016
- Forking at Perfection at Migros Museum, 2016
- "Ten Days Six Nights" at Tate Modern, 2017
- Emissaries at MoMA PS1, 2017
- Ian Cheng at Carnegie Museum of Art, 2017
- Being There at Louisiana Museum of Modern Art, 2017
- Etre moderne: Le MoMA à Paris at Fondation Louis Vuitton, 2017
- Emissaries at Julia Stoschek Collection, 2018
- BOB at Serpentine Galleries, 2018
- BOB at Gladstone Gallery, 2019
- New Order: Art and Technology in the Twenty-First Century at the Museum of Modern Art, New York, 2019
- May You Live in Interesting Times at 58th Venice Biennale, 2019
- If the Snake at Okayama Art Summit, 2019
- Mud Muses at Moderna Museet, Stockholm, 2019
- Uncanny Valley: Being Human in the Age of AI at de Young Museum, 2020
- Emissaries at Fundacion Fernando de Castro, 2020
- Life After BOB: The Chalice Study at Light Art Space, Berlin, 2022
