= Benjamin Buchloh =

German art historian

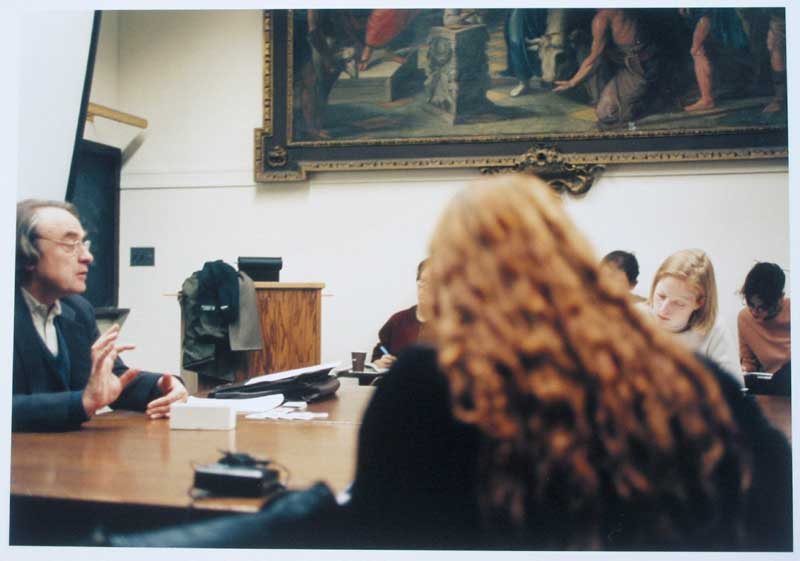
- Benjamin Buchloh (left) giving a lecture at Columbia University in 1995.
- Born: Benjamin Heinz-Dieter Buchloh; November 15, 1941 (age 84); Cologne, Germany
- Education: Freie Universität Berlin; City University of New York
- Occupations: Art historian Professor
- Spouse: Louise Lawler (m. 1981; div. 1995)

Benjamin Heinz-Dieter Buchloh (born November 15, 1941) is a German art historian. Between 2005 and 2021 he was the Andrew W. Mellon Professor of Modern Art in the History of Art and Architecture department at Harvard University.

== Education and career ==
Born in Cologne, Germany on November 15, 1941, Buchloh received a M.Phil in German literature from the Freie Universität Berlin in 1969. He later obtained his Ph.D. in art history in 1994 from the Graduate Center at the City University of New York, where he studied with fellow art historian Rosalind Krauss.

After time as an editor for German art journal Interfunktionen and teaching stints at the Kunstakademie Düsseldorf, NSCAD University, and CalArts, Buchloh began teaching art history at the State University of New York at Old Westbury and the University of Chicago. He later taught at the Massachusetts Institute of Technology as an associate professor from 1989 to 1994. From 1991 to 1993, he also served as the Director of Critical and Curatorial Studies for the Whitney Museum of American Art Independent Study Program. He then taught at both Columbia University and its sister college, Barnard College, as Virginia B. Wright Professor of Twentieth-Century and Contemporary Art from 1994 to 2005, including service as a department chair from 1997 to 2000.

In 2005, he joined the Harvard University department of History of Art and Architecture. He was named Franklin D. and Florence Rosenblatt Professor of Modern Art. In 2006, he was named Andrew W. Mellon Professor of Modern Art. In 2007, Buchloh won the Golden Lion award at the 2007 Venice Biennale for his work as an art historian towards contributing to contemporary art. In fall 2009, Benjamin Buchloh resided at the American Academy in Berlin as a Daimler Fellow. In 2021 he retired from teaching.

Buchloh is currently a co-editor of the art journal October and in 2022 completed a monograph of Gerhard Richter titled Gerhard Richter: Painting After the Subject of History.

== Works ==
His book, Neo-Avantgarde and Culture Industry (2000), is a collection of eighteen essays on major figures of postwar art written since the late 1970s. It covers Nouveau Réalisme in France (Arman, Yves Klein, Jacques de la Villeglé), postwar German art (Joseph Beuys, Sigmar Polke, Gerhard Richter), American Fluxus and Pop Art (Robert Watts and Andy Warhol), minimalism and postminimal art (Michael Asher and Richard Serra), and European and American conceptual art (Daniel Buren, Dan Graham).

Buchloh addresses some artists in terms of their oppositional approaches to language and painting, for example, Nancy Spero and Lawrence Weiner. About others, he asks more general questions concerning the development of models of institutional critique (Hans Haacke) and the theorization of the museum (Marcel Broodthaers); and addresses the formation of historical memory in postconceptual art (James Coleman).

The second volume of Buchloh's collected essays Formalism and Historicity: Models and Methods in Twentieth-Century Art was released in February 2015. The essays are on thematic and historical issues in twentieth-century art including the "return to order", Soviet "factography", and the "paradigm repetitions" of the neo-avant-garde.

=== Bibliography ===
- Dissent: The Issue of Modern Art In Boston, Institute of Contemporary Art, 1986, ISBN 978-0-910663-43-4
- Gerhard Richter: Paintings, 1988, (Terry Neff, editor), Thames & Hudson, 1988. ISBN 978-0-500-01442-4
- Gerhard Richter: 18 Oktober 1977, Walther König,1989. ISBN 978-0500289525
- The Work of Andy Warhol, (Gary Garrels, editor), Bay Press, 1989, ISBN 978-0-941920-11-7
- "Conceptual Art 1962–1969: From Aesthetic of Administration to the Critique of Institutions," October 55 (Winter 1990).
- Andy Warhol: A Retrospective (with Kynaston McShine and Robert Rosenblum), Museum of Modern Art, 1989, ISBN 978-0870706806
- Gerhard Richter: Documenta IX 1992, 1993, ISBN 978-0944219119
- Gerhard Richter (with José Lebrero), Museo Nacional Centro de Arte Reina Sofia, 1994, ISBN 978-8480260336
- James Coleman: Projected Images 1972–1994 (with Lynne Cooke), Dia Art Foundation, 1995, ISBN 978-0944521311
- Gabriel Orozco: An Exhibition Catalogue, ICA London, July 25–September 22, 1996, ISBN 978-1-900300-06-3
- Experiments in the Everyday—Allan Kaprow and Robert Watts: Events, Objects, Documents (with Judith Rodenbeck), Wallach Art Gallery, 2000, ISBN 978-1884919077
- Thomas Struth: Portraits (with Thomas Weski), Marian Goodman Gallery, 2001, ISBN 978-3888140969
- Gerhard Richter: Acht Grau, Hatje Cantz, 2002, ISBN 978-3775712750
- Allan Sekula: Performance Under Working Conditions (with Karner Dietrich), 2003, ISBN 978-3901107405
- Neo-Avantgarde and Culture Industry: Essays on European and American Art from 1955 to 1975, MIT Press, 2003, ISBN 978-0262523479
- Art Since 1900 with Hal Foster, Rosalind Krauss, and Yve-Alain Bois, Thames & Hudson, 2004, ISBN 978-0500238189
- Thomas Hirschhorn, Phaidon Press, 2004, ISBN 978-0714842738
- Flashback: Revisiting The Art of the Eighties (with John Armleder), Hatje Cantz, 2006, ISBN 978-3775716314
- Hans Haacke: For Real (with Rosalyn Deutsche), Richter Verlag, 2007, ISBN 978-3937572598
- Andy Warhol—Shadows and Other Signs of Life: Anniversary Notes for Andy Warhol, Walther König, 2008, ISBN 978-3865603845
- Ground Zero (with David Brussel and Isa Genzken), Steidl, 2008, ISBN 978-3865603845
- Nancy Spero: Dissidances (with Mignon Nixon and Hélène Cixous), Museu d'Art Contemporani Barcelona, 2008, ISBN 978-8489771604
- Bauhaus 1919–1933: Workshops for Modernity (with Barry Bergdoll, Leah Dickerman, and Brigid Doherty), Museum of Modern Art, 2009, ISBN 978-0870707582
- Gerhard Richter: Large Abstracts (with Gregor Stemmrich), Hatje Cantz, 2009, ISBN 978-3775722490
- Art Since 1900 (volume 1 1900 to 1944, with Hal Foster, Yve-Alain Bois, and Rosalind Krauss), Thames and Hudson, 2011, ISBN 978-0500289525
- Formalism and Historicity: Models and Methods in Twentieth-Century Art, MIT Press, 2015, ISBN 978-0262028523
- Sarah Sze, with Okwui Enwezor and Laura Hoptman, Phaidon Press, 2016. ISBN 978-0714870465
- Gerhard Richter's Birkenau Paintings, Walther König, 2016. ISBN 978-3-86335-886-0
- Gerhard Richter—Painting After the Subject of History, MIT Press. 2022. ISBN 978-0262543538
- From Posada to Isotype, from Kollwitz to Catlett: Exchanges of Political Print Culture: Germany-Mexico, 1900-1968, curated and edited by Benjamin H.D. Buchloh and Michelle Harewood, Museo Nacional Centro de Arte Reina Sofía, Madrid, 2022. ISBN 9788480266376
- Exit Interview: Benjamin Buchloh in Conversation with Hal Foster, MIT Press, 2024. ISBN 978-1-949484-06-9
