= Claudia La Rocco =

New York Times dance critic

Claudia La Rocco is an American poet, critic, and performer who works as a columnist for Artforum and writes about books and theater for The New York Times.

== Education ==
La Rocco graduated from Bowdoin College in 2000 with a degree in English.

== Career ==
La Rocco began her dance and theater critic career as a general arts writer for the Associated Press. Beginning in 2005, she joined The New York Times as their dance critic until 2013. She founded thePerformanceClub.org, which won a 2011 Creative Capital/Warhol Foundation Arts Writers Grant and focuses on criticism as a literary art form. She teaches at the School of Visual Arts MFA Art Criticism and Writing program.

== Publications ==
- 2014. The Best Most Useless Dress. Badlands Unlimited
- 2015. I Don't Poem: An Anthology of Painters. Off the Park Press
- 2015. Dancers, Buildings, People in the Streets. Danspace Project
