= Douglas Crimp =

American philosopher and gender studies academic (born 1956)

- Born: John Douglas Crimp; August 19, 1944; Coeur d'Alene, Idaho, U.S.
- Died: July 5, 2019 (aged 74); New York City, U.S.

Education
- Education: Tulane University, City University of New York

Philosophical work
- Institutions: University of Rochester, The School of Visual Arts
- Main interests: queer theory; political philosophy; ethics; psychoanalysis; phenomenology; feminist theory; sexuality; gender studies; institutional critique; postmodernism

John Douglas Crimp (August 19, 1944 – July 5, 2019) was an American art historian, critic, curator, and AIDS activist. He was known for his scholarly contributions to the fields of postmodern theories and art, institutional critique, dance, film, queer theory, and feminist theory. His writings are marked by a conviction to merge the often disjunctive worlds of politics, art, and academia. From 1977 to 1990, he was the managing editor of the journal October. Before his death, Crimp was Fanny Knapp Allen Professor of Art History and professor of Visual and Cultural Studies at the University of Rochester.

== Early life and education ==
Born to Doris and John Carter Crimp and raised in Coeur d'Alene, Idaho, Crimp went to Tulane University in New Orleans on a scholarship to study art history. His career started after moving to New York City in 1967, where he worked as a curatorial assistant at the Solomon R. Guggenheim Museum and as an art critic, writing for Art News and Art International. In 1967, Crimp worked briefly for the couturier Charles James, helping him organize his papers to write his memoir.

Between 1971 and 1976, Crimp taught at The School of Visual Arts, then enrolled in graduate school at the Graduate Center at CUNY where he studied contemporary art and art theory with Rosalind Krauss. In 1977, he became the managing editor of the journal October, which had been founded by Rosalind Krauss, Annette Michelson, and Jeremy Gilbert-Rolfe in 1976. He was quickly appointed to be a co-editor, and he was a central figure in the journal until he left.

In 1990, Crimp was "pushed out," as he put it, from his role at October when his co-editors refused to publish two papers from the "How Do I Look?" conference held at Anthology Film Archives in the fall of 1989. "I think there was homophobia involved," his friend Rosalyn Deutsche told the New York Times. In his resignation letter accompanying the Summer 1990 issue, he noted that the full proceedings of the conference had originally been scheduled for publication. "It seemed to me that decisions based on certain notions of quality, or of theoretical correctness or sophistication, would distort the actual conditions of current lesbian and gay work," he wrote.

Shortly after he left October, Crimp taught gay studies at Sarah Lawrence College. In 1992, he began teaching in the Visual and Cultural Studies Program at the University of Rochester, where he was the Fanny Knapp Allen Professor of Art History.

== Work ==
Crimp was an important critic in the development of postmodern art theory. In 1977, he curated the influential exhibition Pictures at Artists Space, presenting the early work of Sherrie Levine, Jack Goldstein, Philip Smith, Troy Brauntuch, and Robert Longo. Two years later, he elaborated the discussion of postmodern artistic strategies in an essay with the same title in October, including Cindy Sherman in what came to be known as the "Pictures Generation." In his 1980 October essay On the Museum's Ruins he applied the ideas of Foucault to an analysis of museums, describing them as an "institution of confinement" comparable to the asylums and prisons that are the subjects of Foucault's investigations. His essays on postmodernist art and institutional critique were published in the 1993 book On the Museum’s Ruins.

In 1985, Crimp was one of numerous art critics, curators, and artists who spoke at a General Services Administration hearing in defense of Richard Serra's controversial public sculpture Tilted Arc, which had been commissioned as a site-specific piece for Federal Plaza in New York City and was ultimately removed in 1989.

In 1987, Crimp edited a special AIDS-issue of October, titled AIDS: Cultural Analysis/Cultural Activism. In his introduction to the edition, Crimp argued for "cultural practices actively participating in the struggle against AIDS and its cultural consequences." During this time, he was an active member of the AIDS-activist group ACT UP in New York. Mourning and Militancy (1989) discusses the connections between the artistic representations of mourning and the politic interventions of militancy. Crimp argues that these two opposing positions should be allowed to co-exist. In 1990, he published a book titled AIDS Demo Graphics on the activist esthetics of ACT UP together with Adam Rolston. Crimp's work on AIDS has been seen as an important contribution to the development of queer theory in the U.S. In 2002, Crimp published all his previous work on AIDS in the book Melancholia and Moralism – Essays on AIDS and Queer Politics. Feminist scholar Diana Fuss and cultural critic Phillip Brian Harper urged Crimp to publish his notes "over dinner one summer evening."

In 2016, Crimp published his memoir Before Pictures on the relationship between the art world and the gay world in New York in the 1960s and 1970s. The book begins in his hometown in Idaho, where he escapes to New York to write criticism for ARTnews while working at the Solomon R. Guggenheim Museum. Working as a curatorial assistant at the Guggenheim, Crimp notes that he was one of the few to see Daniel Buren’s Peinture-Sculpture before it was removed from the museum. Crimp details his days working at the Chelsea Hotel for designer Charles James, spending his evenings watching film and ballet, and his early years at the art journal October. Crimp also describes New York City nightlife in the 1960s and 1970s during the rise of garage, house, and disco music, recreational drugs, and late nights alongside the Warhol crowd at Max’s Kansas City. Later, Crimp describes how he began to focus his attention to activism dedicated to rethinking AIDS.

== Death ==
Crimp died from multiple myeloma at his home in Manhattan on July 5, 2019. He was 74.

== Bibliography ==
=== Books ===
- Crimp, Douglas, ed. (1988). AIDS: Cultural Analysis/Cultural Activism. Cambridge, Massachusetts: MIT Press. ISBN 9780262031400.
- AIDS Demo Graphics. Seattle: Bay Press, 1990 (with Adam Rolston) ISBN 978-0941920162
- On the Museum's Ruins. Cambridge, Massachusetts: MIT Press, 1993 ISBN 9780262032094
- Melancholia and Moralism—Essays on AIDS and Queer Politics. Cambridge, Massachusetts: MIT Press, 2002 ISBN 9780262032957
- "Our Kind of Movie": The Films of Andy Warhol. Cambridge, Massachusetts: MIT Press, 2012 ISBN 9780262017299
- Before Pictures. Chicago, IL: University of Chicago Press, 2016 ISBN 9780226423456
- Dance, Dance Film. New York: Dancing Foxes Press/Galerie Buchholz (will be published Summer 2021) ISBN 978-1733688949

=== Essays ===
- "Pictures," October, vol. 8 (Spring 1979), pp. 75-88.
- "The Photographic Activity of Postmodernism," October, vol. 15 (Winter 1980), pp. 91-101.
- "Fassbinder, Franz, Fox, Elvira, Erwin, Armin, and All the Others," October, vol. 21 (Summer 1982), pp. 62-81.
- "AIDS: Cultural Analysis/Cultural Activism," October, vol. 43 (Winter 1987), pp. 3-16.
- "Mourning and Militancy," October, vol. 51 (Winter 1989), pp. 3-18.
- "Getting the Warhol We Deserve," Social Text, vol. 17, no. 2 (Summer 1999), pp. 49-66.
- "Yvonne Rainer, Muciz Lover," Grey Room, vol. 22 (Winter 2006), pp. 49-67.
- "Merce Cunningham: Dancers, Artworks, and People in the Galleries," Artforum International, vol. 47, no. 2 (October 2008), pp. 347-355, 407, 410.
- "You Can Still See Her: The Art of Trisha Brown," Artforum International, vol. 49, no. 5 (January 2011), pp. 154-159, 242.

=== Interviews ===
- Cathy Caruth and Thomas Keenan: "The AIDS Crisis Is Not Over": A Conversation With Gregg Bordowitz, Douglas Crimp, and Laura Pinsky. American Imago, vol. 48, no. 4 (Winter 1991), pp. 539-556.
- Takemoto, Tina (2003). "The Melancholia of AIDS: Interview with Douglas Crimp". Art Journal. 62 (4). Archived from the original on February 12, 2007 – via FindArticles.
- Mathias Danbolt: Front Room Back Room: An Interview with Douglas Crimp in Trikster - Nordic Queer Journal #2, 2008.

=== Critical studies and reviews ===
- Wilson, Jake (April 2013). "Elbows on his knees". Australian Book Review. 350: 44. Review of "Our kind of movie".
