= Philippe Perrin (artist) =

French contemporary sculptor and photographer

- Heaven by Philippe Perrin
- Born: 10 August 1964 (age 62); La Tronche, France
- Occupation: Artist

Philippe Perrin (born 10 August 1964) is a French contemporary sculptor and photographer who lives and works in Paris. His works are in the collections of the Maison Européenne de la Photographie in Paris and the Musée d'art contemporain de Lyon.

== Biography ==
Philippe Perrin was born in 1964 in La Tronche. Graduate of the École supérieure d'art de Grenoble, his work has been the subject of many gallery and museum shows, including his retrospective at the Maison Européene de la Photographie, at the Fondation Maeght, as well being sold in public auction, including the work 'Couteau' sold by Sotheby's Paris in the sale 'The Secret Garden of Marianne and Pierre Nahon' in 2004.

== Work ==
From Perrin's work emerge symbols of violence taken from a variety of genres, such as crime fiction, cinema, or popular culture. He also plays with the question of scale of the object: the gram of coke becomes a kilogram; a razor blade and a revolver are presented as very large. For the French art critic Nicolas Bourriaud, "Perrin is a manipulator of signs, interpreting the relationship between reality and fiction through a question of scale, treating in the same manner the relation between a true biography and that of the figure of a celebrity."

A work representative of Perrin's language of allegory-visual suggestion his "Skyline": seven ball cartridges of variable sizes respect the measures of the space where they are inserted, forming a front: first line of a fighting army or a skyscrapers seafront.

He is mentioned on the first page of Chapter 22 of Michel Houellebecq's novel "The Elementary Particles" as a "mediocre artist" whose work decorates a "midrange hotel with a foul ambience."

== Exhibitions ==
=== Main solo shows ===
- 2020 : "PHILIPPE PERRIN". L’Approche. Molenbeek –Bruxelles.
- 2019 : "WELCOME TO BANYULS". Musée Maillol, Banyuls, France
- 2018 : "SHOT BY BOTH SIDES". 59pm. Bruxelles
- 2017 : "SULFURES". Incognito Artclub. Paris
- 2014 : " Kung Foo Cowboy ", Incognito Artclub, Paris.
- 2013 : " Kill Me ", Recreation of the 1993 performance, Musée de la Chasse et de la Nature, Paris.
- 2012 : " Under the gun ", Musée Maillol, Paris, France.
- 2010 : " Haut et Court ", Maison européenne de la photographie, Paris, France.
- 2009 : " Philippe Perrin ", Gallery Albert Benamou, Paris, France.
- 2009 : " Agrandissements ", Gallery Maeght, Paris, France.
- 2006 : " Heaven ", monumental installation for the Nuit Blanche.
- 2006 : " Shootingstar ", Xin Dong Cheng Gallery, Beijing, China.
- 2004 : " Philippe Perrin Superstar ", Guy Pieters Gallery, Knokke, Belgique
- 2001 : " Poupestroy ", Gallery R&L Beaubourg, Paris, France.
- 1997 : " Les Mystères de Paris ", Maison européenne de la photographie, Paris, France.
- 1997 : " Rendez-vous au ciel ", Gallery R&L Beaubourg, Paris, France.
- 1989 : " La Panoplie ", Philippe Perrin at the Galerie Perrotin, Paris, France.

=== Main group shows ===
- 2019 : « LA VIE EST UN FILM ». Curated by Ben Vautier. Le 109. Nice
- 2019 : « LIBERTE, LIBERTE CHERIE ». Ancien bagne. Nice
- 2019 : « ARTA ». Saisons croisées. Bucarest
- 2019 : « PORTE ENTROUVERTE ». Freeport. Luxembourg.
- 2019 : « ARTA ». Saisons croisées. Grenoble.
- 2018 : « L’ESPRIT D’UNE COLLECTION ». Fondation Maeght. St-Paul de Vence. F
- 2018 : « LA PHOTOGRAPHIE FRANCAISE EXISTE, JE L’AI RENCONTREE ». Maison Européenne de la Photographie. MEP. Paris
- 2018 : " CRUE 1910". Incognito Artclub. Paris
- 2017 : "LA TEMPETE". CRAC, Sète. France
- 2017 :"VARIATIONS". Cité Internationale des Arts, Paris
- 2016 : "M.Y. Foundation" Collection. Musée Olympique. Séoul. Korea
- 2016 : "LES INVENDUS". Collection Albert Benamou. Musée Le Carroi et Hôtel de Ville. Chinon. France
- 2015 : " Chercher le garçon ", Contemporary art museum of Val-de-Marne
- 2014 : « Les Invendus », Albert Benamou Collection, Museum of Le Carroi and Hôtel de Ville.
- 2014 : " Invasao criativa ", Cidade Matarazzo, São Paulo, Brazil.
- 2013 : " Maison européenne de la photographie ", Paris, France.
- 2013 : " L'Œil d'un collectionneur ": Serge Aboukrat, Maison européenne de la photographie, Paris.
- 2012 : " Cibles ", Musée de la Chasse et de la Nature, Paris.
- 2012 : Marlborough Gallery, Monaco (artist group show including Picasso, Miguel Chevalier, François Morellet, Chu Teh-Chun etc.).
- 2012 : " Group show ", Galerie Maeght, Paris.
- 2012 : " Biennale de La Havane ", Cuba, (11th edition).
- 2012 : " 50 artists, one collection ", Fondation Maeght, Saint-Paul de Vence, France.
- 2006 : " Sculptures en plein air ", Xin Dong Cheng Gallery, Beijing.
- 2005 : " Autour de la photographie ", Maison européenne de la photographie, Paris.
- 1996 : " La Colère ", The Pompidou Centre, Paris.
- 1995 : " Passions privées ", Musée d'art moderne de la ville de Paris, Paris.
- 1994 : " Hors limites ", The Pompidou Centre, Paris.
- 1993 : " Krieg (guerre) ", Triennale of photography, Graz.
- 1992 : " Ligne de mire ", Fondation Cartier pour l'art contemporain.

=== Publications ===
- 2010 : Always the Sun, "Catalogue déraisonné 1986 – 2010", Texts by Nicolas Bourriaud et Jean Nouvel
