= Jeffrey Mehlman =

American literary critic and historian

Jeffrey Mehlman (born 1944, New York City) is a literary critic and a historian of ideas. He has taught at Cornell University, Yale University, and Johns Hopkins University, and is currently University Professor and Professor of French Literature at Boston University. He has held visiting professorships at Harvard University, the University of California, Berkeley, CUNY Graduate Center, Washington University in St. Louis, and Massachusetts Institute of Technology. Over a number of years, he has been writing an implicit history of speculative interpretation in France in the form of a series of readings of canonical literary works.

== Published works ==
- A Structural Study of Autobiography: Proust, Leiris, Sartre, Lévi-Strauss (Cornell University Press, 1974)
- Revolution and Repetition: Marx, Hugo, Balzac (University of California Press, 1977) 2018 pbk editions. Univ of California Press. 22 June 2018. ISBN 978-0-520-30222-8.
- Cataract: A Study in Diderot (Wesleyan University Press, 1979)
- Legacies: Of Anti-Semitism in France (University of Minnesota Press, 1983) Mehlman, Jeffrey (1983). pbk edition. U of Minnesota Press. ISBN 0-8166-1178-5.
- Walter Benjamin for Children: An Essay on His Radio Years (University of Chicago Press, 1993) ISBN 0-226-51865-5
- Genealogies of the Text: Literature, Psychoanalysis, and Politics in Modern France (Cambridge University Press, 1995)
- Émigré New York: French Intellectuals in Wartime Manhattan, 1940-1944 (Johns Hopkins University Press, 2000) ISBN 0801862868
- Adventures in the French Trade: Fragments Toward a Life (Stanford University Press, 2010) ISBN 978-0-8047-6962-4

In addition, Mehlman's numerous translations, beginning with his collection French Freud (Yale French Studies 48, 1973), have played an important role in the naturalization of French thought in English.

=== Critical reception ===
A Structural Study of Autobiography was described by Tom Conley as "the first major English-language study incorporating structuralism as method and goal." Revolution and Repetition was saluted by Paul de Man as "one of the very brilliant and entertaining books of the last years" (back cover) and hailed as a "tour de force" by Gregory Ulmer in his article on the "ten best experimental essays written in English in the category of ‘literary criticism’ in the past half-century". Legacies: Of Anti-Semitism in France has been translated into French and Japanese and was the subject of a polemic involving the journals Tel Quel and La Quinzaine littéraire, spilling onto the first page of Le Monde, when it appeared in French in 1984. (Mehlman’s position in the book has since been vindicated in a volume by Jacques Henric. George Steiner, reviewing Walter Benjamin for Children in the Times Literary Supplement, saluted in the book "a scholastic acuity and wit resembling that of Benjamin himself," hailing the "sparkle" of its "erudition and playful intelligence." Finally, Stanley Hoffman wrote in Foreign Affairs of Émigré New York that "previous attempts by literature professors to tackle culture have not always resulted in works as mind-stretching and entertaining as this."

== Awards ==
He has held both Guggenheim and Fulbright Fellowships. In 1994, he was appointed Officer of the Ordre des Palmes Académiques by the French government.
