= John Rajchman =

American philosopher

John Rajchman (born June 25, 1946) is an American philosopher working in the areas of art history, architecture, and continental philosophy. Son of Jan A. Rajchman, a Polish-American computer scientist.

John Rajchman is an adjunct professor and Director of Modern Art M.A. Programs in the Department of Art History and Archaeology at Columbia University. He has previously taught at Princeton University, Massachusetts Institute of Technology, Collège International de Philosophie in Paris, and The Cooper Union, among others.

He is a Contributing Editor for Artforum and is on the board of Critical Space. John Rajchman received a B.A., from Yale University and Ph.D., from Columbia University.

== Works ==
- Michel Foucault: The Freedom of Philosophy (1985)
- Post-analytic Philosophy (1985) editor with Cornel West
- Le Savoir-faire avec l'inconscient : éthique et psychanalyse (1986)
- Philosophical Events: Essays of the '80s (1991)
- Truth and Eros, Foucault, Lacan and the Question of Ethics (1991)
- The Identity in Question (1995) editor
- Constructions (Writing Architecture) (1998)
- The Deleuze Connections (2000)
- Rendre la terre légère (2005)
- French Philosophy Since 1945: Problems, Concepts, Inventions (2011) editor with Etienne Balibar
