= October (journal) =

American academic journal

- Discipline: Contemporary art
- Language: English
- Edited by: Adam Lehner

Publication details
- History: 1976–present
- Publisher: MIT Press (United States)
- Frequency: Quarterly

Standard abbreviations
- ISO 4: October

Indexing
- ISSN: 0162-2870 (print); 1536-013X (web)
- LCCN: 2001-213401
- JSTOR: 01622870
- OCLC no.: 47273509

Links
- Journal homepage; Online access; Online archive

October is an academic journal specializing in contemporary art, criticism, and theory, published by MIT Press.

== History ==
October was established in 1976 in New York by Jeremy Gilbert-Rolfe (who resigned from the journal after the third issue), Rosalind E. Krauss, Annette Michelson and Lucio Pozzi (who withdrew before the first issue was published). The founders of the journal were originally known as "Octoberists". Its name is a reference to the Eisenstein film that set the tone of intellectual, politically engaged writing that has been the hallmark of the journal. The journal was a participant in introducing French post-structural theory on the English-speaking academic scene. According to The Art Story, Krauss used the journal "as a way to publish essays on her emergent ideas on post-structuralist art theory, Deconstructionist theory, psychoanalysis, postmodernism and feminism". Jeremy Gilbert-Rolfe, one of the co-founders of the journal, withdrew after only a few issues, and by the spring of 1977, Douglas Crimp joined the editorial team. In 1990, after Crimp left the journal, Krauss and Michelson were joined by Yve-Alain Bois, Hal Foster, Benjamin H. D. Buchloh, Denis Hollier, and John Rajchman.

== Contents ==
As well as in-depth articles and reviews of 20th century and contemporary art, the journal features critical interpretations of cinema and popular culture from a progressive viewpoint.

== Impact ==
According to Encyclopædia Britannica, the journal was an "influential vehicle for the debate surrounding the emergence of postmodernism and New Historicism in 20th-century art-historical studies", and the journal "contributed greatly to Anglo-American academics' adoption of French theoretical innovations, especially those pertaining to the analysis of cinema". The Art Story describes the journal as "significant for revisiting and stressing the historical importance of early modes of 20th-century avant-garde art, such as Cubism, Surrealism and Expressionism".

== Collections ==
MIT Press has released two anthologies of articles and a book series.
