= Yve-Alain Bois =

Algerian art historian (born 1952)

- Born: April 16, 1952 (age 74); Constantine, Algeria
- Education: Ecole Pratique des Hautes Etudes; Ecole des Hautes Etudes en Sciences Sociales
- Scientific career
- Fields: Art history
- Workplaces: Institute for Advanced Study

Yve-Alain Bois (born April 16, 1952) is a professor emeritus of Art History at the School of Historical Studies at the Institute for Advanced Study in Princeton, New Jersey.

== Education ==
Bois received an M.A. from the École Pratique des Hautes Études in 1973 for his work on El Lissitzky's typography, and a Ph.D. from the École des Hautes Études en Sciences Sociales in 1977 for his work on Lissitzky's and Malevich's conceptions of space. Both of his degrees were supervised under Roland Barthes.

== Career ==
=== Academic ===
Bois is a professor emeritus at the School of Historical Studies at the Institute for Advanced Study in Princeton, New Jersey, in the chair inaugurated by Erwin Panofsky, and at the European Graduate School. From 1991 to 2005, he served on the faculty at Harvard University as Joseph Pulitzer Jr. Professor in Modern Art, after teaching at Johns Hopkins University and at the Centre National de la Recherche Scientifique.

Bois was elected to the American Philosophical Society in 2016.

=== Writing ===
Bois has written books and articles on artists of European modernism. He is an editor of the journal October.

== Articles ==
- "Whose Formalism?" Art Bulletin, Mar. 1996 European Graduate School
- "Review of Tony Smith retrospective at the Museum of Modern Art, New York". Artforum. 37 (3). November 1998. Archived from the original on May 19, 2005 – via FindArticles.
- "Review of "Supports/Surfaces" exhibition at the Galerie Nationale du Jeu de Paume". Artforum. 37 (4). December 1998. Archived from the original on December 26, 2007 – via FindArticles.
- "Bois and Linda Nochlin discuss the Matisse and Picasso exhibition". Artforum. 37 (6). February 1999. Archived from the original on March 17, 2005 – via FindArticles.
- "Review of Barnett Newman retrospective, Philadelphia Museum of Art". Artforum. 40 (7). March 2002. Archived from the original on December 14, 2004 – via FindArticles.
- ""The Mourning After," panel discussion on painting". Artforum. 41 (7). March 2003. Archived from the original on December 26, 2007 – via FindArticles.
- "On Fred Sandback". Artforum. 42 (2). October 2003. Archived from the original on December 26, 2007 – via FindArticles.
