= List of Lebanese painters =

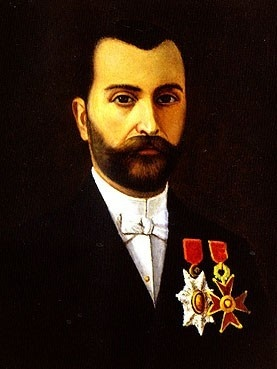
Self portrait by Daoud Corm, 1900

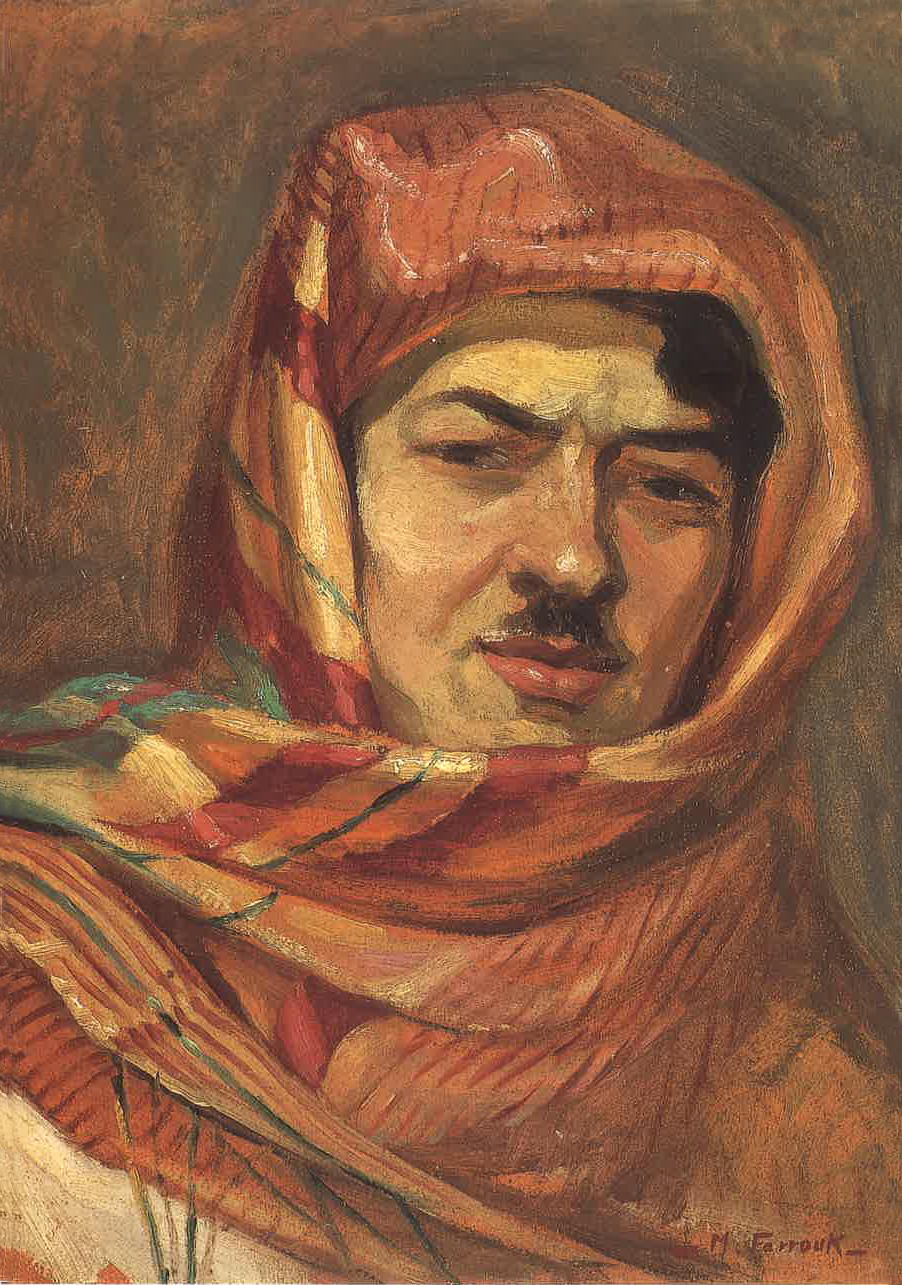
Self portrait by Moustafa Farroukh, 1938

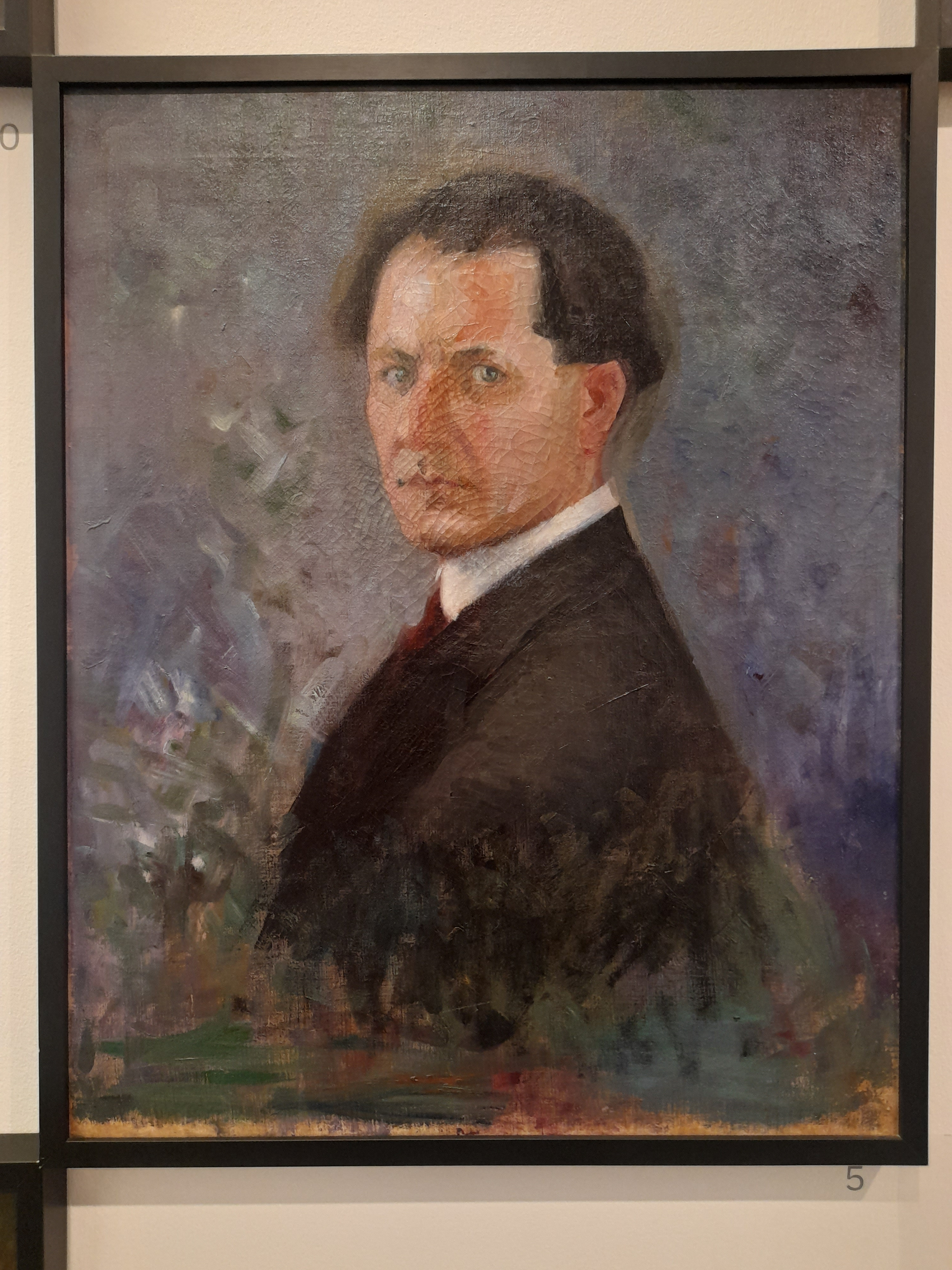
Self portrait by Khalil Saleeby, 1928

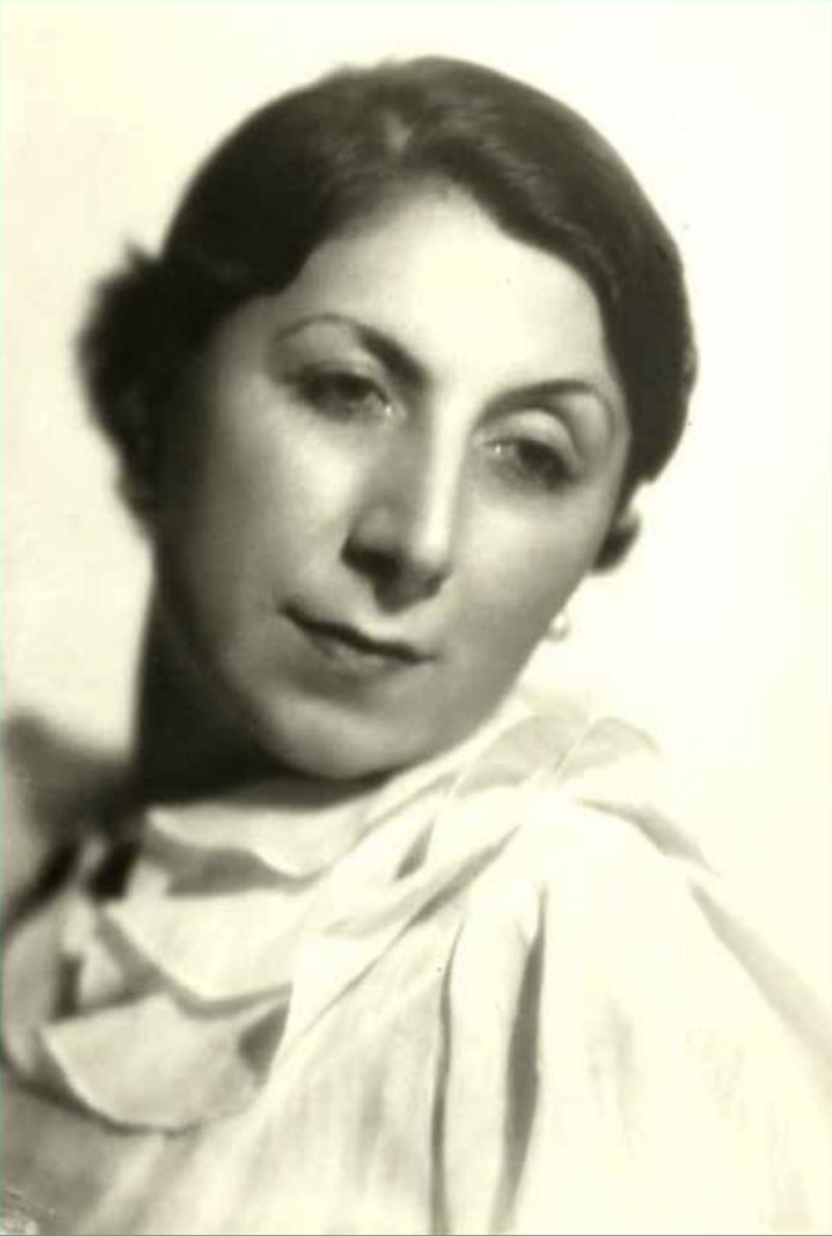
Photo of Bibi Zogbé in 1940

This is a list of Lebanese painters.

- Shafic Abboud
- Etel Adnan
- Krikor Agopian
- Georges Akl
- Zena Assi
- Ayman Baalbaki
- Ghazi Baker
- Mouna Bassili Sehnaoui
- Maha Bayrakdar
- Kiki Bokassa
- Huguette Caland
- Rafic Charaf
- Saloua Raouda Choucair
- Daoud Corm
- David Daoud
- Derrie Fakhoury
- Moustafa Farroukh
- Simone Fattal
- Chucrallah Fattouh
- César Gemayel
- Ibrahim Ghannam
- Laure Ghorayeb
- Kahlil Gibran
- Paul Guiragossian
- Youssef Howayek
- Lamia Joreige
- Nabil Kanso
- Nadim Karam
- Helen Khal
- Zena El Khalil
- Layal Khawly
- Dyala Khodary
- Yolande Labaki
- Blanche Lohéac-Ammoun
- Hussein Madi
- Joseph Matar (artist)
- Farid Mansour (artist)
- Jamil Molaeb
- Philippe Mourani
- Nabil Nahas
- Wajih Nahlé
- Omar Onsi
- Samir Abi Rashed
- Mohammad Rawas
- Aref Rayess
- Khalil Saleeby
- Samir Sammoun
- Ibrahim Serbai
- Habib Serour
- Mounira Al Solh
- Hanibal Srouji
- Alfred Tarazi
- Lidya Tchakerian
- Salwa Zeidan
- Bibi Zogbé

== See also ==
- List of artists from Lebanon
- List of Lebanese people
