= List of artists from Lebanon =

This is a list of artists from, or associated, with Lebanon.

== A ==
- Shafic Abboud (1926–2004), painter
- Lamia Maria Abillama (born 1962), photographer
- Ziad Abillama (born 1969), visual artist and writer
- Zeina Abirached (born 1981), illustrator and comic artist
- Etel Adnan (born 1925), poet and visual artist
- Georges Akl, painter
- Rabih Alameddine (born 1959), painter
- Suzanne Alaywan (born 1974), poet and painter
- Ziad Antar (born 1978), filmmaker and photographer
- Zena Assi (born 1974), painter

== B ==
- Ayman Baalbaki (born 1975), painter
- Lara Baladi (born 1969), photographer and multimedia artist
- Michel Basbous (1921–1981), sculptor and painter
- Mouna Bassili Sehnaoui (born 1945), painter
- Kiki Bokassa (born 1975), conceptual artist
- Gregory Buchakjian (born 1971), filmmaker and photographer
- Ghazi Baker (born 1967), architect and artist

== C ==
- Huguette Caland (1931–2019), painter
- Chaouki Chamoun (born 1942), artist
- Rafic Charaf (1932–2003), painter
- Youmna Chlala, artist, writer
- Saloua Raouda Choucair (1916–2017), painter and sculptor
- Daoud Corm (1852–1930), painter
- Chucrallah Fattouh (born 1956), painter and sculptor

== D ==
- Tagreed Darghouth (born 1979), painter
- Ali Dirani (born 1986), graphic artist

== F ==
- Derrie Fakhoury (1930–2015), painter and medal artist
- Moustafa Farroukh (1901–1957), painter
- Farid Mansour (1929–2010), sculptor and painter

== G ==
- César Gemayel (1898–1958), painter
- Mai Ghoussoub (1952–2007), artist and publisher

== H ==
- Mona Hatoum (born 1952), video and installation artist
- Youssef Howayek (1883–1962), painter and sculptor

== J ==
- Ghada Jamal (born 1955), painter
- Lamia Joreige (born 1972), visual artist and filmmaker

== K ==
- Nabil Kanso (born 1946), painter
- Nadim Karam (born 1957), painter and sculptor
- Mireille Kassar (born 1963), artist and film-maker
- Omran Al-Kaysi (born 1943), artist and art critic
- Helen Khal (1923–2009), artist
- Mahmoud Kahil (1936–2003), cartoonist
- Zena El Khalil (born 1976), artist
- Dyala Khodary (born 1979), painter

== N ==
- Nabil Nahas (born 1949), artist

== R ==
- Rudy Rahme (born 1967), sculptor, painter and poet
- Walid Raad (born 1967), media artist
- Mohammad Rawas (born 1951), painter and printmaker
- Aref Rayess (1928–2005), painter and sculptor

== S ==
- Pierre Sadek (died 2013), cartoonist
- Walid Sadek (born 1966), conceptual artist
- Ramzi T. Salamé (born 1953), writer and painter
- Samir Sammoun (born 1952), painter
- Hanibal Srouji (born 1957), painter
- Tessa Sakhi (born 1991), artist and architect

== T ==
- Lidya Tchakerian (born 1959), artist
- Jalal Toufic, artist and filmmaker

== Y ==
- Paola Yacoub (born 1966), artist

== Z ==
- Akram Zaatari (born 1966), filmmaker and photographer
- Maya Zankoul (born 1986), author and comic artist
- Salwa Zeidan artist and sculptor
- Lamia Ziadé (born 1968), illustrator and visual artist

== See also ==
- List of Lebanese painters
- List of Lebanese people
