= Hussein Madi =

Lebanese painter, sculptor and printmaker (1938–2024)

- حسين ماضي
- Born: 17 January 1938; Shebaa, Lebanese Republic
- Died: 17 January 2024 (aged 86); Beirut, Lebanon
- Other names: Ḥusayn Māḍī
- Citizenship: Lebanon; Italy
- Education: Lebanese Academy of Fine Arts; Accademia di Belle Arti di Roma; l’Académie de San Giacomo
- Occupations: Painter; sculptor; printmaker

Hussein Madi (Arabic: حسين ماضي; 17 January 1938–17 January 2024) was a Lebanese painter, sculptor, and printmaker.

== Early life and education ==
Hussein Madi (Arabic: حسين ماضي) was born on 17 January 1938 in Shebaa, Lebanese Republic (present-day Lebanon).

Madi was educated at the Lebanese Academy of Fine Arts in Beirut. In Italy, Madi studied at the Accademia di Belle Arti di Roma, and the l’Académie de San Giacomo.

== Career ==
From 1958 to 1962, he taught sculpture at the Lebanese Academy of Fine Arts. From 1973 to 1986, he resided in Rome and Beirut, where he researched Arabic cultural heritage. After returning to Lebanon in 1986, he taught sculpture and engraving at the Institute of Fine Arts, Lebanese University.

Madi's artworks are held in private and public collections worldwide, including The Metropolitan Museum of Art, The British Museum, Institut du Monde Arabe, Los Angeles County Museum of Art (LACMA), Museum of Fine Arts Boston, Detroit Institute of Arts (DIA), The Block Museum of Art at Northwestern University, Bowdoin College Museum of Art, MATHAF: Arab Museum of Modern Art in Doha, Qatar, Barjeel Art Foundation, Sharjah Art Museum, The Sursock Museum, MACAM, and The Jordan National Gallery of Fine Arts.

In 2003, he presented his work at the Venice Biennale. He was awarded the Order of the Star of Italy for his contributions.

== Life and work ==
Born in 1938 in Shebaa, South Lebanon, Madi's paintings often explored the interplay between straight and curved lines, reflecting his cultural heritage through the features of Oriental figures. He was known to outline the silhouette of a woman across the entire canvas using quick strokes of a large brush.

Madi's artworks often conveyed two distinct expressions: a static aspect, symbolizing permanence, and a more complex expression conveying suffering or irony. Critic Joseph Silvaggi described Madi's drawings as filled with symbols and rich in artistic conventions presented in simplified forms, "a kind of enchanted script and summary of figurative art in the modern era."

Hussein Madi died on 17 January 2024, at the age of 85.
