= Srouji =

Srouji is a surname. Notable people with the surname include:

- Hanibal Srouji (born 1957), Lebanese painter
- Johny Srouji (born 1964), Arab Israeli computer scientist and business executive
