= Fattouh =

Fattouh is a surname. Notable people with the surname include:

- Chucrallah Fattouh (fl. 1983), Lebanese painter
- Mahassen Fattouh (born 1989), Lebanese weightlifter
- Rawhi Fattuh (born 1949), Palestinian politician
