= Krikor Agopian =

Canadian-Armenian painter

Krikor Agopian is a Canadian-Armenian painter.

Agopian in 2013

== Career ==
He studied commercial, fashion, industrial, and furniture design as a young adult while receiving his education in Canada. He was accepted to Concordia University as a candidate for a degree in electrical engineering thanks to his innovations. After a design course in his major, Agopian was offered an individual exhibition, a rare event for first-year students. On witnessing his work, his professor urged him to switch to fine arts.

== Academic formation ==
- Studio 5316, Montreal, Quebec, Canada
- Washington School of Fine Arts, Seattle, Washington, United States
- Concordia University, Montreal, Quebec, Canada

== Professor ==
- Beirut School Of Fine Arts 1972–73, 1978–80
- Lebanese Academy of Fine Arts 1977-81
- Institute of Fine Arts, 1981-85 Kaslik

== Prizes ==
- Mention of honner, T.M.A, Beirut 1972
- Prizes of Excellence, Makhoul, 1980
- 1st prize, Makhoul, 1981
- National Competition of Visual Arts, Montreal, 1990

2nd Grand Prize, all categories

- National Competition of Visual Arts, Montreal, 1991

2nd Grand Prize all categories

- Nomination: Prize of Artistic Excellence Laval, 1991
- National Competition of Visual Arts, Montreal, 1996

3 rd Grand Prize all categories

- International Competition Visual Arts, Montreal, 1997

1st Prize Abstract.

- International Visual Arts, Montreal, 1998

1st Trophy • Surrealism

== Bibliography ==
- Participated in numerous international radio and television programs.
- Multiple works reproduced in many art magazines.

Multiple articles in international magazines:

- Magazine Art International (1991 No.4)
- Parcours (1992 No sept.)
- Marché de l’art Guide vallée (3 e. édition)
- Applied Arts (1990 Vol. 5) etc.
- Guide de Roussan 2009 etc.

Participated in more than 250 collective exhibition in Canada, United States, Europe and the Middle East. Agopian's art work can be found in many private and public collections, museums, art societies in Canada, United States, Europe and the Middle East.
