= Mahmoud Hammad =

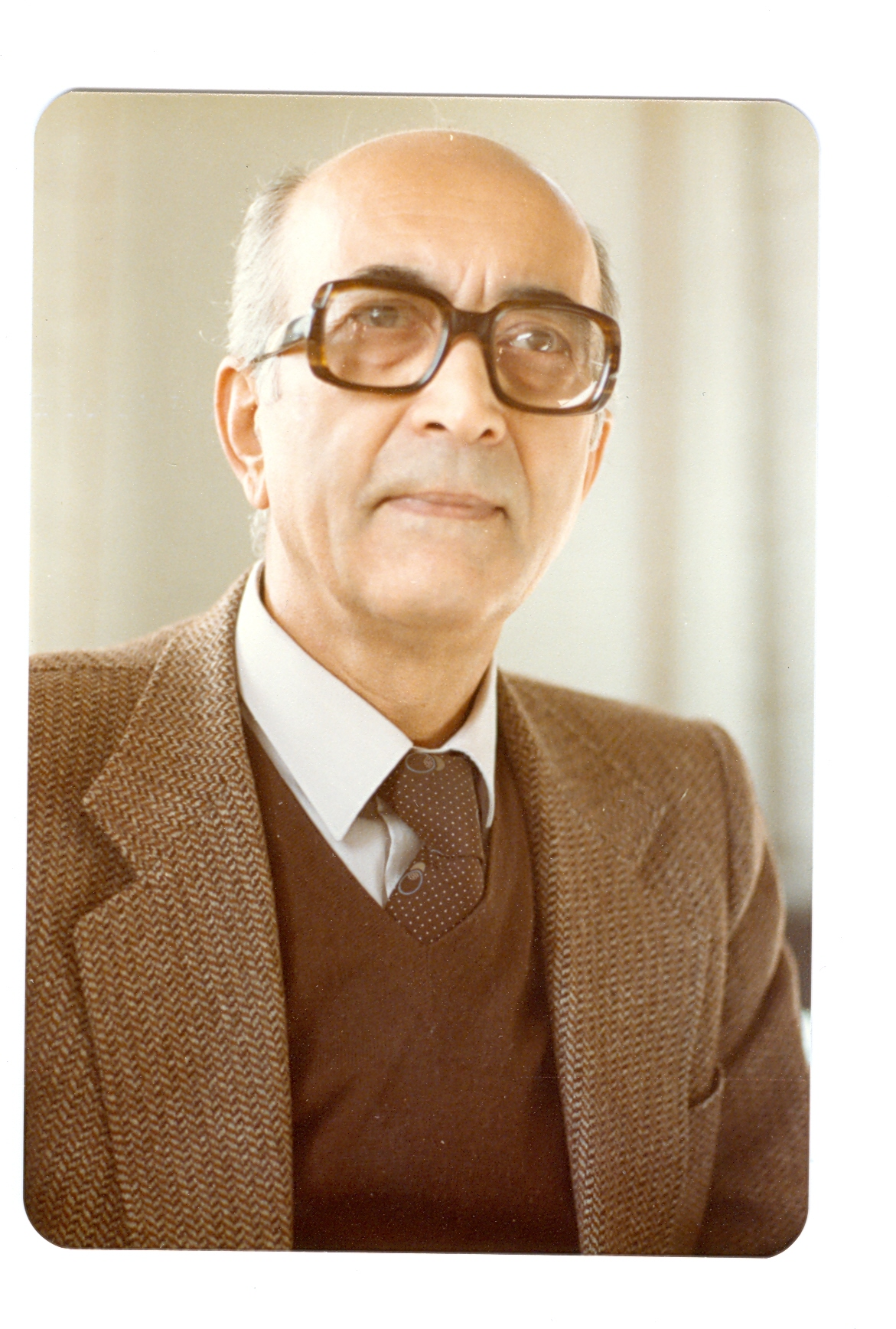
- Born: 1923; Damascus, Syria
- Died: 1988 (aged 64–65); Damascus, Syria
- Education: Accademia di belle arti di Roma
- Known for: Painting, Print-making, engraving
- Movement: Hurufiyya movement
- Spouse: Derrie Fakhoury
- Website: Mahmoud Hammad

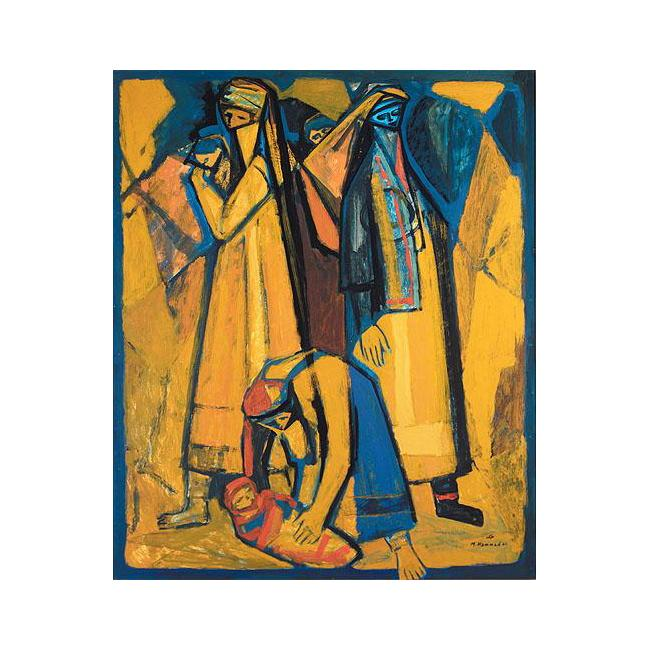

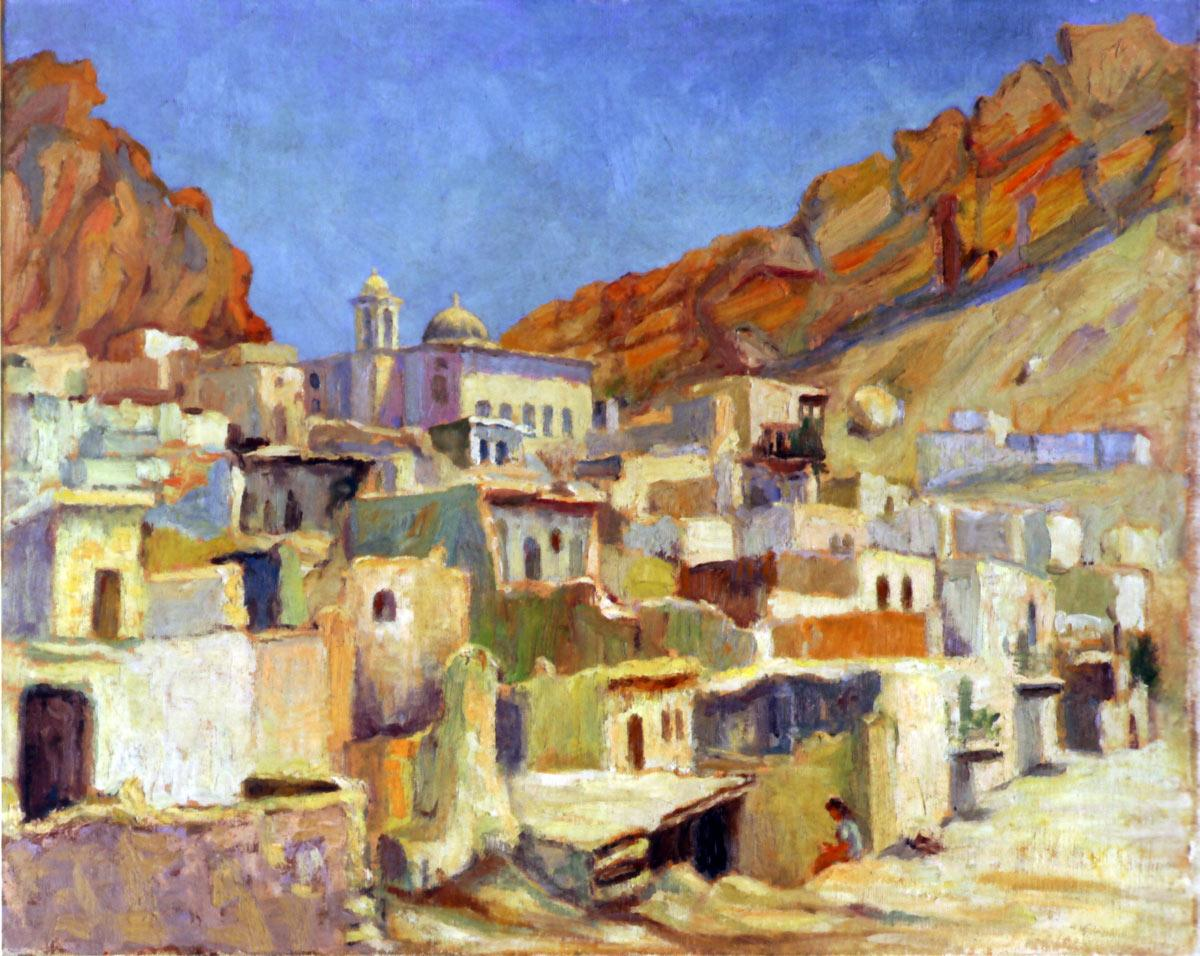

Mahmoud Hammad (1923–1988) was a Syrian painter and pioneer of modern Syrian art.

== Life and career ==
Hammad was born 1923 in Damascus, Syria. He studied art at the Accademia di belle arti di Roma between 1953 and 1957. He focused on the art of engraving and especially the art medals. After completing his studies he returned to Damascus in 1960 and taught as professor at the Fine Arts Faculty of Damascus since its creation. From 1970 until 1980, he became dean at the Fine Arts Faculty of Damascus. In 1939, he started exhibiting his work throughout most Arab countries, Europe and the United States. In 1948, he received first prize in Arts in Damascus Exhibition, in 1957, first prize at the competition of the city of Naples, and in 1959, first prize at the competition of Ministry of Culture in United Arab Republic. In his work, Hammad uses the geometry of elementary forms to express the dynamic spirit of the Arabic letter. Among circles, squares, rectangles, determined by the color, the letter appears with liberty to end a profound silence.

His work has been shown in exhibitions at museums such as the Jordan National Gallery of Fine Arts.

He was married to Derrie Fakhoury.

He died 1988 in Damascus, Syria.

== Work ==
Hammad uses Arabic phrases in abstract compositions. He interweaves the letters to create a mass of geometric forms. He tries to use forms that are familiar in Islamic culture. This use of Arabic calligraphy as a graphic form places him within the Hurufiyah Art Movement. The art historian, Wijdan Ali describes his style of painting as 'Abstract Calligraphy' within the Hurufiyya movement.

Select list of paintings

- Farmers In Palestine, 1958
- Ard Halji, 1961
- Glory to God, 1985
- Iqraa Bism
- Ikal Wa Tawakkal
- Memory of the First of February: The Arab Unity (study)

== Awards ==
- 1948: First prize in Arts in Damascus Exhibition
- 1957: First prize at the competition of the city of Naples
- 1959: First prize at the competition of Ministry of Culture in United Arab Republic
- 1975: Knight Commander Award from the Republic of Italy
- 1989: He was awarded the Syrian First Class Order of Merit by the Syrian Republic after his death.
