= Layal Khawly =

Lebanese artist

- Born: Beirut
- Education: Lebanese Academy of Fine Arts
- Known for: Painting
- Notable work: الثورة (Revolution)
- Website: https://layalkhawly.com

Layal Khawly (in Arabic: ليال الخولي) is a Lebanese visual artist and painter

== Biography ==
Khawly was born in the capital of Lebanon, Beirut. As a child, she was already considered gifted and recognized for her unique drawings and paintings.

She studied interior architecture and obtained a master's degree in visual arts at the Lebanese Academy of Fine Arts in 2014 to pursue her lifelong passion.

== Career ==
In 2016, Khwaly was selected to representLebanon at the National Museum of Art in Shanghai by the Chinese Ministry of Culture One year later, she was appointed as an art facilitator with UNESCO Beirut's project "Shared World's Heritage Values for Common Grounds", an artistic approach with refugees in co-operation with the Ministry of Higher Education in Lebanon.

This event was followed by an exhibition at the World Bank's hall entrance in Washington DC and participation in Expo Dubai 2020.

One of Layal's most famous paintings is of Lebanon's evergreen cedar trees hanging at the presidential palace in Lebanon.

In January 2021, she signed an artistic cooperation agreement with Belvedere Art Space, an international art exhibition.

In September 2021, Lebanon selected Khawly as a main representative NGO ambassador for Lebanon of Tomorrow whose main objective is to provide economic, financial, moral support and assistance in justice, equality and unity

In 2022, she revealed her first gallery series, Alone Not Lonely.

== Style ==
Through her pool of curiosity and self-expression, Khawly decided to use her art for the common good allowing those who cannot express themselves to be represented through her, allowing nobody to truly ever feel alone.

== Honours and awards ==
2016: Appreciation Prize - Chinese Ministry of Culture
