= Modern and Contemporary Art Museum =

The Modern And Contemporary Art Museum in Alita - MACAM
- Location within Lebanon
- Established: 2013
- Location: Alita, Lebanon
- Coordinates: 34.091164°N 35.687372°E
- Type: Art Museum
- Collection size: 400 sculptures and installations
- Director: Diala Nammour
- Website: MACAM

MACAM, the Modern And Contemporary Art Museum, opened in June 2013, in a factory compound in Alita. Operated by a Lebanese NGO holding the same name, this museum is dedicated to preserving and promoting Lebanese modern and contemporary art.

== History ==
The museum presents a selection of 400 sculptures and installations created by 90 artists born or having lived in Lebanon.

== Permanent displays ==
The museum's permanent collections are distributed in two halls, one dedicated to Lebanese sculpture and the other to Lebanese installations.

=== The Sculpture Hall ===
The collection is organised according to the material used by the sculptor.

=== The Installation Hall ===
This hall covers 1,500 metres (4,900 ft) of indoor exhibition space, and offers artists a space to preserve their installations.

== Projects ==
=== Retrospectives of Lebanese sculptors ===
Each year, MACAM honours a Lebanese sculptor whose work has marked the country's art scene. In 2014, it exhibited a large selection of Zaven's work. He is renowned for his monumental bronze work, but also for his small bronze cast sculptures. Later the same year, it honoured Youssef Basbous who worked extensively on wood.

=== Yearly sculpture competition ===
In 2013, MACAM organised "The Age of Bronze" competition in which artists were invited to present a sculpture that the museum would cast in bronze, if they won the competition.

== Publications ==
=== Lebanese artists ===
- Rudy Rahme
- Jamil Molaeb

=== Lebanese art ===
- Nammour, C., Sculpture in Lebanon, Fine Arts Publishing, Beirut, 1990.
- Nammour, C., In Front of Painting, Fine Arts Publishing, Beirut, 2003.
- Khal, H., Resonances - 82 Lebanese Artists Reviewed, Fine Arts Publishing, Beirut, 2011.

=== Other publications ===
- Schaub, G., Cedrus Libani – The Cedar of Lebanon, Fine Arts Publishing, Beirut, 2012.

=== Brochures ===
- Beirut Art Book Fair (2009)
- Beirut Art Book Fair (2010)
- Beirut Art Book Fair (2011)
- Beirut Art Book Fair (2013)

=== Newsletter ===
- MACAM news, a monthly newsletter, which gives an account of the museum's activities.

== Visitor information ==
The museum is open every Friday, Saturday and Sunday, from 12 am to 6 pm.
