= Laure Ghorayeb =

Lebanese painter, poet, journalist and critic (1931–2023)

- Born: December 29, 1931; Deir al-Qamar, Lebanon
- Died: February 8, 2023 (aged 91)
- Occupations: writer and artist
- Children: 3, including Mazen Kerbaj

Laure Ghorayeb (Arabic: لور غريب; December 29, 1931 – February 8, 2023) was a Lebanese writer and artist. She was especially known for her intricate, monochrome drawings that often incorporated Arabic text.

== Biography ==
Laure Ghorayeb was born in Deir al-Qamar, Lebanon, in 1931. She first began drawing in 1940, while attending L'École des Sœurs de Saint Joseph de l'Apparition in her hometown. By 1945, she had moved with her family to Beirut, where she began writing poetry in French.

After publishing her first book of poems, Black… the Blues (1960), she was awarded a grant to travel to Paris for six months by the French Embassy in Lebanon. She went on to publish four books, including the short story collection A Crown of Thorns Around His Feet (1965).

While working as a researcher at the Lebanese Ministry of National Education and Fine Arts, in 1955, she began to pursue visual art seriously, working in charcoal and oils. She was self-trained as an artist.

Ghorayeb began exhibiting her work in 1966, with her first show, Noir et blanc, appearing at Yusuf and Helen al-Khal's Gallery One in Beirut. The following year, her drawing The Couple won a prize at the Biennale de Paris; that piece would later go missing during the Lebanese Civil War. She was heavily involved in the Beirut art scene throughout the 1960s and beyond. Over the course of her career, she continued to exhibit in both solo and group shows across the Arab world and in Europe, Asia, and Australia. She also participated in biennials in Baghdad and Alexandria, winning first prize at the latter in 1997. Her work is held in the collections of various institutions, including the British Museum, the Barjeel Art Foundation, and the Sursock Museum.

Later in life, Ghorayeb began collaborating on exhibitions and events with her son, the musician Mazen Kerbaj. The two jointly published a book, L’Abécédaire de Laure Ghorayeb et Mazen Kerbaj, in 2019. Another frequent collaborator was the Lebanese artist Huguette Caland.

Her 86 "Civil War Drawings" were collected in the 1985 book Témoignages. She later referenced this work in her series 33 Days, which dealt with the 2006 Lebanon War. Another monograph featuring her work was published in 2019.

Features of Ghorayeb's work included monochrome colors, detailed ink drawing, and the incorporation of Arabic text. She would sometimes marry her interests in poetry and art, illustrating her own collections.

In addition to producing her own art, she worked as a cultural critic. Publications she wrote for included Shi'r, L'Orient–Le Jour, and An-Nahar. She also translated poetry from Arabic into French.

From 1966 until her death, she was married to the actor Antoine Kerbage, with whom she had three children, including Mazen. She died in her early 90s in 2023.
