= Mazen Kerbaj =

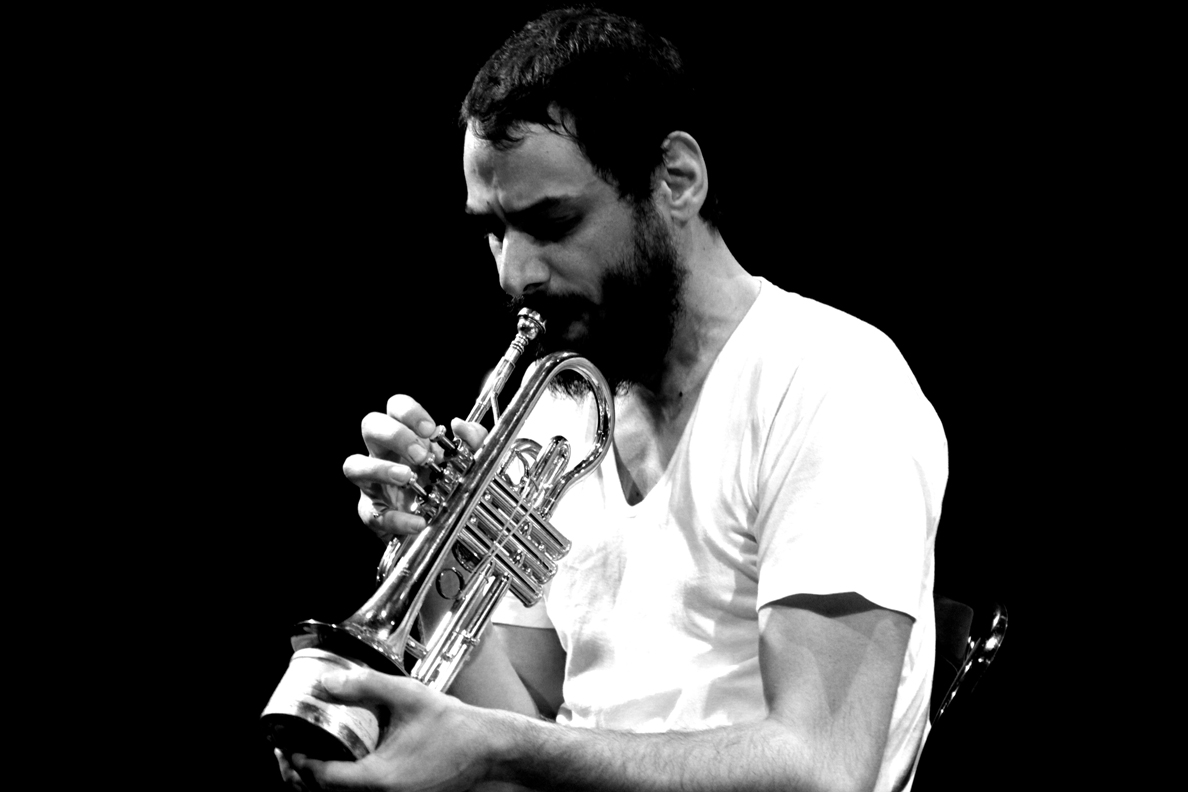
- Mazen Kerbaj, 2010

Background information
- Born: Mazen Kerbaj; 1975 (age 50–51)
- Origin: Beirut, Lebanon
- Website: https://mazenkerbaj.com/

Mazen Kerbaj (born Beirut, 1975) is a Lebanese jazz and free improvisation trumpeter and comic book artist.

== Early life ==
Kerbaj was born in Lebanon to artist and poet Laure Ghorayeb and actor Antoine Kerbaj. He grew up in Beirut during the Lebanese Civil War, and began playing free jazz in local clubs following the reestablishment of cultural life in the 1990s. From 1994 to 1999, Kerbaj studied graphic arts at the Lebanese Academy of Fine Arts (ALBA) in Beirut, completing a master's degree in 1999. He also received the Mounir Takchi Award that year.

== Career ==
Kerbaj's first public performances took place in 2000. He started his own record label, and toured internationally, playing with musicians such as Michael Zerang, Mats Gustafsson, Guillermo Gregorio, and Fred Lonberg-Holm in Europe and the United States.

He also issued his own comics in the 2000s, which are published on a blog. Kerbaj began producing comics in 1991 and subsequently published drawings and short works in Lebanese magazines, including L'Orient-Express, edited by Samir Kassir. In March 2000, he published Journal 1999, an autobiographical work in comics form. His later publications include Beyrouth, juillet–août 2006, a visual diary documenting the 2006 Lebanon War, which was published in English by Fantagraphics in 2017 as Beirut Won't Cry.

In July 2006, he recorded himself playing live during the 2006 Lebanon War with the sounds of bombs exploding and car sirens wailing.

In 2015, he was awarded a one-year residency through the DAAD. He subsequently settled in Berlin, where he continued his work in comics, visual arts and experimental music.

== Discography ==
- A with Sharif Sehnaoui & Raed Yassine cd-thèque (2003)
- Abu Tarek with Franz Hautzinger (Creative Sources, 2004)
- Rouba3i5 with Christine Sehnaoui, Sharif Sehnaoui & Ingar Zach (Al Maslakh, 2005)
- Brt Vrt Zrt Krt (Al Maslakh, 2005)
- 3:1 with Birgit Ulher, Sharif Sehnaou (Creative Sources, 2008)
- Blue Rain with Ernesto Rodrigues, Guilherme Rodrigues, Carlos Santos (Creative Sources, 2014)
- Ariha Brass Quartet with Axel Dörner, Franz Hautzinger, Carl Ludwig Hübsch (Al Maslakh, 2015)
- Funkhaus with Mike Bullock, Andrew Lafkas (Fine Noise & Light, 2017)
- East of Where? with Toshimaru Nakamura (Ftarri, 2017)
- Sawt Out with Burkhard Beins, Michael Vorfeld (2018)

== Bibliography ==
In English

- Gaza In My Phone, OR Books (2025), ISBN 978-1682196434
- Learning Deutsch, Headache Comics (2018)
- Beirut Won't Cry, Lebanon's July War: A Visual Diary, Fantagraphics (2017)

In French

- Politique, Actes Sud & Arte Editions (2019)
- L'Abécédaire with Laure Ghorayeb, Headache Comics (2014)
- Lettre à la mère, L'Apocalypse (2013)
- Un An: Journal d'une annee comme les autres, Headache Comics (2012)
- Suffit la bagarre! with Lenia Major, Samir Jeunesse (2012)
- Beyrouth, juillet–août 2006, Association (2007)
- 24 Poèmes, Headache Comics (2003)

== See also ==
- Laure Ghorayeb
- Cyril M
