= Tagreed Darghouth =

Tagreed Darghouth (born 1979) is a Lebanese artist.

She was born in Saida and studied painting and sculpting at the Lebanese Institute of Fine Arts in Beirut. She continued her studies at the Ayloul Summer Academy at Darat Al Funoun in Amman with Marwan Kassab Bachi and at the École nationale supérieure des arts décoratifs in Paris.

In her art, she deals with uncomfortable subjects such as the obsession of Lebanese young people with cosmetic surgery and the changes in Lebanese society brought on by an influx of imported female domestic help. Her work has appeared in solo and group exhibitions in Beirut, Dubai, Qatar, Amman, Istanbul, Buenos Aires, the United States and France.

Darghouth was awarded first prize by the Cité Internationale Universitaire de Paris at the cm3 competition in 2003.
