= Samir Abi Rashed =

Samir Abi Rashed (in Arabic سمير ابي راشد), born in Beirut in 1947, was a Lebanese painter. His work is representative of the influence of surrealism on middle eastern painters and expresses, with a careful and almost "photographic" technical execution, an erotic unconscious world of dreams and symbols. The artist passed away on November 29, 2021.
