= Omran Al-Kaysi =

Omran Al-Kaysi (born 1943) is an artist, historian and art critic. He currently writes for the daily Lebanese newspaper, Kifaharabi and is a correspondent to a newspaper in Saudi Arabia.

== Early life ==
Born to an Iraqi father and Lebanese mother, Kaysi studied law and art in Baghdad and Sofia, Bulgaria.

== Exhibitions ==
He has held both individual and group exhibitions across Lebanon, in Beirut, Saida and Kaslik, as well as abroad in Baghdad, Montreal, Amman, Madrid, London, Ontario, Jeddah and Riyadh. In 2002, Kaysi was one of the main organizers for the Khiam symposium in Southern Lebanon.

== Achievements ==
Kaysi has managed to display his paintings at Jeddah International Airport, another wall painting in Beiteddine Palace in Mount Lebanon, whilst another in Lebanon's Ministry of Education. Another two paintings of his are on display in Tehran's presidential palace, in addition to the other being in the Boston Museum of Modern Art.

== Publications ==
Kaysi is the author of several publications on modern Arabic art with themes of both love and war, these include:

- Abd-Elhalim Radwi and the Modern Saudi art
- A book about Aref Rayess
- "Close to home"
- "Sophism in Islamic art"

=== Published poems ===
- "Silence Does not Disturb the Dead", published in the early 60s.
- "Talking to trees that resemble men I used to know"
- "Verses not fit for publication" (a poem which criticizes the former ruling dictatorship of the Baath party in Iraq)
