= Farid Mansour (artist) =

Lebanese artist (1929–2010)

- فريد منصور
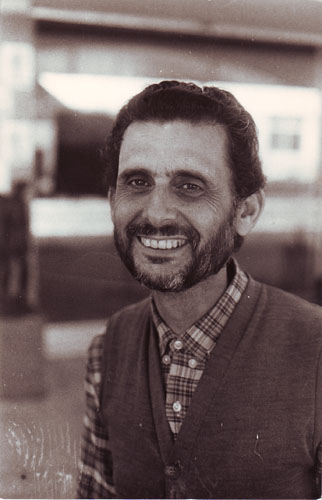
- Born: 1929; Beirut, Lebanon
- Died: 2010 (aged 80–81)
- Education: Lebanese Academy of Fine Arts; City and Guilds of London Art School
- Known for: Sculpting and Painting
- Website: faridmansour.com

Farid Mansour (1929–2010) (Arabic: فريد منصور) was a Lebanese sculptor and painter.

== Biography ==
Born In 1929 in Choueifat - Lebanon, Farid Mansour enrolled in the Lebanese Academy of Fine Arts (ALBA) in 1946, and was also mentored by the Italian artist Fernando Manetti between 1946 and 1949.

Seeking financial stability, Mansour migrated to Liberia for several years. He returned to his homeland in the mid-1950s to pursue his artistic career.

In 1961, Mansour invited and encouraged by Manetti himself, traveled to Italy specifically to Manetti's town of San Gimignano, where he continued his studies until 1963. In 1964 he joined the Ecole Universelle in Paris for one year, after which he returned to Lebanon again. In 1969, he traveled to London and enrolled in the City and Guilds of London Arts School, acquiring additional skills in sculpting and painting. During his stay in London, he had private tuition and was assigned his own working space in the Pharaonic and in the Greco-Roman department of the British Museum between the years 1974 and 1976.Towards the end of 1976 he worked as a sculptor in Madame Tussauds where he participated in the making of several statues.

In 1977, he was offered British citizenship, however he decided not to continue with the procedure, as he felt loyalty to his home country. He returned to his homeland to be a part of the drastic sociopolitical changes taking place.

He remained in Beirut, enduring the various phases of the Lebanese war, including the bombing and shelling. His artworks during and after the Lebanese war were greatly influenced by the tragic events, humanitarian issues and dilemmas resulting from armed conflicts. Since then many of his artworks embodied the need for change towards a better future, freedom and equality.

Mansour taught arts and painting at the Lebanese University and participated in various cultural events and exhibitions. He died in Beirut in 2010 at the age of 81, leaving behind an artistic heritage ranging between various painting schools from Classical to Modern to Abstract. He also left behind many sculptures of varying topics and techniques.

Farid Mansour appears in the Benezit Dictionary of Artists - Oxford Art Online, and in October 2018 a documentary about Mansour was broadcast in the series 5 De Pic - Farid Mansour on Tele Liban, the Lebanese Official TV Station

In addition to being an artist, Farid Mansour was also a caricaturist, a poet, a critic and a writer publishing in several Lebanese and Arab journals such as Alsafir, Alanwar, Alnidaa’, Alanbaa’, Alshiraa’, Alarabi, Alazmina Alarabiya, Alkhalijiya.

On June 14, 2019, a Tribute to Farid Mansour was organized in his town of Choueifat under the patronage of the Lebanese Ministry of Culture and was honored by Montada Insan, Lebanese Artists Association, Syndicate of the Lebanese Artists.

== Artistic Work Stages ==
Mansour mastered various painting and sculpting techniques. His artworks could be divided into four phases:

- 1950s to mid 1960s: Experimenting with various painting techniques influenced by the tutoring of Manetti himself. Nature, Still Life paintings, and portraits were the dominant subjects of his artworks during this period. It is clear from his paintings that he was experimenting with various techniques mainly oil.

- Mid 1960s to mid 1970s: During his stay in Europe, mainly in the UK, Mansour mastered oil painting. Most of his works influenced by 19th and 20th century British artists, focusing mainly on Genre-Painting, Portrait and Still life. During this period he also mastered various sculpting techniques, and worked many sculptures for the Madame Tussaud museum.

- 1977 - 1990s: During this period, the Lebanese war erupted. Mansour was greatly influenced and touched by the atrocities of the war. His works during this period mirrored violent events and its influence on people. This is clearly showing in his paintings where the intense emotions were reflected on the faces of his subjects as well as the overall scenery of war and destruction. During this phase there was a tendency to shift from oil to pastel and charcoal as well as water colors in his paintings. This was mainly due to the fact that oil paintings would take a substantially longer time to finish during a period of instability and continuous move to shelters avoiding heavy shelling. In addition to that he was forced to use whatever material and painting utensils available for him at that time. His sculptures also reflected dramatic events. It also embodied his longing towards an equal, free and prosperous society.

- Late 1990s - 2010: Following the end of the Lebanese war, Mansour was devastated by the civil war and the various foreign occupations of his country. He was in a state of despair and depression as his vision of society after the war was shattered into pieces. During this time he worked solely with Pastel, crayons and water colors. Famous for his pastel techniques, he leaned more towards Fauvism using ultra bright colors in his paintings, focusing mainly on nature and people working their land.

== Art works ==
"Moments before the hanging": One of his most striking sculptures, is an apt description for the aura of terror emanating from the man's face as feelings of dread and fear are combined with the realization of his fate as the noose tightens around his neck . It is believed that the piece has been lost/stolen during one of the various episodes of the Lebanese war.

Samira, Oil on Canvas 50x40 - 1983: features an 8-year-old child, who was forced by her parents to work as a housekeeper at a neighbour of the artist to earn money for the family. Farid, touched by this incident decided to pay tribute to Samira with a portrait. The subject is shown with a defiant pose, framed showing head and shoulders and facing directly towards the viewer.

Adib - Water Color 15x20cm -1979: Adib a university Student in Beirut, the moment a bomb hit campus, and injured some of his classmates. Mansour reflected the intense shocking emotions on the student's face.

== Exhibitions ==
Farid Mansour participated in many solo exhibitions:

- 1962 – West Hall, American University of Beirut
- 1967 – Soviet Cultural Center – Beirut
- 1980 – Choueifat Municipality Hall – Choueifat, Lebanon
- 1980 – Ras El Matn – Ras El Matn, Lebanon
- 1980 – Soviet Union Graduates Alumni - Ministry of Tourism, the Glass Hall
- 1988 – Soviet Cultural Center – Beirut
- 2006 – Lebanese Artists Association with artists Adnan Al Masri and Moufid Zeitouni

He also participated in many national exhibitions since the year 1959:

- Sursok Museum - Beirut
- UNESCO Hall - Beirut
- Ministry of Tourism - Beirut
- Beit El Din Castle - Beit El Din
- Lebanese university - Beirut
- Soviet Cultural Center - Beirut

On the international level, he continuously participated in exhibitions such as :

- 1971 - 1976 Mall Galleries in London
- 1983 – Al Turath Gallery, New York
- 1987 - Institut du Monde Arabe, Paris
- 1988 – National Museum, Damascus
- 1989 – Barbican Center, London
