= Derrie Fakhoury =

Lebanese painter

Derrie Fakhouri
- Born: 1930; Beirut, Lebanon
- Died: 2015 (aged 84–85); Amman, Jordan
- Education: Accademia di belle arti di Roma; Fine Arts Academy in Beirut
- Known for: Painting and medals

Derrie Fakhoury (1930–2015) was a Lebanese artist.

== Life ==
Fakhoury was born in Beirut in 1930, and studied painting at the Fine Arts Academy in Beirut. She traveled to Italy to continue her studies in art at the Accademia di belle arti di Roma. Then she joined the Institute of Medal Art of Rome and she excelled in this area. Inspired by her visits to churches and museums in Italy, she studied the art of wall painting (Fresco) at the Decorative Arts Institute and became proficient in this art. After returning from Italy, She lived with her husband, the late famous Syrian painter and plastic artist Mahmoud Hammad in Damascus and produced works in various aspects of art with clear talent. Her work recorded themes inspired by the rural environment characterized by transparent colors and sincere impressionism.
