= Lidya Tchakerian =

Lebanese artist

Lidya Aaghia Tchakerian
- Born: 1959 (age 66–67); Beirut
- Education: Lebanese Academy of Fine Arts
- Known for: Oil painting
- Website: "Lidyaart"

Lidya Tchakerian (born 1959) is a Lebanese artist. Since 2002, she has been living in the US.

== Life ==
Tchakerian was born in Beirut in 1959 and she has an Armenian Lebanese background. She obtained her master's degree in her home town at the Lebanese Academy of Fine Arts and then lectured at the same university starting in 1989.

From 1996 to 1997, she received a French cultural scholarship.

She emigrated to the US in 2002.

Her large expressionist oil paintings explore the "conflicts of existence, history of war and culture, conscious and subconscious feelings of humanity"

Her studio is in Santa Clarita in Los Angeles County, California.

== Exhibitions ==
Exhibitions include:

- 1992, Salon D'automne International Exhibition, Paris
- 2003, California
- 2004, Florida, Texas, California
- 2005, China, New York
- 2006, France, Germany
- 2009, France
- 2010, Rhode Island

Tchakerian has exhibited in China, America, Europe and Lebanon. She also exhibited work to commemorate the 100th anniversary of the Armenian genocide.
