= Rudy Rahme =

Lebanese sculptor and painter

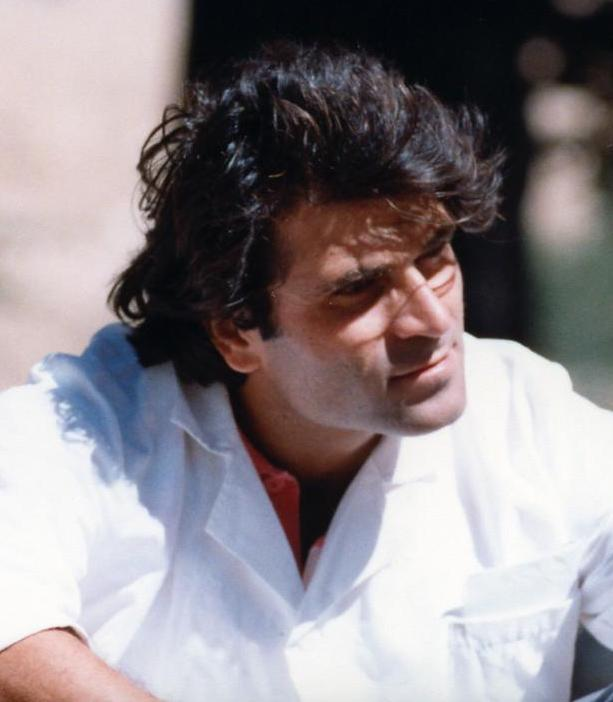
- Born: 1967 (age 58–59); Bsharri
- Education: Lebanese Academy of Fine Arts, Academia Spinelli - Florence, Fonderie Coubertin - Paris
- Notable work: Lamartine Cedar, Jibran Khalil Jibran statue, Said Akl bust
- Website: rudyrahme.com

Rudy Rahme (born October 1967) is a Lebanese sculptor, painter and poet.

== Education ==
He was born in October 1967 in Bsharri, Lebanon, and attended Collège Saint Joseph – Antoura in Keserwan District and then the Lebanese Academy of Fine Arts. He then specialized in fresco and sculpture at the Academia Spinelli in Florence and later he studied at the Fonderie Coubertin in Paris.

== Work ==
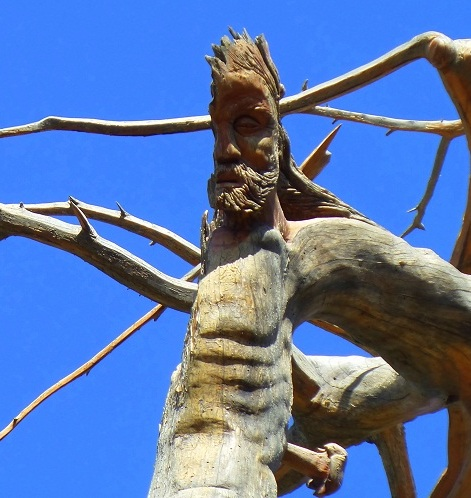
La Martine Tree, Cedars of God.

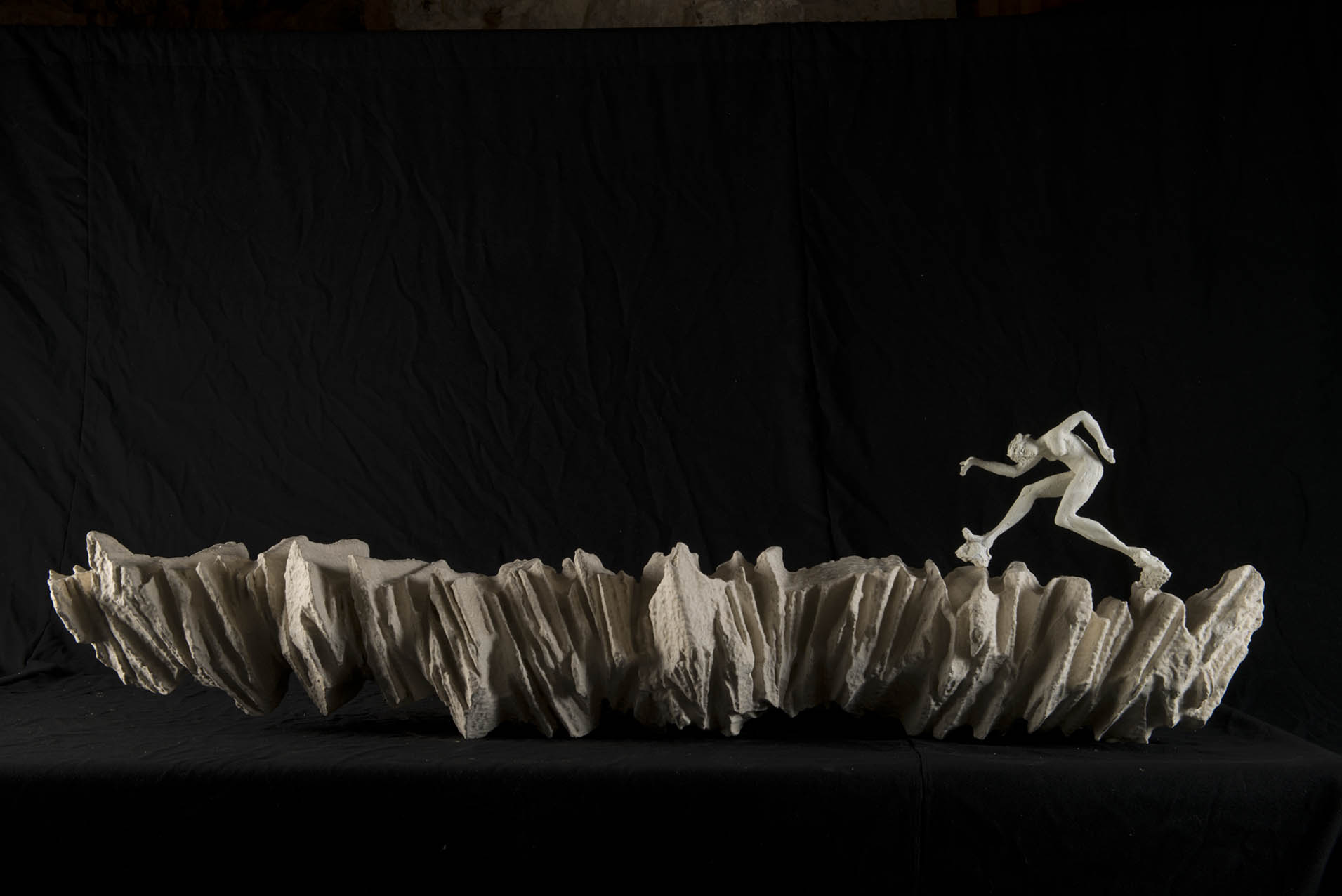
The Walking Rock infinity.

- He has finished building parts of the Maria Goretti Chapel in Miziara, Lebanon in memory of Raya Chidiac.
- The Walking Rock infinity
- The Dream
- Jibran Khalil Jibran bust
- Lamartine square
- The Walking Rock Series
- The Balance Series
- The Dancing Series
- The Religious Series
- The Bust Series
- Al Tajalli
- Gebran k Gebran
- Said Akl
- The Last Supper
- The Raft

== Exhibitions ==
- 2020 - Australia - Sydney - "Rejuvenate" AAD Gallery
- 2019 - Lebanon - Beirut - The Garden Show 16th
- 2018 - Lebanon - Beirut - Artspace Hamra
- 2017 - UAE - Abu Dhabi - Le Royal Meridien
- 2016 - Italy - Imperia - the International photo exhibition of Contemporary Art
- 2016 - UK - London - Monteoliveto Gallery : Cities of Europe /London Calling
- 2016 - Belgium - Bruxelles - Salon international d'art contemporain
- 2016 - France - Paris - Light and Transparencies - Galerie Etienne de Causans
- 2015 - US - Miami - Miami River Art Fair 2015
- 2015 - Singapore - Singapore - WTECA
- 2012 - Lebanon - Beirut - Tawazon Robert Mouawad Private Museum
- 2011 - Lebanon - Beirut - The Garden Show
