= Zena Assi =

Contemporary Lebanese painter

Zena Assi (born 1974) is a Lebanese artist. Her work focuses on themes such as political unrest in Lebanon, the emotional effects of migration, and her experience of urban life. Zena was born in Lebanon, and moved to the UK in 2014.

== Works ==
Kaelen Wilson-Goldie writes, in a newspaper article for The National:

Assi’s roughly chiselled portraits of rakish figures –lanky young men sucking down coffee and cigarettes, despondent young women sinking stubborn chins into thin, bony hands –jostled for attention alongside her paintings of dystonic cityscapes cluttered with electrical wires, television antennae and buildings stacked precariously on top of one another ... She never makes preparatory sketches and begins instead by priming her canvases directly. She creates base layers with acrylic paints and then starts adding different textures, using paper, cloth, broken brushes, whatever she finds in her studio to suit her mood.

— Kaelen Wilson-Goldie, Brushing up

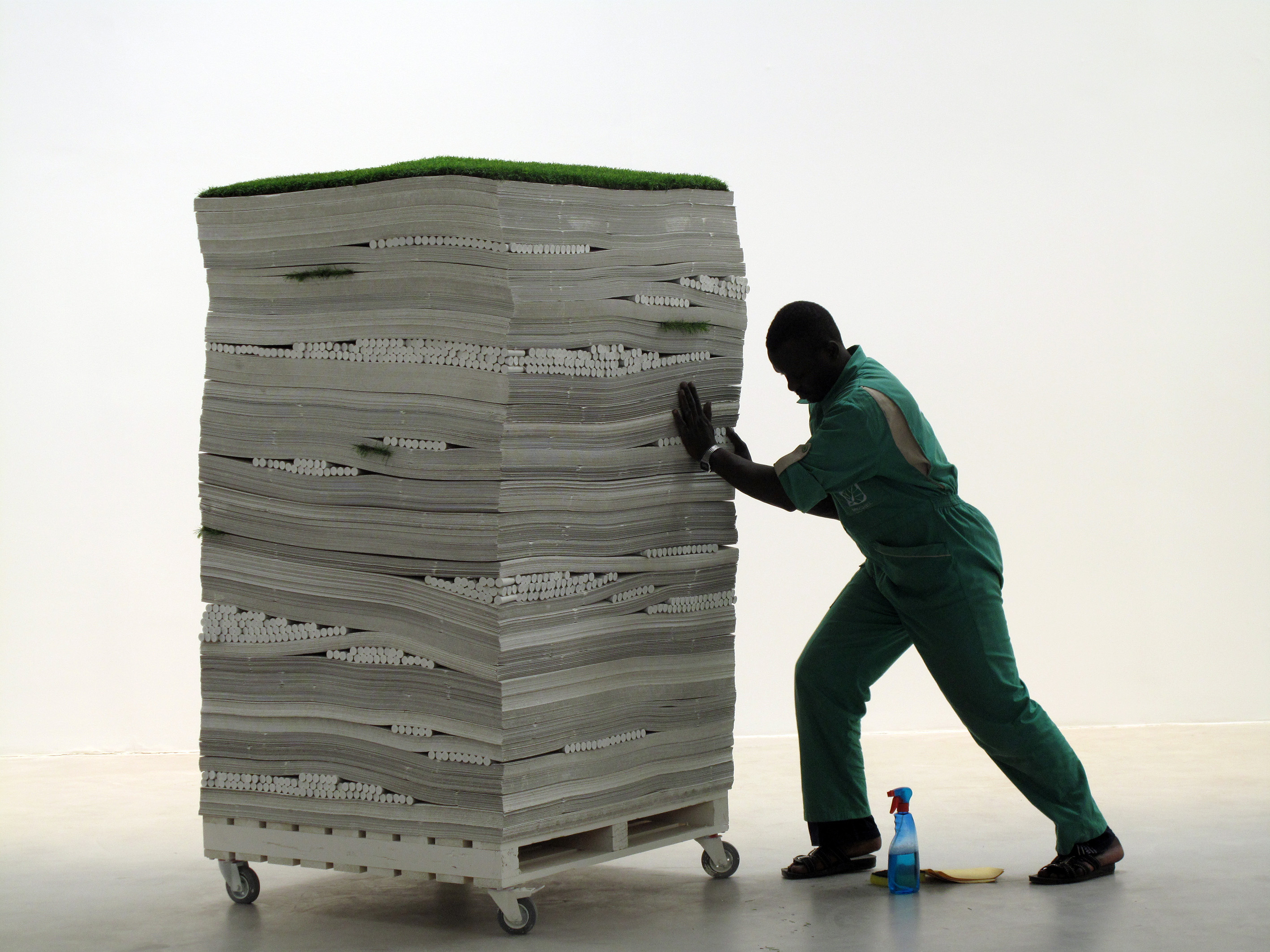
Title: 'Beirut 1X1'- Cardboards, bullets, wheels, wood and paint- Year 2011

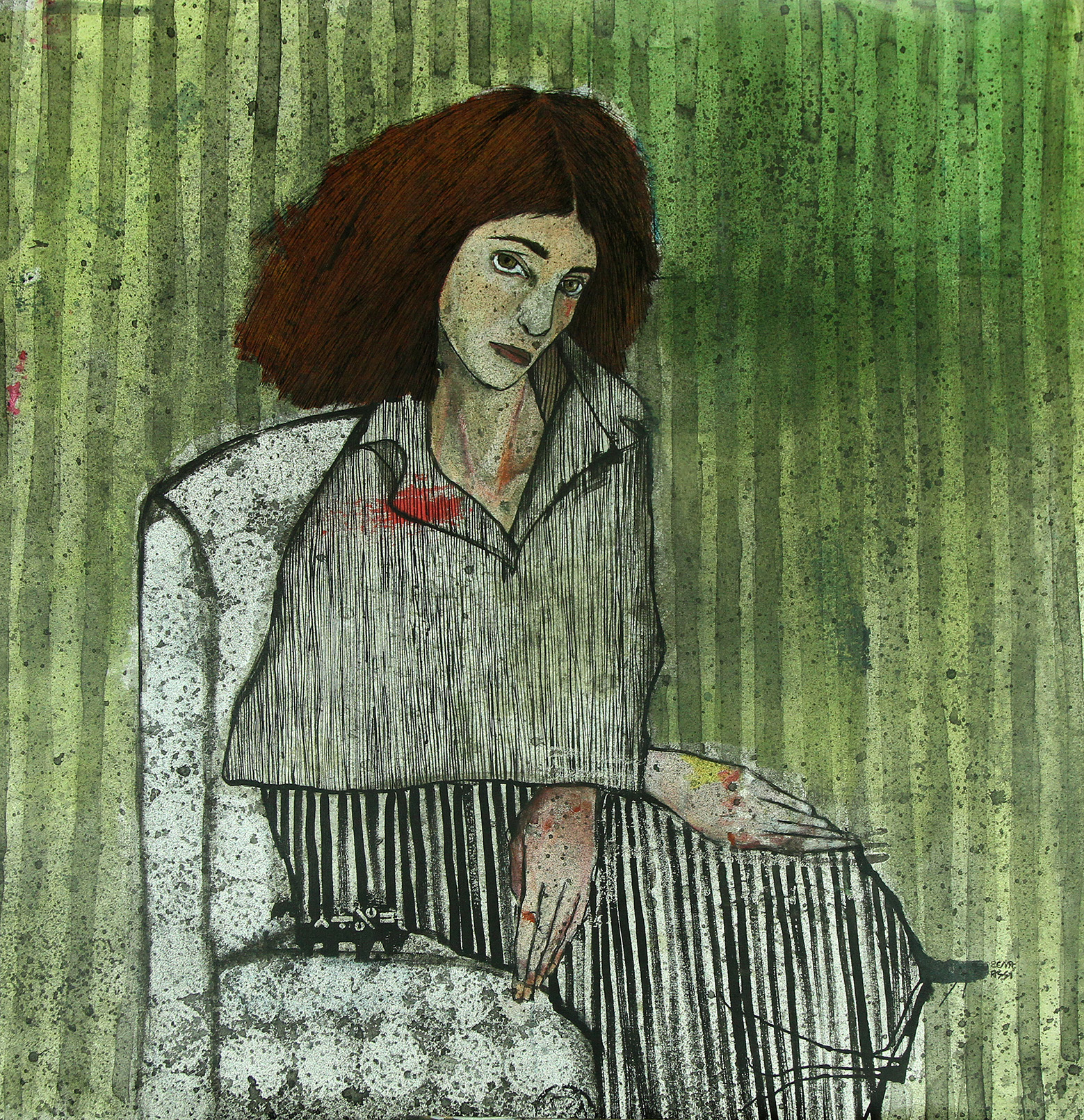
Title: 'Portrait in April'- Mixed media on canvas- Year 2015

=== City wall ===
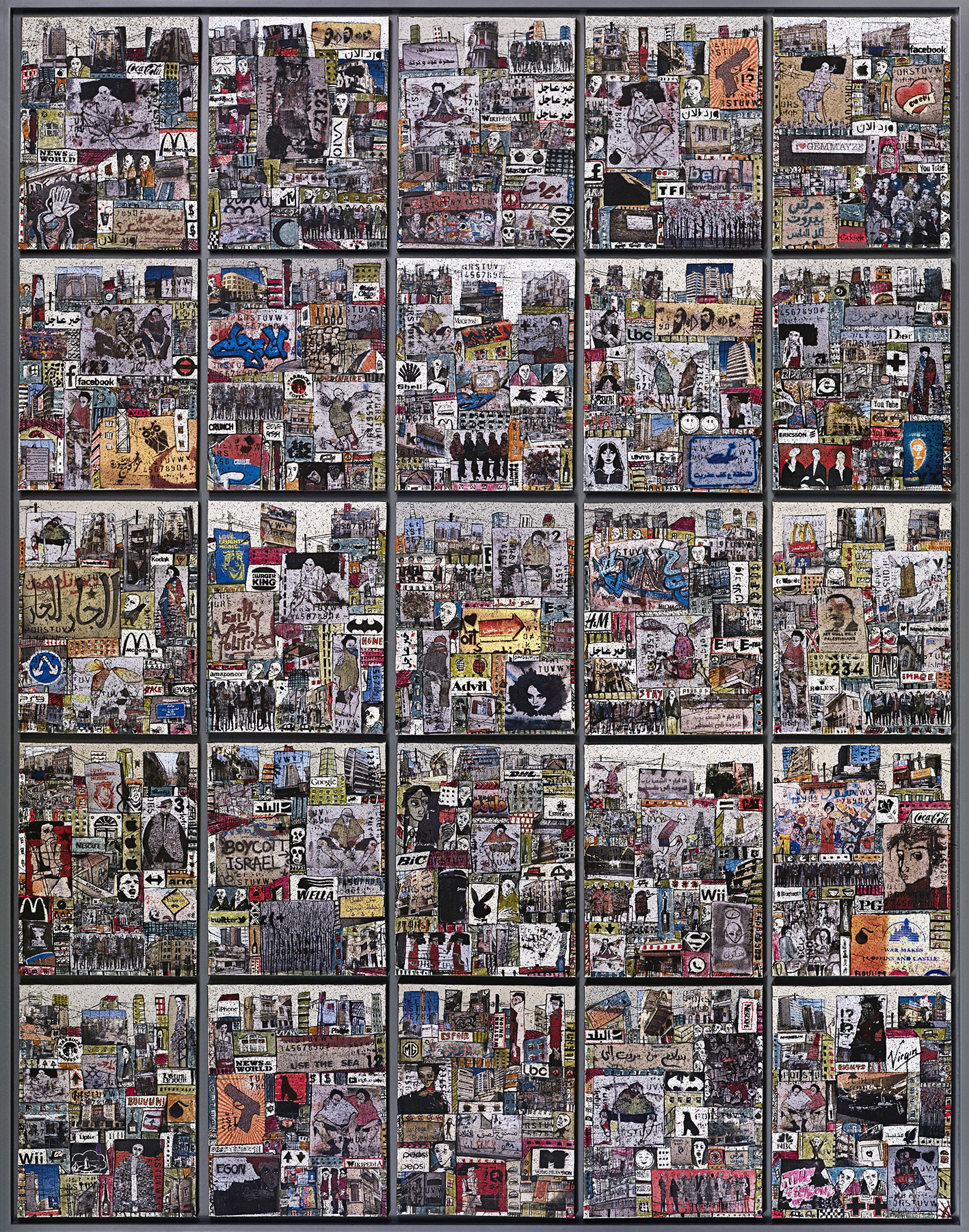
'My City framed in colors'- Mixed media and paper collage on canvas, 2014

Assi describes the work as follows:

My city is treated as a fabric, a kaleidoscope of symbols; the Calligraphy becomes graffiti on walls, the urban tissue becomes an embroidered panel; the landscape becomes the weaving of a textile treated with my portraits as miniatures and decorative illuminations.

— Zena Assi, Artist biography

The work is inspired by Egon Schiele. It explores themes including "war, peace, silence, hope and individual frustration".
