= Dyala Khodary =

Lebanese painter

Dyala Khodary (Arabic: ديالا خضري; born 1979) is a Lebanese contemporary painter based in Beirut. Her work explores the city's people, architecture, infrastructure, and urban landscape through paintings depicting portraits, façades, tiled floors, manhole covers, electrical cables, and other elements of Beirut's environment.

== Education and early career ==
Khodary graduated from the Lebanese University in 2002 with a degree in Plastic Arts.

Following her studies, she worked in decorative painting. She has described this experience as influential in developing her approach to texture, material behavior, craftsmanship, and painted surfaces, elements that later became defining characteristics of her artistic practice.

== Career ==
Before her first solo exhibition, Khodary participated in collective exhibitions, including three editions of the Salon d'Automne organized by Beirut's Sursock Museum.

=== Tailor-Made ===
Khodary's first solo exhibition, Tailor-Made, was held in 2015 in Beirut at Art on 56th, the gallery that has represented her since. The exhibition presented portraits drawn from the artist's local surroundings, combining figurative painting with techniques influenced by her background in decorative painting, including patterns, collage, and layered surfaces.

=== Beirut in Patterns ===
Her second solo exhibition, Beirut in Patterns, opened in 2018 and marked a shift toward making Beirut's architecture the central subject of her work. Rather than depicting panoramic city views, the exhibition focused on architectural fragments such as balconies, façades, tiled floors, and abandoned buildings.

Critics read the exhibition as a reflection on the disappearance of Beirut's historic architecture and the transformation of the city's urban identity. L'Orient-Le Jour described Beirut as the central subject of the series, while Annahar, Al-Akhbar, and Al Araby Al Jadeed emphasized architectural memory and the contrast between traditional and contemporary urban development.

=== Le Corbeau et le Regard ===
In 2023, Khodary presented Le Corbeau et le Regard: Beyrouth en Motifs II (Corbels and Manholes: Beirut in Patterns II), a continuation of her investigation of Beirut's visual identity. The exhibition expanded her architectural vocabulary to include corbels, rooftops, staircases, pavements, drainage systems, and manhole covers. Around the same period, she also developed the Portals series, in which manhole covers became symbolic entrances to hidden layers of the city.

Critics discussed the exhibition's relationship between realism and abstraction, as well as its use of overlooked urban details. Al Modon highlighted its elevated viewpoints and absence of human figures, while Al Mayadeen interpreted ordinary architectural objects as central components of Khodary's visual language.

=== Off the Grid / اشتراك ===
Khodary's fourth solo exhibition, Off the Grid / اشتراك, was presented in 2026. The exhibition focused on Lebanon's electricity crisis and the dense networks of electrical cables associated with privately operated neighborhood generators. Rather than functioning only as documentary representations, the cables became layered visual systems that moved between observation and abstraction. In some works, the cables remained recognizable as parts of the urban landscape. In others, they became lines, knots, grids, and overlapping forms that could be read independently of their original function.

L'Orient-Le Jour's coverage emphasized that the exhibition did not simply document infrastructural failure. Instead, Khodary transformed temporary and improvised electrical arrangements into a visual language through which the city could be interpreted.

== Artistic practice ==
Architecture and infrastructure are central subjects throughout Khodary's work. Beginning with recognizable elements of Beirut, she reorganizes buildings, pavements, electrical systems, and urban surfaces through repetition, cropping, patterning, shifts in scale, and unusual viewpoints.

Her background in decorative painting is reflected in her attention to textured, weathered, and repaired surfaces. She primarily uses acrylic paint, while also working with oil paint and epoxy resin. Her choice of supports ranges from canvas and paper to wood and oxidized metal.

Selected collective exhibitions

- MENART Fair, Palais d'Iéna, Paris, France, 2023
- Art Cairo, Grand Egyptian Museum, Cairo, Egypt, 2023
- MENART Fair, Bonhams Cornette de Saint Cyr, Paris, France, 2022
- Egypt International Art Fair, Dusit Thani Lake View, Cairo, Egypt, 2022
- Regards D'Orient Modern and Contemporary Art from MENA (auction), Bonhams Cornette de Saint Cyr, Paris, France, 2021
- Beirut Art Fair, Beirut, Lebanon, 2019
- Break All Frames: Women Diversity in Art, Beit Beirut, Beirut, Lebanon, 2018
- Bitasarrof: Le Livre Revisité, The National Library of Beirut, Beirut, Lebanon, 2016
- Art 15, London's Global Art Fair, London, UK, 2015

Selected paintings

- Warm Intervention, 2024
- Hemostasis, 2023
- Daughter of the Nile: The Other Half of the Nation, 2022
- Abyss, 2022
- Urban Oasis, 2021
- Limbo, 2020
- Ring Plaza, 2019
- Un-trash, 2016
