= Nadim Karam =

Lebanese artist

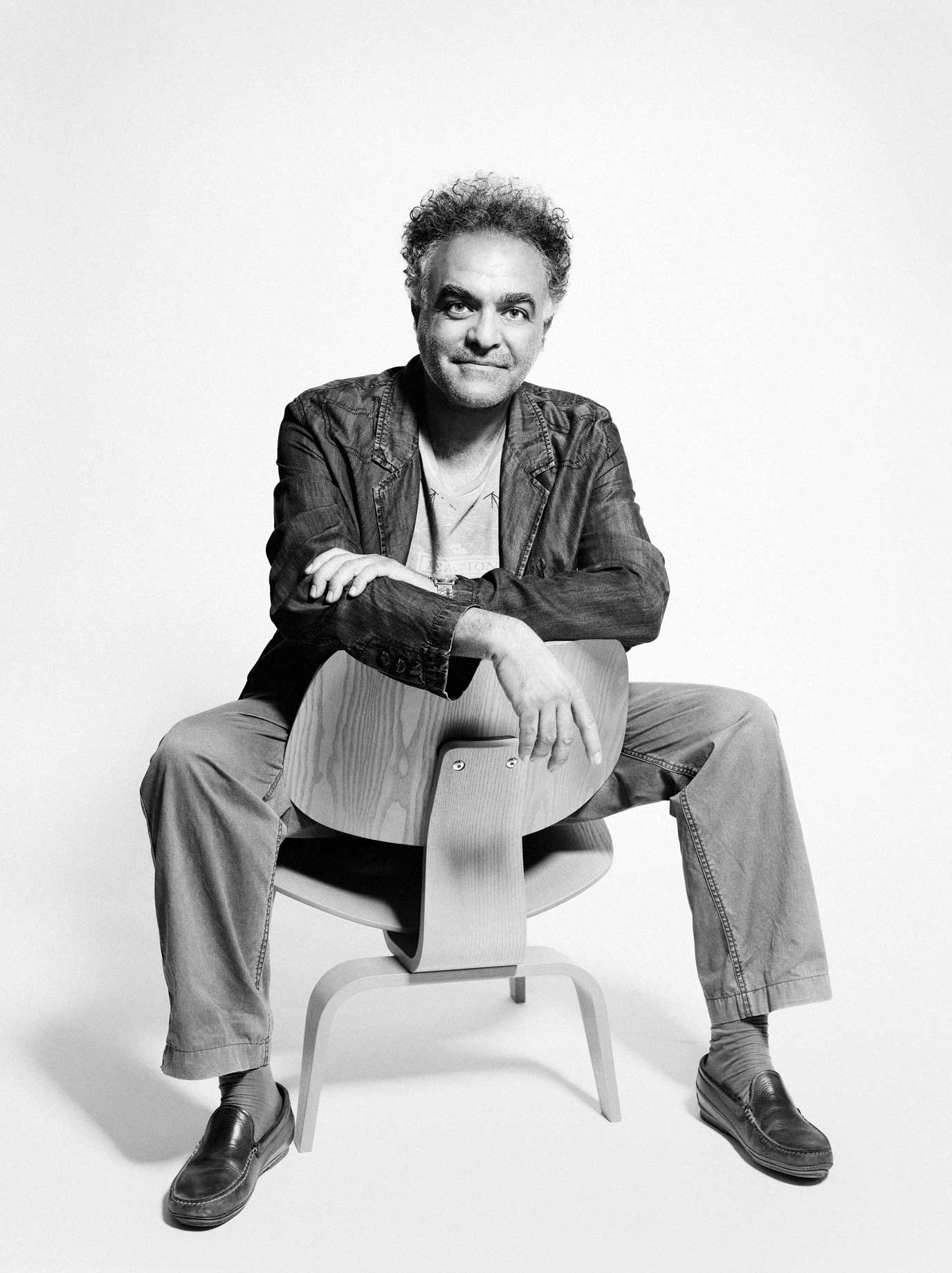
- Nadim Karam 2012
- Born: 1957 (age 68–69); Kaolack, Senegal
- Occupation: Architect
- Practice: Atelier Hapsitus Nadim Karam

Nadim Karam (Arabic: نديم كرم); (born 1957) is a multidisciplinary Lebanese artist and architect who fuses his artistic output with his background in architecture to create large-scale urban art projects in different cities of the world. He uses his vocabulary of forms in urban settings to narrate stories and evoke collective memory with a very particular whimsical, often absurdist approach; seeking to 'create moments of dreams' in different cities of the world.

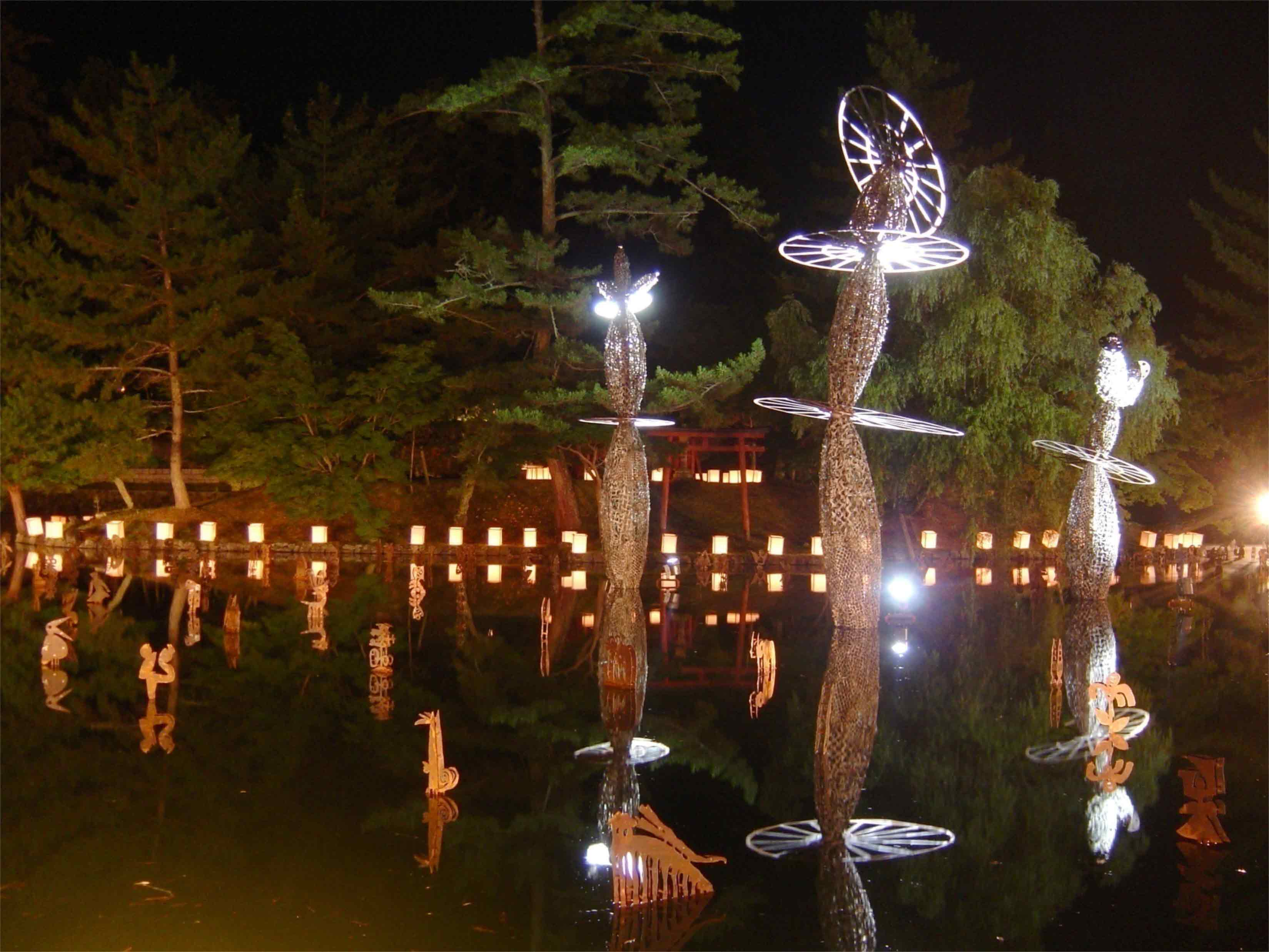
The Three Flowers of Jitchu, Nara, Nadim Karam & Atelier Hapsitus

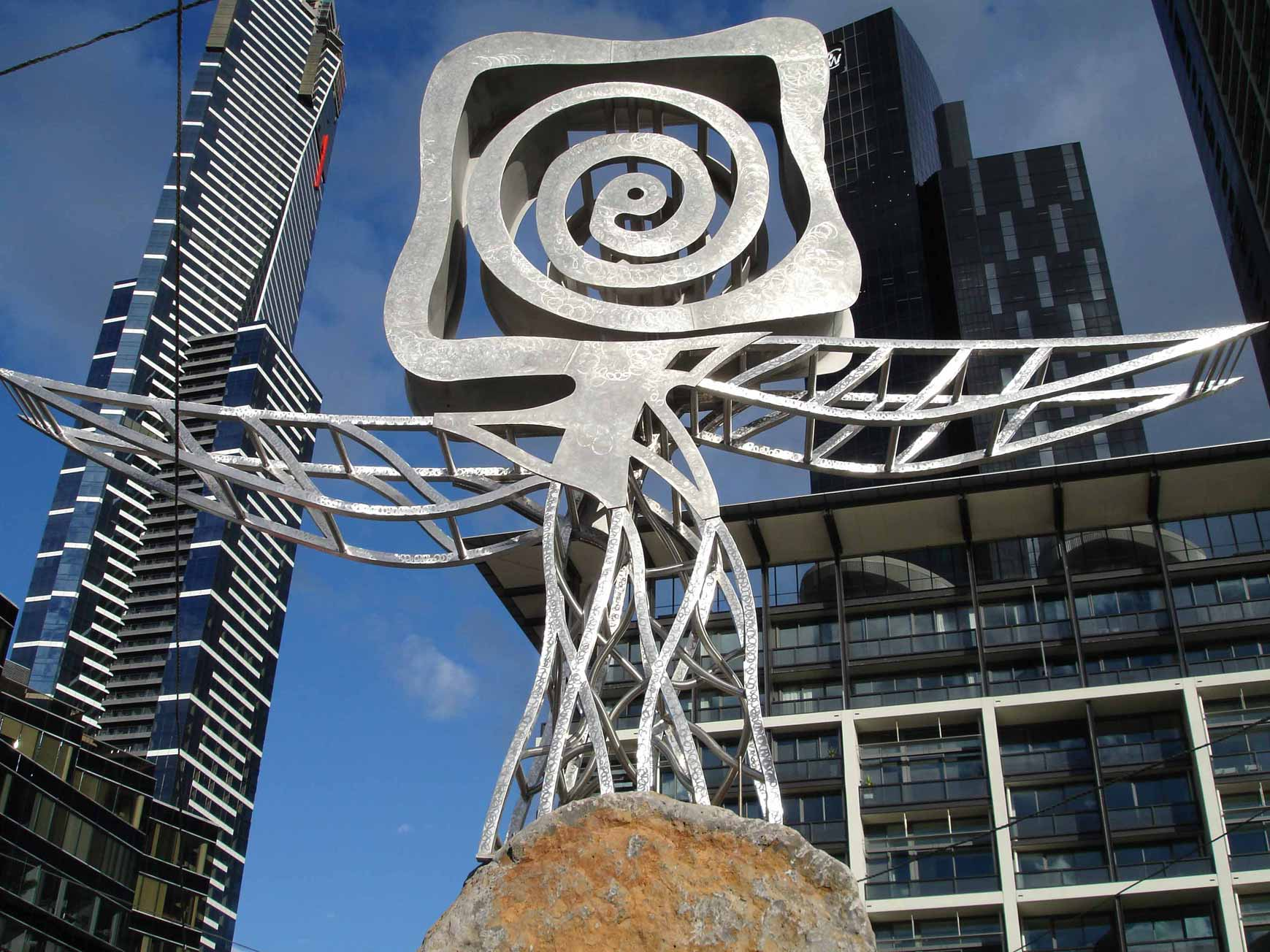
The Travelers, Melbourne, Nadim Karam & Atelier Hapsitus

== Early life and education ==
Nadim Karam grew up in Beirut. He received a Bachelor of Architecture from the American University of Beirut in 1982, at the height of the Lebanese civil war, and left the same year to study in Japan on a Monbusho scholarship. At the University of Tokyo he developed an interest in Japanese philosophy of space, which he studied under Hiroshi Hara, and was also taught by Fumihiko Maki and Tadao Ando. He created several solo art performances and exhibitions in Tokyo while completing master and doctorate degrees in architecture.

== Teaching ==
Nadim Karam taught at the Shibaura Institute of Technology in Tokyo in 1992 with Riichi Miyake and then returned to Beirut to create his experimental group, Atelier Hapsitus. The name, derived from the combination of Hap (happenings) and Situs (situations), comes from Karam's enjoyment of the fact that the encounter of these two factors often gives rise to the unexpected. He taught architectural design at the American University of Beirut (1993–5, 2003–4), and was Dean of the Faculty of Architecture, Art and Design at Notre Dame University in Lebanon from 2000 to 2003. He co-chaired in 2002 the UN/New York University conference in London for the reconstruction of Kabul and was selected as the curator for Lebanon by the first Rotterdam Biennale. From 2006 to 2007 he served on the Moutamarat Design Board for Dubai and regularly gives lectures at universities and conferences worldwide.

== Urban art projects ==
With Atelier Hapsitus, the pluri-disciplinary company he founded in Beirut, he created large-scale urban art projects in different cities including Beirut, Prague, London, Tokyo, Nara and Melbourne. His project for Prague's Manes Bridge in the spring of 1997 was both a commemoration of the city's post-communist liberalization and an echo of its history, with the placement of his works in parallel to the baroque sculptures on the Charles Bridge. The post-civil war 1997–2000 itinerant urban art project he created for central Beirut was one of five worldwide selected by the Van Alen Institute in New York in 2002 to highlight the role they played in the rejuvenation of city life and morale after a disaster. In Japan, 'The Three flowers of Jitchu' realized at Tōdai-ji Temple in Nara in 2004, was a temporary installation commemorating the achievements of a Middle Eastern monk, Jitchu, whose performance is still enacted yearly since the year 752 in the temple he designed for it. Karam's project took 20 years to gain acceptance from the Tōdai-ji Temple authorities. His 2006 Victoria State commission The Travellers a permanent art installation of ten sculptures which travel across Melbourne's Sandridge Bridge three times daily, tells the story of Australian immigrants and creates an urban clock in the city.

=== Selected public art installations ===
- 2020 On Parade: Desert X, AlUla
- 2020 Politics of Dialogue: The Merry-Go-Round, United World College Maastricht, Maastricht, the Netherlands
- 2017 Trio Elephants-Lovers’ Park, Yerevan, Armenia
- 2017 Wheels of Innovation-Nissan Headquarters, Tokyo, Japan
- 2016 Stretching Thoughts: Shepherd and Thinker- UWC Atlantic College, Wales, UK
- 2014 Wishing Flower- Zaha Hadid's D’Leedon residential project, Leedon Heights, Singapore

== Architectural work ==
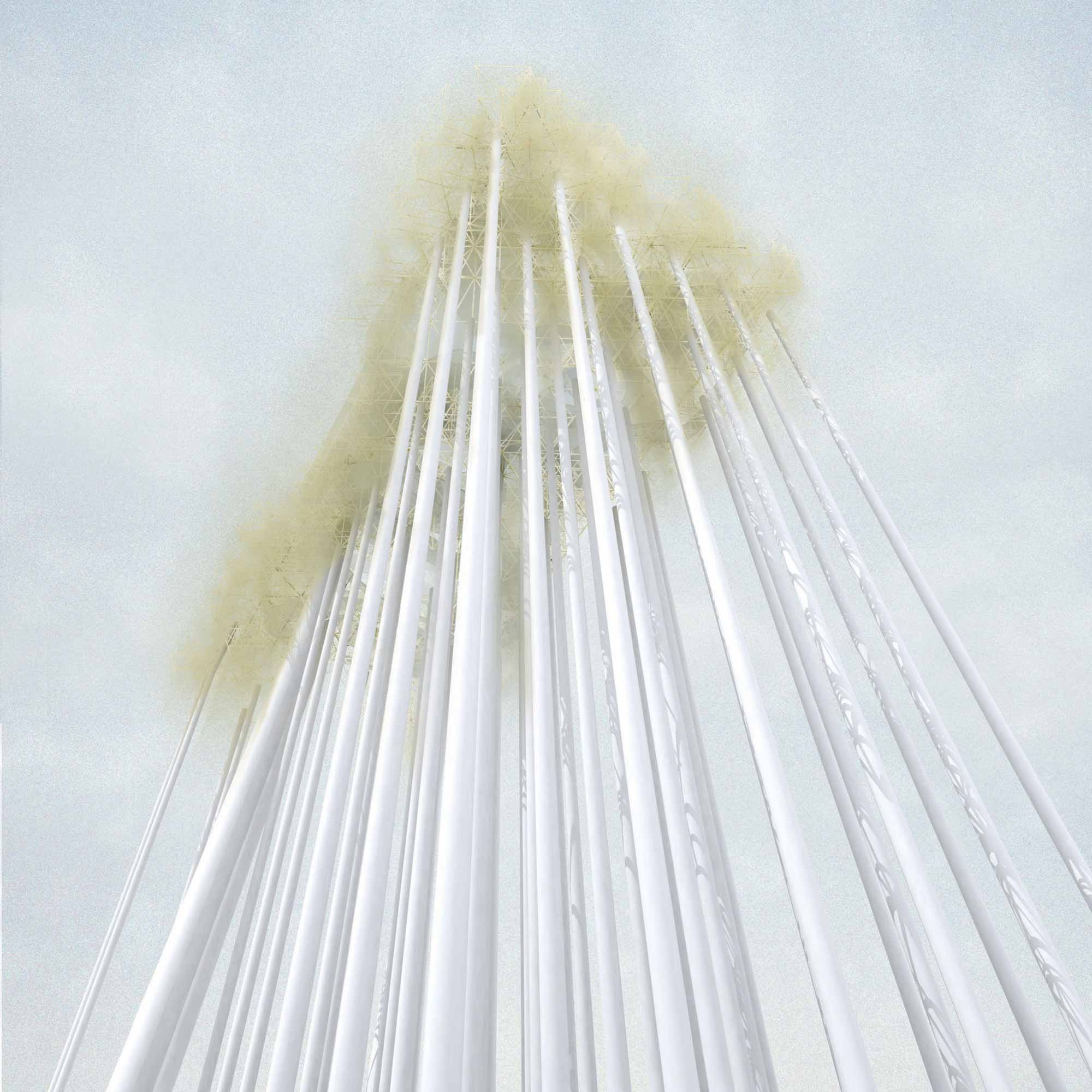
Cloud Project by Nadim Karam & Atelier Hapsitus

Nadim Karam is mainly known for his conceptual work, like 'Hilarious Beirut', the 1993 post-war anti-establishment project for the reconstruction of Beirut city centre, and 'The Cloud', a huge public garden resembling a raincloud that stands at 250 m above ground. Inspired by the city of Dubai, it proposes a visual and social alternative to the exclusivity of the skyscrapers in Gulf cities. Karam's signature un-built projects include the 'Net Bridge' a pedestrian bridge conceived as a gateway to Beirut city centre from the marina, with five lanes that playfully intersect and interweave. Similarly, his winning design of a competition for the BLC Bank headquarters for Beirut features the new headquarters straddling the old. Karam collaborates closely with Arup Engineers in London, who give structural and technical reality to his most unusual ideas.

== Ongoing projects ==
The Dialogue of the Hills is an urban art project conceived to invigorate the historic core of Amman through a series of public gardens and sculpture for each hill community. The sculptures are designed to create a dialogue with the others on the surrounding hills of the city, physically and visually linking diverse socio-economic communities. The Wheels of Chicago is a project inspired by the city where the Ferris wheel was invented.

== Art works ==
=== Selected solo exhibitions ===
- 2017: “Urban Stories” — Fine Art Society, London, UK
- 2016: “Shhhhhhh…shout!” — Art Dubai, Dubai, UAE
- “Stretching Thoughts” — Ayyam Gallery, Beirut, Lebanon
- 2013: “99 Objects possible to find on a Cloud”, — Ayyam Gallery Dubai (AlQuoz), September – November *2013
- 2013: “Urban Zoo” — Ayyam Gallery Beirut, August–October 2013
- 2013: “Shooting the Cloud” — Ayyam Gallery London, January 2013
- 2013 & 2011: Menasart, Beirut International Exhibition, BIEL
- 2010: The Wild Cat and other sculptures, DIFC Gate, Dubai
- 2008: The Fisherman fishing from a Cloud, installation, Creek Art Fair, Bastakiya, Dubai
- 2008: Clouds & Chairs, Sultan Gallery, Kuwait
- 2002: 101 archaic procession elements, rooftop installation in Leeds, UK
- 2001: London & Dublin project, exhibition, Unesco, Beirut
- 2001: Solfeggio 101, exhibition, Portside Gallery, Yokohama, Japan
- 1999: The Giraffe, the Wild Cat & the apparently Digested Objects, British Council, Beirut
- 1998: Hilarious Beirut, exhibition, Order of Engineers & Architects/Beirut, Venice Institute of Architecture/Venice, Technische Universität Berlin
- 1997: Bartlett School of Architecture/London
- 1997: T-Races PCB-137, exhibition, Manes Gallery/Prague, Fragnera Gallery/Prague
- 1996: Bartlett School of Architecture/London
- 1996: Arhus University/Denmark
- 1995: Galleri ROM, Oslo / French Cultural Centre, Beirut
- 1992: Spinning Caves, exhibition, Formes Gallery, Tokyo &Kikukawa Gallery, Oita
- 1991: The Carrier, exhibition, Marunouchi Gallery, Tokyo
- 1990: Temple of the Obelisks, installation & performance, Sagacho Exhibit Space, Tokyo/ Intercrossings, IMA project exhibition & performance, French-Japanese Institute of Tokyo
- 1987: Architectural Crisis, performance, Cealacanth House, Osaka / Celebration of Life: The Funeral, performance & exhibition, Spiral Garden, Tokyo
- 1986: Micropluralism, exhibition, Striped House Museum of Art, Tokyo / Family Crisis, performance, Yamagata

=== Selected group exhibitions ===
- 2016: Art Dubai — Dubai, UAE*
- 2015: Art Abu Dhabi- Abu Dhabi, UAE*
- Art Dubai — Dubai, UAE*
- 2014: JISP Biennale 2014- Jing An Sculpture Park, Shanghai, China
- Art Dubai — Dubai, UAE**
- 2013: Art Dubai — Dubai, UAE*
- 2013: 'Closets & Closets' series and ‘Trio Elephants’, as part of the “25 years of Arab Creativity” exhibition at Abu Dhabi Festival 2013, Art Abu Dhabi and the Institut du Monde Arabe (IMA), Paris, 2012
- 2012: The Cloud, The Fisherman & The Mutating Cities, Villa Empain Exhibition, Brussels
- 2012: “Subtitled: WITH NARRATIVES FROM LEBANON”, at the Royal College of Art, London as part of the Association for the Promotion and Exhibition of the Arts in Lebanon (APEAL)
- 2011: Chatsworth Beyond Limits at the Sotheby's, London
- 2010: Convergence, American University Museum, Katzen Arts Centre, Washington / Contemporabia, Beirut, March
- 2009: Stories from the Levant, Ayyam Dubai / Nadim Karam & Safwan Dahoul, Ayyam Beirut
- 2006: Liverpool Independent Art Biennale
- 2003: Exhibition, Renewing, Rebuilding, Remembering, The Lighthouse, Glasgow, Scotland, Van Alen Institute, New York, 2002.
- 1996: Venice Biennale of Architecture, South Korean Pavilion
- 1996: Erotisches Museum Berlin, Aedes Gallery, Berlin
- 1995: Kwangju Biennale of Art, Korea

== Awards ==
- 10th FEA Distinguished Alumnus Award
- ASI steel Award 2008
- Urban Design Award 2006
- Melbourne Prize 2007

== Publications ==
- 2013 : ‘Stretching Thoughts’, Booth-Clibborn Editions, London
- 2007: ‘The Cloud, the Desert and the Arabian Breeze’, Booth-Clibborn Editions, London
- 2006: ‘Urban Toys’, Booth-Clibborn Editions, London, with introduction by Paul Virilio
- 2000: VOYAGE, Booth-Clibborn Editions, London
