= Samir Sammoun =

Canadian-Lebanese artist

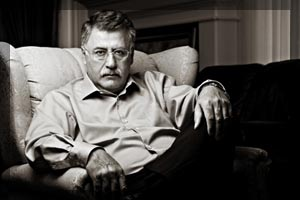
- Samir Sammoun
- Born: August 10, 1952 (age 74); Joun, Lebanon
- Known for: Artist
- Notable work: Olive Grove, Lake Champlain, Walking with Giants, Wheat Field, St. Joseph Oratory

Samir Sammoun (born August 10, 1952) is a Canadian–Lebanese artist and telecommunications engineer. He lives in the city of Brossard, Québec, since 1986. In 2017, the city of Brossard awarded him the Order of Merit for his contributions to culture and art at both the local and international levels.

== Early life ==
Samir Sammoun began painting in oils at the age of 13, while continuing his formal education. After completing studies at the Ecole des Arts et Metiers in Beirut in 1969, he emigrated to Montreal, Quebec, Canada in 1973 at the age of 21.

== Work and careers ==
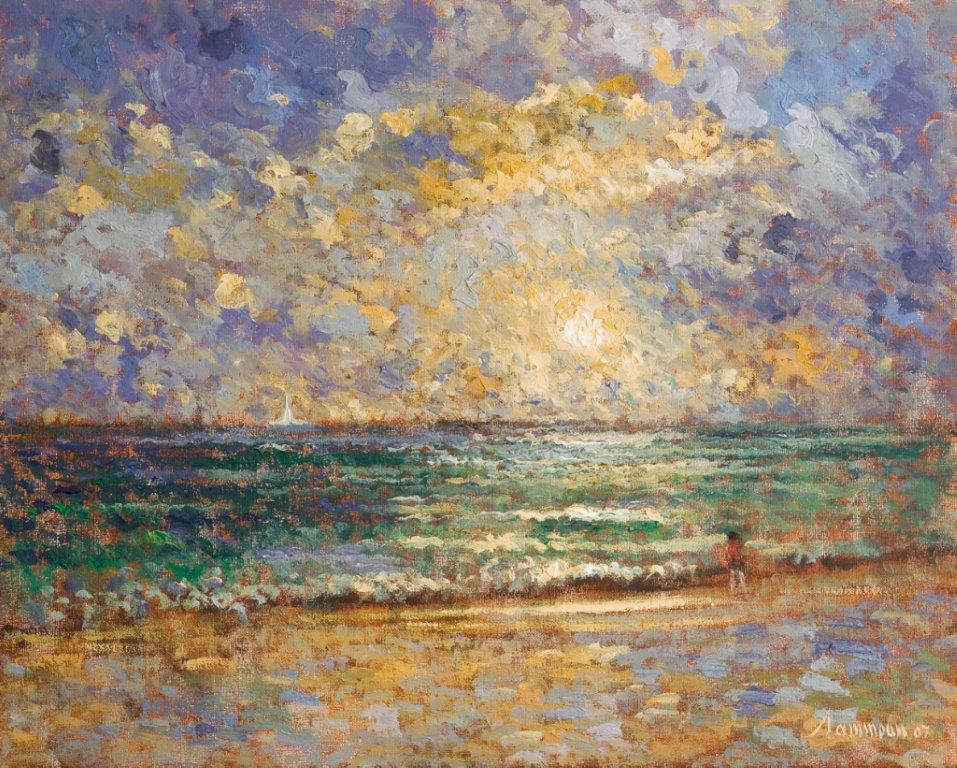
Sunny Isles Beach, Florida by Samir Sammoun 24x30 Original Oil on Canvas

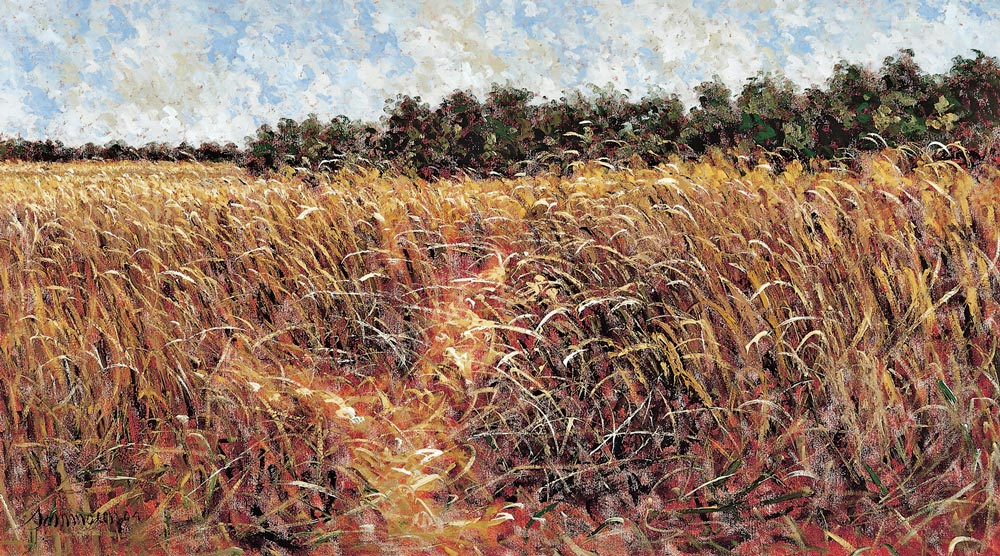
Wheat Field by Samir Sammoun Original Oil on Canvas 40x60

In 2003 Samir Sammoun was the invited guest of Emile J. Lahoud, President of Lebanon. His visit was featured in a segment on LBC-TV; and his painting Olive Grove was installed in the Baabda Palace, Presidential Palace in Beirut.

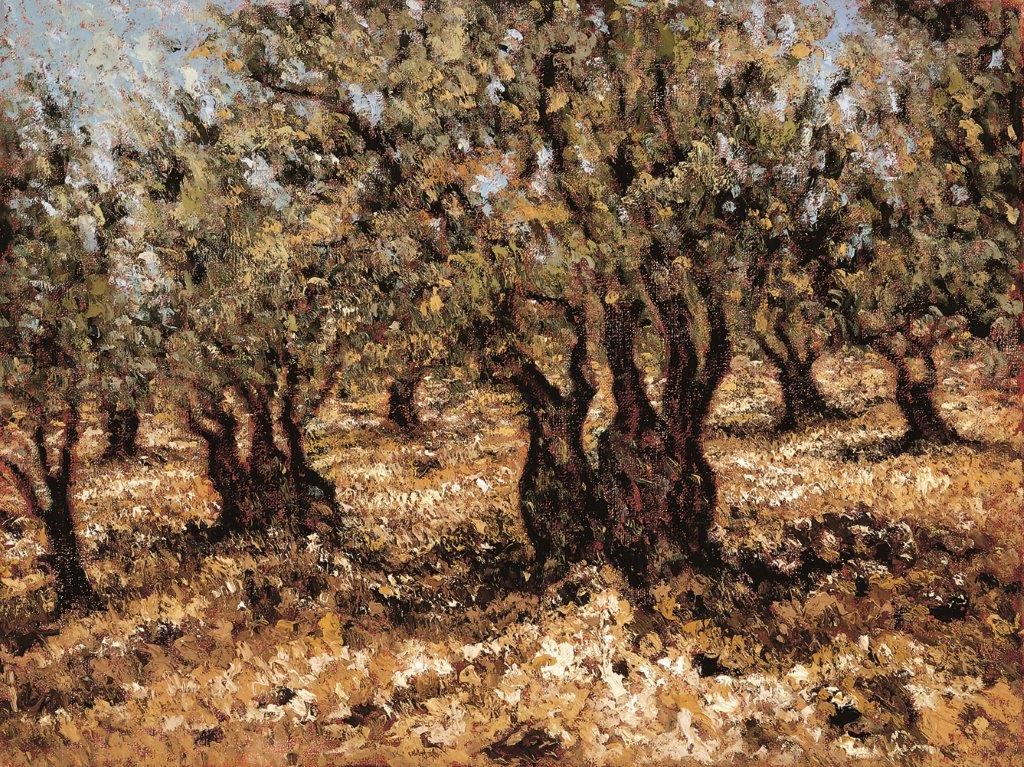
Olive Grove in Joun, Lebanon by Samir Sammoun

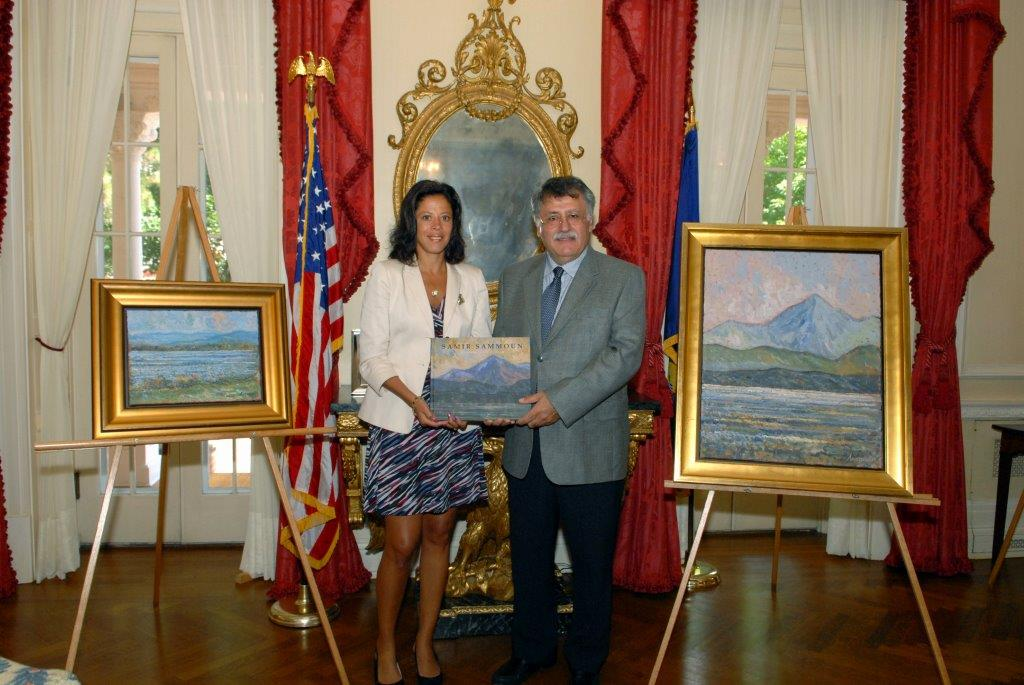
New York State First Lady Michelle Paige Paterson with Samir Sammoun at the Governor's Mansion

In 2009 he exhibited at the Plattsburgh State University Art Museum, Plattsburgh, New York to create a series of 18 oil paintings commemorating the 400th Anniversary of the European discovery of Lake Champlain. The paintings were exhibited there from May – July 2009, and featured in a live broadcast there on Fox TV; after which two were exhibited for a year at the Governor's mansion in Albany, upon the request of the First Lady of New York, Michelle Paige Paterson. Paintings from this group were also entered into the Plattsburgh State University Art Museum, and the Samuel de Champlain Museum's permanent collections.

Three of his paintings were acquired in 2011 by the Arab Fund for Economic and Social Development (AFESD) Museum of Kuwait, for their permanent collection.

Other Museum credits include a Group Exhibition at the McCord Museum in Montreal Feb–March 2002, a Guest Artist Exhibition at the Latino Art Museum in Pomona, California 2008 and a commission he painted in 1997 for the St. Joseph's Oratory, a National Historic Site in Montreal that receives 2.5 million visitors every year. Another painting was commissioned by Corporate Affairs International and donated to the government of Quebec. It is now included in the permanent collection of the Quebec government offices in Quebec City.

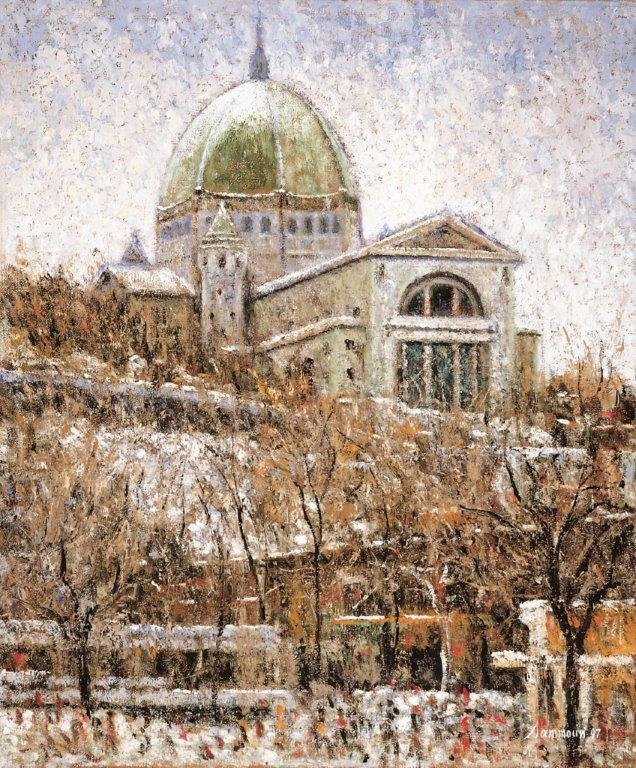
Saint Joseph Oratory by Samir Sammoun

== Works ==
Critics like Noel Meyer of MAGAZIN' ART have said, "Sammoun attempts to make his audience feel the wind blow through the trees, the heat in the air and the colours of the sky ..." Victor Forbes Editor of Fine Art Magazine, has said that "Sammoun's emotional investment in each work is evident in every canvas."

Paintings by Sammoun were in a 2012 group exhibition "Viewpoint and Vistas".

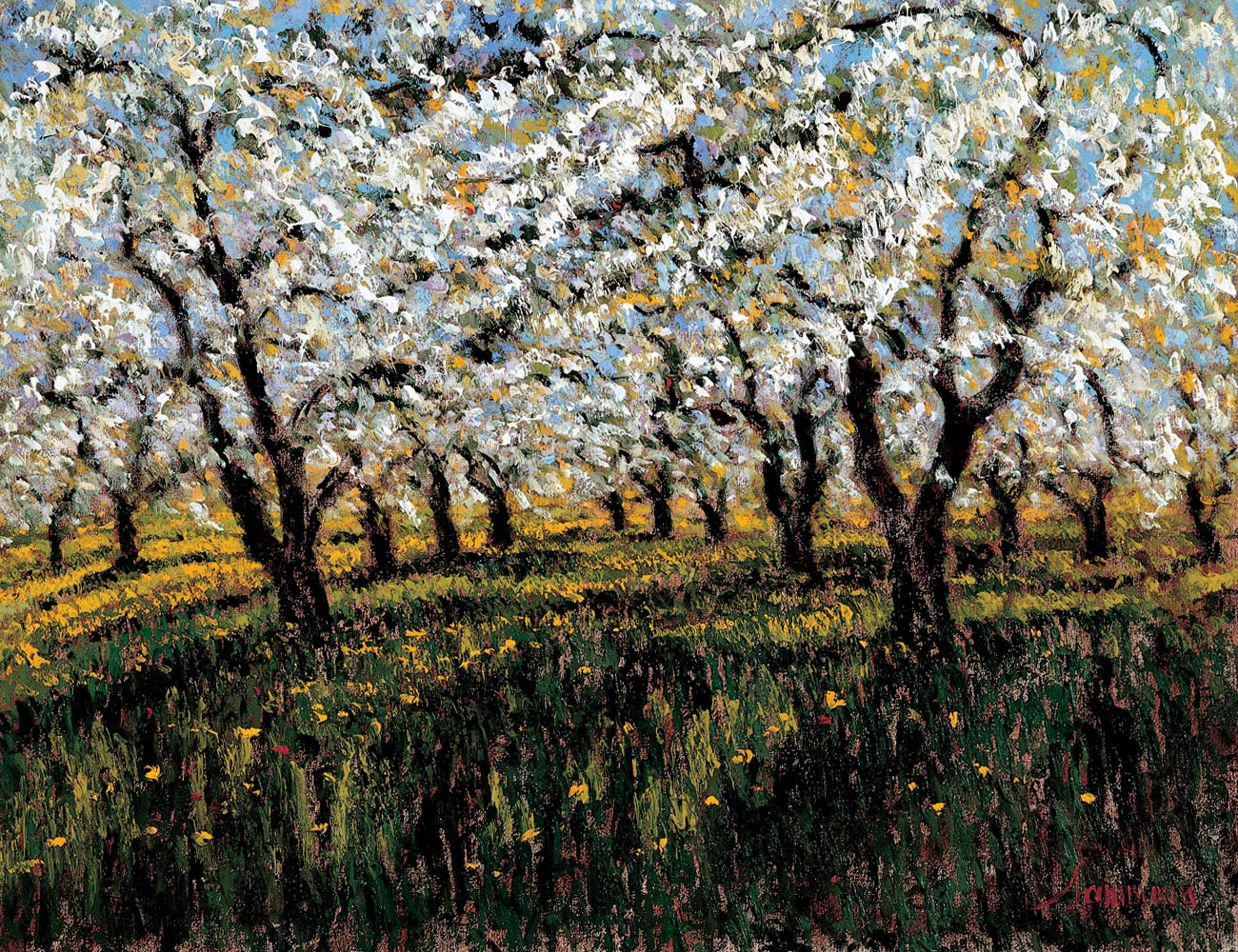
Apple Blossom by Samir Sammoun 24x30 Original on Canvas

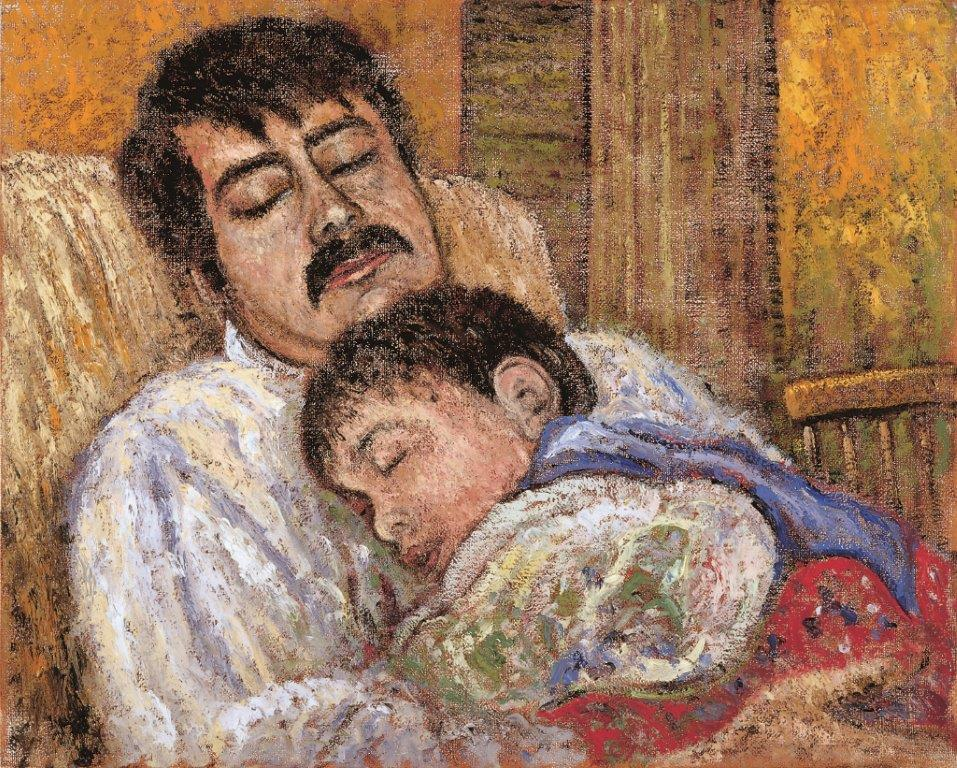
Samir Sammoun Self Portrait with his young son

== Publications ==
- Boston Museum of Fine Arts "Give the Arts a Chance" Catalog 2011, 2012
- Fine Art Magazine, Samir Sammoun in Montreal, Channeling Van Gogh, Victor Forbes, Winter 2006
- Musée des beaux-arts de Montreal – Galerie d'art Catalog. Foreword by Michelle Dionne, First Lady of Quebec. 2005
- Fine Art Magazine, Samir Sammoun Fields of Faith, Groves of Gratitude, Victor Forbes, Spring 2004
- Fine Art Magazine, Samir Sammoun Walking with Giants, Victor Forbes, Spring 2003
- Musèe Marc-Auréle Fortin Museum Catalog "Sammoun au Musée Marc-Auréle Fortin" 2003
- MAGAZINART, October 2000 : Samir Sammoun, Artiste Peintre de Grande Classe
- Samir Sammoun, Artiste Peintre de classe internationale, Pierre H. Savignac, 1996
- National Library of Canada, 1993
- Bibliothèque Nationale du Québec, 1992

== Solo exhibitions ==
- Galerie d'Orsay, Boston, Massachusetts, 2022, 2018, 2016, 2014, 2012, 2011, 2010, 2009, 2007, 2006, 2005, 2024.
- Onessimo Fine Art February 2013, 2024
- Hazelton Fine Art Gallery, Toronto, Ontario, 2022, 2023, 2024
- Hazelton Fine Art Gallery, Port Carling, Ontario, 2023
- Lily Pad Gallery, Milwaukee, United States, 2023, 2024.
- Tatum gallery, Red Bank, NJ, United States, 2023
- D`may gallery, Cape May, NJ, United States, 2023, 2024.
- Mary Martin Galleries of Fine Art, Charleston, SC, United States, 2023, 2024.

== Group exhibitions ==
- Context Art Miami, 2025
- Art Expo, New York, 2025, 2024, 2023
- IDS Toronto 2025
- Start art fair, 2023, Saatchi Gallery, London, UK
- Art San Diego, San Diego, 2022
- Art Expo, Dallas, 2022
- Art Santa Fe, Santa Fe, NM, United States, 2018, 2022
- LA Art Show, Los Angeles, California, USA, 2020, 2025
- Palm Beach Jewelry, Art & Antique Show
- Galerie d'Orsay "View Points & Vistas" 2012

== Corporate and public collections ==
His work is in private collections in the United States, Canada, Mexico, France, and England.
