= Ghazi Baker =

Lebanese architect and contemporary visual artist

Ghazi Baker (born 1967 in Beirut, Lebanon) is a Lebanese architect and contemporary visual artist working in painting, drawing, sculpture and printmaking. He lives and works in Beirut.

== Work ==
Baker's work is highly sought after by collectors in the Middle East, Europe and elsewhere. His work is present in institutional and foundation collections in Beirut, Dubai, Paris, New York and other locations.

Baker's style could be characterized as an exotic cocktail of lines, post-structuralist art, cerebral and deliberately anti-thematic. Always looking to highlight the process itself, his artistic influences include comic book art, music, movies, motorcycle culture, esoteric imagery, everyday life and the human condition.

== Selected exhibitions ==
- Beirut – Lebanon | 18 Nov 2014 "Decade-nce" Ghazi Baker solo exhibition
- Beirut – Lebanon | 15 Nov 2016 "Sins, Virtues & Colors" Solo show, mark Hachem gallery.
- Istanbul – Turkey | 11 March 2016 Contemporary Istanbul Art Fair
- Beirut – Lebanon | 21 Sep 2016 Beirut Art Fair 2016
- Miami – USA | 29 Nov 2016 Miami Art fair 2016
- Palm Beach – USA | 1 December 2017 Palm Beach modern & contemporary 2017
- Paris – France | 20 Jan 2017 Artists Collective, Mark Hachem Gallery Paris.
- Wynwood -USA | 16 Feb 2017 Art Wynwood 2017
- New York – USA | 3 February 2017 Scope New York 2017
- Basel – Switzerland | 13 Jun 2017 Scope Basel 2017
- Beirut – Lebanon | 21 Sep 2017 Beirut Art Fair 2017
- Paris – France | 23 Nov 2017 " CHROMESTHESIA" Solo show, Mark Hachem Gallery, Paris.
- Miami – USA | 12 May 2017 Scope Miami 2017
- New York – USA | 3 August 2018 Scope New York 2018
- Beirut - Lebanon | 28 March 2019 “Suspension of Disbelief” Ghazi Baker solo exhibition
- New York - USA | 10 March 2020 Volta New York 2020
- Amsterdam - Netherlands | 15 September 2022 at the Rijksmuseum
- Miami - USA | 4 December 2022 Miami Art Fair 2022
- Beirut - Lebanon | 27 April 2023 “Conversations” Ghazi Baker solo exhibition
- Beirut - Lebanon | 22 May 2025 “In Entropy” Ghazi Baker solo exhibition
- Paris - France | 6th June 2026 "Entanglement" Ghazi Baker solo exhibition
