= Georges Akl =

Lebanese painter, born in Damour

Georges Akl is a Lebanese painter, born in Damour.

== Career ==
He is noted for his colorful watercolor landscapes. He is often exhibited in Lebanon and had made exhibitions in Washington, Los Angeles and Cairo. He is also a theater director and an actor.
