= Huguette Caland =

Lebanese artist (1931–2019)

- أوغيت الخوري
- Born: Huguette El Khoury; 19 January 1931; Beirut, Lebanon
- Died: 23 September 2019 (aged 88); Beirut, Lebanon
- Education: American University of Beirut
- Known for: Painting, sculpture, fashion design
- Spouse: Paul Caland
- Father: Bechara El Khoury

Huguette Caland (Arabic: أوغيت الخوري; née El Khoury; 19 January 1931 – 23 September 2019) was a Lebanese painter, sculptor and fashion designer known for her erotic abstract paintings and body landscapes. Based out of Los Angeles, her art was displayed in numerous exhibitions and museums.

== Early life ==
Caland was born into a Lebanese political family in Beirut, Lebanon on 19 January 1931. Her father, Bechara El Khoury, became the first post-independence president of Lebanon in 1943, serving the country for nine years.

== Career ==
Caland came to art somewhat late in life, beginning her studies at the American University in Beirut in her 30s. In 1970, she moved to Paris where she lived and worked as an artist for 17 years. She became a regular guest at the Feraud studio, meeting many artists, including André Masson, Pierre Schaeffer, and Adalberto Mecarelli. In 1979, Caland collaborated with designer Pierre Cardin, creating a line of caftans that were displayed at Espace Cardin. In 1983, Caland met Romanian sculptor George Apostu. From 1983 to 1986, they worked in Paris and in the Limousin, creating many paintings and sculptures during this time.

== Later life and death ==
Caland moved back to Los Angeles in 1987, where she lived and worked for the next years. In 2013 she returned to Beirut to say goodbye to her dying husband and remained there until the end of her life.

Among other exhibitions, Caland's work was included in the 2021 exhibition Women in Abstraction at the Centre Pompidou.

== Exhibitions ==
=== Solo exhibitions ===
- Huguette Caland, Galerie Janine Rubeiz, Beirut, 2011
- Huguette Caland Retrospective, Beirut Exhibition Center, 2013
- Solo exhibition, Galerie Janine Rubeiz, Beirut, 2018
- Tate St Ives, St Ives, UK, 2019
- "Faces and Places" Mathaf: Arab Museum of Modern Art, Doha, August to December 2020
- "Huguette Caland: Tête-à-Tête" The Drawing Center, New York City, June 11–September 19, 2021
- "Huguette Caland: My Home" Lisson Gallery, New York, NY, May 13 - July 25, 2026

=== Group exhibitions ===
- Art from Lebanon, Beirut Exhibition Center, 2012
- Institut du Monde Arabe, Paris, 2012
- Prospect 3 Biennale, New Orleans, 2014
- Frieze Masters, London, 2014
- Hammer Museum, Made in L.A., 2016
- 57th Biennale de Venezia, 2017
