= Hanibal Srouji =

Visual artist

Hanibal Srouji (born 1957 in Beirut, Lebanon) is a Lebanese painter. He graduated in 1987 from Concordia University, Montreal. He lived in Canada and France before returning in his country. Srouji developed a technique of burning holes in his paintings after having participated to numerous workshops in America and Europe, including the Triangle Arts Trust. He currently teaches at the Lebanese American University.

== Life and work ==
Srouji's art deals with his nostalgia for Lebanon, as he emigrated at the beginning of the Lebanese Civil War. At the beginning of the war, Srouji served as Red Cross volunteer in Southern Lebanon, an experience he later compared to horror movies. He ultimately escaped from Sidon by boat to Cyprus before emigrating to Canada. Shortly after the end of the war, Srouji traveled back to Lebanon to try to pick up the pieces.

Hanibal Srouji became known for using a blow-torch to create small hales and lines. His paintings remind one of bullet-marked walls of crippled buildings in Beirut and encompass the human emotions in the aftermath of the civil war. Another series has been dominated by vertical lines that represent the bars of a cage, as signs of confinement, but can also be read as bars of a musical composition.

Although Srouji is considered as an abstract painter, his recent work, Terre/Mer ("land/sea"), evoked landscapes.

== Awards ==
- Ahmed Asseleh Prize, Algiers, 1999
- "Mérite et dévouement français", Art Silver Medal, 1997
- 49th Saint-Cloud exhibition Grand Prize, Musée des Avelines, 1997.

== Publications ==
- Hanibal Srouji: Painting fire, water, earth and air, Gregory Buchakjian and Sary Tadros (Galerie Janine Rubeiz, 2013)
- Paroles d’Artistes: Hanibal Srouji (L’Agenda Culturel, 2010)

== Selected exhibitions ==
=== Solo exhibitions ===
- "Anti Gravity", Galerie Eulenspiegel, Basel, Switzerland,2016
- Into the Clouds, Singapore Art Fair, with Galerie Janine Rubeiz, Singapore, 2014
- Head in the Clouds, Galerie Janine Rubeiz, Beirut, 2014
- Cages, June Kelly Gallery, New York, 2011
- Healing Bands, Europia, Paris, 2011
- Hanibal Srouji, FFA Private Bank, Beirut, 2010
- Healing Bands, Galerie Eulenspiegel, Basel, 2009
- Offrandes, Galerie Janine Rubeiz, Beirut, 2009
- Touches, Galerie Janine Rubeiz, Beirut, 2006
- Hanibal Srouji, Service Culturel Municipal, Gentilly, 2005
- Hanibal Srouji, Galerie Eulenspiegel, Basel, 2004
- Hanibal Srouji, Galerie Janine Rubeiz, Beirut, 2003
- Transformations, Galerie Janine Rubeiz, Beirut, 2003
- Particules, Galerie Janine Rubeiz, Beirut, 1997

=== Group exhibitions ===
- "Musee Sursock, 32e Salon D’AutomneE", Sursock Museum, Beirut, 2016
- "BITASARROF", the Lebanese national Library, 2016
- "MAC International", The MAC's first open arts prize – Shortlisted 2014 – Belfast, Northern Ireland, 2014 –
- "Syri-Arts, 101 Works of Art for Syrian Refugee Children in Lebanon", Beirut Exhibition Center, 2013
- "Tjreed – a selection of Arab Abstract Art, 1908–1960", CAP, Contemporary Art Platform, Kuwait, 2013
- "Vous avez dit Abstrait" – Exposition collective, Galerie Tanit, Beirut, 2013
- "Art Dubai, 2013", & "ABU DHABI Art, 2013", Galerie Janine Rubeiz, UAE, 2013
- Pellicula, Galerie Janine Rubeiz, Beirut, 2013
- Vous avez dit abstrait?, Galerie Tanit, Beirut, 2013
- Subtitled: With Narratives from Lebanon, Royal College of Art, London, 2011
- Rebirth, Lebanon 21st Century Contemporary Art, Beirut Exhibition Art Center, Beirut, 2011
- Convergence, New Art from Lebanon, The American University Museum, Katzen Arts Center, Washington DC, 2010
