= Chucrallah Fattouh =

Lebanese painter

Chucrallah Fattouh is a Lebanese painter. He was born in Monsef, Byblos, and graduated from the Lebanese University’s Faculty of Fine Arts in 1983.

Fattouh made his first painting aged 12. His first paintings that sold were portraits of his mother. After graduating from the Lebanese University, he began a prolific career as a painter.

== Exhibitions ==
=== In Lebanon ===
Galerie Chahine
Galerie Tabbal, Beirut
Galerie Portfolio, Kaslik
Galerie Bekhazi, Beirut
Rizk Plaza, Broumana
Galerie Station des Arts, Beirut
Museum Sursock, Beirut (permanent exhibition)
Chambre de Commerce et de l’Industrie, Beirut
Citadelle de Tripoli
Artuel, Beirut
Park Hotel, Chtaura
Galerie Graffiti, Chtaura
La Fiad, Beirut
Open-Air Exhibition, Byblos
Galerie Piazza Del Bambino, Byblos
Galerie Bronté, Beirut
Galerie du Palais Municipal, Jounieh
Hotel Saint-Georges, Beirut

=== International exhibitions ===
Galerie Opus, Nicosia, Cyprus
Peter’s Gallery, Limassol, Cyprus
Palais de l’ UNESCO, Paris, France.
Royal Jordan Center, Amman, Jordan
Palais Drouot, Paris, France
Gloria Gallery, Nicosie, Cyprus
Galerie Philippides, Limassol, Cyprus
Green Art Gallery, Dubai, UAE
City Art Gallery, Stockholm, Sweden
Chateau de Boutheon, Lyon, France
Carthage, Tunisia
Cultural Foundation, Abu Dhabi, UAE
Sheraton Hotel, Abu Dhabi, UAE
Palais Drouot, UNESCO, Paris, France
Chateau de Boutheon, Lyon, France
Grand Central Art Center, California, USA
Deco Fair, Jeddah, KSA
