= Lebanese Academy of Fine Arts =

Fine arts school of the University of Balamand

The Lebanese Academy of Fine Arts (ALBA; Arabic: الأكاديمية اللبنانية للفنون الجميلة) was originally a stand-alone Lebanese institute, now part of the University of Balamand. It was founded in 1937, and it was the first national institution of higher education in Lebanon. In 1988, it joined the University of Balamand in the Koura District, Lebanon, during its foundation as one of the three founding faculties at the time.

The Academy currently offers several programs in French in its original location in Sin el Fil, Beirut. They include, but are not limited to, architecture, decorative arts, plastic arts, urban and regional planning, Graphic Design, Digital art direction, Fashion design and audiovisual directing. In October 2000, the University of Balamand launched new programs in English for the faculty at its main campus in El-Koura, which now consists of Architecture, Interior Architecture, Graphic Design and Computer Graphics And Interactive Media.

== History ==
Founded in 1937 by a group of young classical musicians led by the engineer Alexis Boutros.

=== Details on the foundations of its fields ===
In 1943, a branch of architecture was sponsored by the famous French engineer Daniel Abou Dargham.

In 1948, the school of letters was created which graduated specialists in literature, history and geography.

There followed in 1949 by the school of political and economic science.

In 1950, the academy set up a school of law, which was forced to close later in 1959.

In a later stage, additional fields of study were added to the basic core such as the school of classic dance, the school of acting and the school of sculpture.

The academy added new sections of publicity and information in 1975, and audio-visual production in 1987, and urban studies in 1994

Soon after the death of Alexis Boutros, Mr. Georges Haddad was appointed dean of Alba in 1979. He struggled during the civil war to keep the programs running. He managed to achieve the fusion with University of Balamand in 1988.

In 2000, the academy started offering the "Interior Architecture and design and Graphic Design" programs in English under supervision of Mr. George Fiani.

In 2009, the Architecture and CGIM programs were offered at Balamand Campus. The same year, The long-time caretaker of ALBA, Mr. George Haddad died.

Mr. Bekhazi was shortly after appointed "Dean of ALBA" by the University of Balamand.

In 2014, mr. George Fiani was appointed Director of ALBA- Koura Campus.

The present Dean of ALBA is Fadlallah Dagher and the Director of ALBA- Koura Campus is Joseph Haddad.

== Administrative formation ==
Dr. Elias L. Warrak, President of UOB,

Pr. Fadlallah Dagher, Dean of ALBA- Sin el Fil Campus,

Mr. Joseph Haddad, Director of ALBA- Balamand Campus,

Alongside a great administrative and educational body, on both campuses, working, aiming and aiding the higher officers to achieve better educational experience day-by-day...

== Current Programs ==
Majors offered at ALBA-Sin el Fil Campus (French Programs)/ Pr. Fadlallah Dagher

1- Architecture: " Licence, Master "

2- Arts Visuels: " Licence, Master "

3- Mode: " Licence, Master "

4- Arts Décoratifs:

Section Architecture d'Intérieur " Licence, Master "

Section Design " Licence, Master "

Section Arts Graphiques et Publicité

- Graphisme et Publicité " Licence, Master "

- Animation 2D/3D " Licence, Master "

- Illustration " Licence, Master "

- Multimedia " Licence, Master "

5- Cinéma et Réalisation Audiovisuelle " Licence, Master "

6- Institut d'Urbanisme

- Architecture du paysage " Licence "

- Aménagement du Paysage " Master "

Majors offered at ALBA-:Balamand Campus (English Programs)/ Mr. Joseph Haddad:

1- Graphic Design BFA, MFA

2- Interior Architecture and Design BFA, MFA

3- Architecture B.S Architecture, M.ARCH

4- Computer Graphics and Interactive Media BFA, MFA

5- Art Teaching Diploma TD

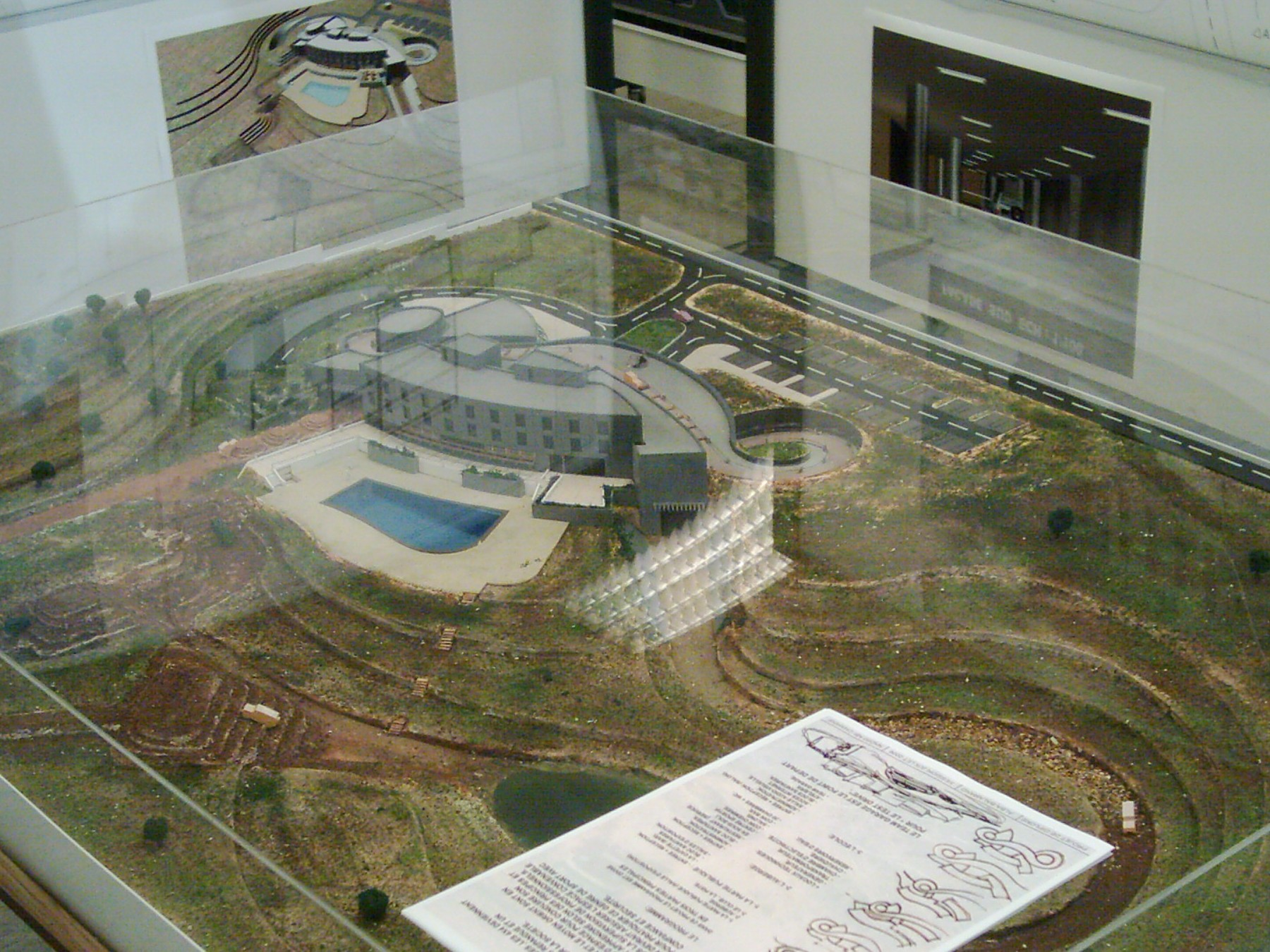
In Lebanon, ALBA is most known for its school of architecture.

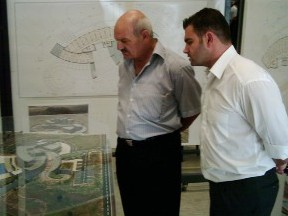
Students of ALBA taking leading positions in many local and international institutions.

== Additional references ==
- University of Balamand: Lebanese Academy of Fine Arts website—(in English)
- Alba.edu.lb: Lebanese Academy of Fine Arts website
- Lebweb.com: Lebanese Academy of Fine Arts
- Cin.org: University of Balamand
