= BiennaleOnline =

Online contemporary art exhibition

- Genre: Art exhibition
- Date: 2012
- Frequency: Bi-annually
- Inaugurated: April 26, 2013
- Founders: David Dehaeck; Nathalie Haveman; Arthur Madna
- Website: www.biennaleonline.org

BiennaleOnline is an online exhibition of contemporary art. The exhibition aims to focus on the most promising emerging visual artists worldwide, presenting works in New Media, Installation, Traditional Media, Photography and Performance. These artists will come from Europe, North America, South America, Asia, and the Middle East, and have been selected by 29 leading international curators.

The inaugural exhibition launched on April 26, 2013, and is called "Reflection & Imagination" with Jan Hoet † serving as the artistic director.

== Overview ==
BiennaleOnline was founded by David Dehaeck, Nathalie Haveman and Arthur Madna in 2012. The exhibition was set to be launched in September 2012, however it was moved to April 2013. The exhibition is organized by ARTPLUS, a mobile exhibition platform for art lovers and collectors of contemporary art.

The first BiennaleOnline is directed by Jan Hoet. Hoet previously served as the artistic director of Documenta IX and the museum MARTa Herford, Germany, and was a founder of SMAK in Ghent, Belgium. 25 artists, which are carefully chosen by Hoet, will be represented in the center section of the exhibition called "Reflection & Imagination". Jan Hoet died in a hospital in Ghent on February 27, 2014.

BiennaleOnline is the first of its kind, curated, exclusively online biennial exhibition of contemporary art. 29 Leading international curators select 183 artists. BiennaleOnline aimes to offer an exhibition which breaks away from the conventional notion of Art as an elite pastime, confined to faraway galleries and those with the leisure and funds to enjoy it.

BiennaleOnline started with a "Pay What You want" payment wall. The founders very soon noticed that it was blocking visitors from entering the exhibition. In the best interest of the artists it was decided in May 2012 to remove the payment wall to ensure maximum exposure of their works. Soon after the removal of the payment wall the number of visitors surged to 400.000 within 1 year after opening.

== Exhibitions ==
Exhibition		Launched	Artistic Director	Central Exhibition	Artists	Curators	Visitors
I	BiennaleOnline 2013	May 2, 2013	Jan Hoet	"Reflection & Imagination"	183	29	400,000

== Artists ==
The participating artists are:

- Zarouhie Abdalian (United States)
- Meriç Algün Ringborg (Sweden)
- Edgardo Aragon (Mexico)
- Francesco Arena (Italy)
- Marcela Armas (Mexico)
- Ed Atkins (United Kingdom)
- Nicolás Bacal (Argentina)
- Guy Bar Amotz (Israel)
- Niclas Bacal (Argentina)
- Bertille Bak (France)
- Wojciech Bąkowski (Poland)
- Eduardo Basualdo (Argentina)
- Stefania Batoeva ( United Kingdom)
- Neil Beloufa (France)
- Atul Bhalla (India)
- Beni Bischof (Switzerland)
- Rossella Biscotti (Italy)
- Katinka Bock (France)
- Gwenneth Boelens (Netherlands)
- Thomas Bogaert (Belgium)
- Juliette Bonneviot (France)
- Pawet Bownik (Poland)
- Veronica Brovall (Germany)
- Sophie Bueno Boutellier (Germany)
- Michał Budny (Poland)
- Giuseppe Campuzano (Peru)
- Nina Canell (Germany)
- Rodrigo Cass (Brazil)
- Francesco Cavaliere (Germany)
- Tony Chakar (Lebanon)
- Rosa Chancho (Argentina)
- Alejandro Chaskielberg (Argentina)
- Jeanette Chávez (Germany)
- Chieh-Jen Chen (Taiwan)
- Paolo Chiasera (Germany)
- Vaast Colson (Belgium)
- Sarah Conaway (United States)
- Michael Dean (United Kingdom)
- Koenraad Dedobbeleer (Belgium)
- Raphaëlle de Groot (Canada)
- Edith Dekyndt (Belgium)
- Virginia De Medeiros (Brazil)
- Liz Deschenes (United States)
- Desire Machine Collective (United Kingdom)
- Jessica Dickinson (United States)
- Eitan Efrat (Belgium)
- Nezaket Ekici (Germany)
- Charlie Engman (United Kingdom)
- Sirah Foighel Brutmann (Belgium)
- Linda Fregni Nagler (Italy)
- Giuseppe Gabellone (Italy)
- Leyla Gediz (Turkey)
- Mariam Ghani (United States)
- Babak Golkar (Canada)
- Kristin Grey Apple (United States)
- Meta Grgurevič (Slovenia)
- Osang Gwon (Korea, Republic of)
- Hadley+Maxwell (Germany)
- Petrit Halilaj (Germany)
- Susan Hefuna (Germany)
- Thomas Helbig (Germany)
- Calle Holck (Sweden)
- James T. Hong (Taiwan)
- Jonathan Horowitz (United States)
- Vlatka Horvat (United Kingdom)
- Carlos Irijalba (Netherlands)
- Fritzia Irizar (Mexico)
- Sarah Anne Johnson (Canada)
- Regina José Galindo (Guatemala)
- Leja Jurišić (Slovenia)
- Nikita Kadan (Ukraine)
- Franka Kassner (Germany)
- Ragnar Kjartansson (performance artist) (Iceland)
- Paul Kneale (United Kingdom)
- Thomas Kratz (Germany)
- Robert Kuśmirowski (Poland)
- Zin Kijong (Korea, Republic of)
- Sheun-Chi Kwan (Hong Kong)
- Guillaume Leblon (France)
- Changwon Lee (Korea, Republic of)
- Sojung Lee (Korea, Republic of)
- Gauthier Leroy (France)
- Ellen Lesperance (United States)
- Ryan Lobo (India)
- Jarbas Lopes (Belgium)
- Nicola Lopez (United States)
- Maider Lopez (Spain)
- Flo Maak (Germany)
- Kevin Simon Mancera (Colombia)
- Luiza Margan (Slovenia)
- Taus Makhacheva (United Kingdom)
- Maria Marshall (United Kingdom)
- Hiroyuki Masuyama (Germany)
- Manuel Mathar (Mexico)
- Mediengruppe Bitnik (Switzerland)
- Wesley Meuris (Belgium)
- Maro Michalakakos (Greece)
- Mikael Mikael (Germany)
- Adrien Missika (France)
- Marge Monko (Estonia)
- Ivan Moudov (Bulgaria)
- Marlie Mul (Germany)
- Carter Mull (United States)
- Marina Naprushkina (Germany)
- Otobong Nkanga (Belgium)
- Uri Nir (Israel)
- Navid Nuur (Netherlands)
- Christine Ödlund (Sweden)
- Ahmet Ögüt (Netherlands)
- Teatro Ojo (Mexico)
- Nikolay Oleynikov (Russian Federation)
- Daniela Ortiz (Spain)
- Şener Özmen (Turkey)
- Amilkar Packer (Brazil)
- Anna Parkina (Russian Federation)
- Slawomir Pawszak (Poland)
- Kiko Perez (Spain)
- Dulce Pinzón (Mexico)
- Falke Pisano (Netherlands)
- Frédéric Platéus (Belgium)
- Sharon Poliakine (Israel)
- Paloma Polo (Spain)
- Agnieszka Polska (Poland)
- Nicolas Provost (Belgium)
- Florian Quistrebert (France)
- Michael Quistrebert (France)
- Shiming Qiu (China)
- Timofey Radya (Russian Federation)
- Camila Ramirez (Chile)
- Lucy Raven (United States)
- Teja Reba (Slovenia)
- Mandla Reuter (Switzerland)
- Beau Rhee (United States)
- Evariste Richer (France)
- Rubedo (United Kingdom)
- Jeremy Shaw (Germany)
- Lieko Shiga (Japan)
- Gabriel Sierra (Colombia)
- Praneet Soi (India)
- Julia Spinola (Spain)
- Yi-Jou Sun (Taiwan)
- Corin Sworn (United Kingdom)
- Alberto Tadiello (Italy)
- Pilvi Takala (Finland)
- L.N. Tallur (Korea, Republic of)
- Zin Taylor (Belgium)
- Angélica Teuta (Colombia)
- Clarissa Tossin (United States)
- Katerina Undo (Belgium)
- Ignacio Uriarte (Germany)
- Harm van den Dorpel (Germany)
- Joris van de Moortel (Belgium)
- Jan van Imschoot (Belgium)
- Stela Vasileva (Bulgaria)
- Yvonne Venegas (Mexico)
- Ben Vickers (United Kingdom)
- Vincent Vulsma (Netherlands)
- Suse Weber (Germany)
- Chen Wei (artist) (China)
- Jennifer West (United States)
- Holly White (United Kingdom)
- Pavel Wolberg (Israel)
- Zorka Wollny (Poland)
- Doris Wong (Hong Kong)
- Chung-Yu Wong (China)
- Wong Wai Yin (Hong Kong)
- Jui-Chung Yao (Taiwan)
- Motoi Yamamoto (Japan)
- Samira Yamin (United States)
- Xiang Yang (United States)
- Yeesookyung (Korea, Republic of)
- Wei-li Yeh (Taiwan)
- Masha Yozefpolsky (Israel)
- Cheng-Ta Yu (Taiwan)
- Tobias Zielony (Germany)
- Kijong Zin (Korea, Republic of)

== Curators ==
The team consists of leading international curators who are affiliated with prestigious museums such as the Guggenheim Museum and the Jewish Museum in New York City, United States; Palais de Tokyo in Paris, France; the Serpentine Gallery in London, United Kingdom; Moderna Museet in Stockholm, Sweden; Museum of Modern Art in Warsaw, Poland; SMAK in Ghent, Belgium; Leeum – Samsung Museum of Art in Seoul, South Korea; the Museum of Contemporary Art in Tokyo, Japan; the National Gallery of Canada in Ottawa, Ontario, Canada; the MAC in Hornu, Belgium and the Museum of Contemporary Art in Detroit, Canada.

The participating curators are:

- Rodrigo Alonso (Argentina)
- Laurent Busine (Belgium)
- Adriano Pedrosa (Brazil)
- Iara Boubnova (Bulgaria)
- Josée Drouin-Brisebois (Canada)
- Gerardo Mosquera (Cuba)
- Rebecca Lamarche-Vadel (France)
- Martin Germann (Germany)
- Katerina Gregos (Greece)
- Chang Tsong-zung (Hong Kong)
- Ranjit Hoskote (India)
- Gideon Ofrat (Israel)
- Vincenzo de Bellis (Italy)
- Yuko Hasegawa (Japan)
- Hyunsun Tae (South Korea)
- Cuauhtémoc Medina (Mexico)
- Lorenzo Benedetti (Netherlands)
- Joanna Mytkowska (Poland)
- Elena Sorokina (Russia)
- Nataša Petrešin-Bachelez (Slovenia)
- Javier Hontoria (Spain)
- Daniel Birnbaum (Sweden)
- Giovanni Carmine (Switzerland)
- Manray Hsu (Taiwan)
- Fulya Erdemci (Turkey)
- Hans Ulrich Obrist (UK)
- Nancy Spector (USA East)
- Jens Hoffmann (USA West)
