= Andree Sfeir-Semler =

Lebanese art dealer

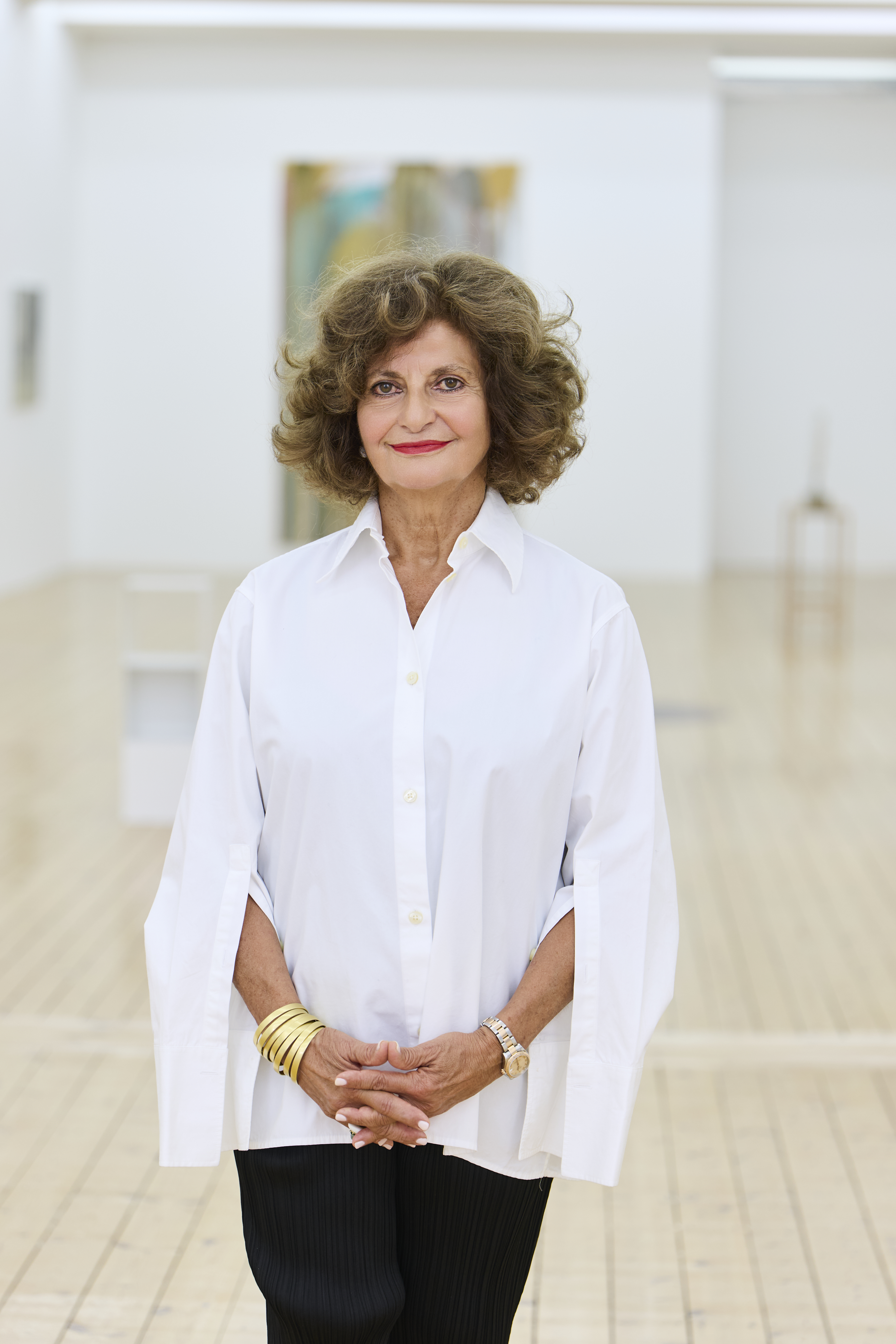
Andrée Sfeir-Semler, 2025, Photo: Volker Renner

Andrée Sfeir-Semler (born 1953 in Beirut, Lebanon) is a German-Lebanese art historian and gallery owner. Her Sfeir-Semler Gallery has branches in Hamburg, Germany and Beirut, Lebanon, and both locations represent artists working in the field of conceptual art with a preference on political subjects. Since 2003, Sfeir-Semler Gallery has focused on contemporary art from the Arab World.

== Early life and education ==
Sfeir-Semler studied fine art at the American University of Beirut and filmmaking at the "Centre for cinema and television" in Beirut. In 1975 she was awarded a Fulbright Program Scholarship and a DAAD German Academic Exchange Service scholarship to continue her studies as a filmmaker. She opted for the latter. She continued her studies at the universities of Munich, Bielefeld with Wolfgang Mager & Juergen Kocka and at the Sorbonne with Pierre Bourdieu. She finished her PhD in 1980 with a thesis entitled "Die Maler am Pariser Salon: 1791 - 1880" (English: The Painters at the Paris Salon: 1791-1880). The book is a computer-based social history of the 19th-century French art scene.

== Gallery ==
In 1985 Sfeir-Semler opened her first gallery in Kiel, Germany. In 1998, she moved the gallery to Hamburg, where the German branch of Sfeir-Semler Gallery is still based.

Beirut gallery: "After 20 years running a top-notch blue-chip contemporary gallery for minimal and conceptual art in Hamburg, owner Andree Sfeir-Semler decided she wanted to expand her business and return to the city she left behind in 1975." In April 2005, on the 20th anniversary of the opening of her German gallery, she made her Beirut exhibition début with "Flight 405", a group show of work by The Atlas Group/Walid Raad, Elger Esser, Alfredo Jaar, Emily Jacir, Amal al Kenawy, Till Krause, Hiroyuki Masuyama, Michelangelo Pistoletto, and Akram Zaatari. Since then she has mounted numerous exhibitions including the first one-person-shows in the Middle East by Walid Raad (2008), Akram Zaatari (2009), Wael Shawky (2011), Marwan (2009), Yto Barrada (2010), Etel Adnan (2010), Mounira al Solh (2011), Hassan Sharif (2012), and Gabriel Kuri (2012).

Her Beirut gallery has hosted diverse curatorial projects including a group show of young Egyptian artists "Out of Place"(2006), curated by William Wells of the Cairo Townhouse Gallery, Catherine David’s "In the Middle of the Middle" (2008), Bidoun Magazine’s show "NOISE" (2009) by Negar Azimi and Babak Radboy, "Au Delà des Images (Beyond Images)" (2006) with works of the Fond National d'Art Contemporain, France, curated by Jean Marc Prévost & Akram Zaatari, and "HomeWorks" (2008), a recurring forum on Contemporary Art based in Beirut organized by Christine Tohmé, director of Ashkal Alwan.

Sfeir-Semler Gallery also represents established European and American artists including Robert Barry, Elger Esser, Ian Hamilton Finlay, Hans Haacke, Günter Haese, Sol LeWitt, Timo Nasseri, Michelangelo Pistoletto, Ulrich Rückriem, Christine Streuli, therefore nurturing a cross-cultural link between Western and Middle Eastern contemporary art practices.

== Artists ==
- Etel Adnan
- Mounira Al Solh
- Yto Barrada
- Robert Barry
- Taysir Batniji
- Bert de Beul
- Balthasar Burkhard
- Aref El Rayess
- Elger Esser
- Ian Hamilton Finlay
- Hans Haacke
- Günter Haese
- Christian Hahn
- Sol LeWitt
- MARWAN
- Hiroyuki Masuyama
- Rabih Mroué
- Timo Nasseri
- The Atlas Group/Walid Raad
- Khalil Rabah
- Marwan Rechmaoui
- Ulrich Rückriem
- Wael Shawky
- Christine Streuli
- Rayyane Tabet
- Akram Zaatari

== Further references ==
- Beirut Gallery Weathers War, Artnet News, 27 July 2006
- Kaelen Wilson-Goldie: Less Roses, The Daily Star, August 2007
- Lucy Fielder, Make some NOISE, Sfeir’s show challenges the idea of art galleries, Now Lebanon, 16 December 2009, s.p.
- Andrée Sfeir-Semler interviewed by Andrew Mc Clintock, SFAQ International Arts and Culture, Issue.9, May 2012, pp. 52–54
- Kaelen Wilson-Goldie: Mundane objects in a disemboweled space, The Daily Star, 17 August 2012
