= Gregory Sholette =

New York-based artist, educator, and activist

Gregory Sholette is a New York-based artist, writer, educator, and activist. He is a Professor of Sculpture and Social Practice at Queens College, City University of New York, Co-Director of Social Practice CUNY, alongside professor Chloë Bass, and Headquartered in the Center for the Humanities, at the Graduate Center. Between 2011 and 2014 he served as a charter member of the Home Workspace Curriculum Committee in Beirut, Lebanon.

Sholette completed his PhD in the Memory Studies and Heritage Program, University of Amsterdam, in 2017. He holds an Master of Fine Arts from the University of California, San Diego (1995); a Bachelor of Fine Arts from The Cooper Union 1979; and was selected to be a Helena Rubinstein Fellow in Critical Studies (1995–1996) at the Whitney Museum of American Art's Independent Studies Program (ISP).

== Career ==
Sholette co-founded several New York City based art collectives and group projects, including Political Art Documentation/Distribution or PAD/D (1980-1988) with Jerry Kearns and Lucy R. Lippard; REPOhistory (1989-2000); Gulf Labor Coalition (2011-ongoing) with Naeem Mohaiemen, Andrew Ross and Walid Raad; and co-organized the projects Imaginary Archive (2010-ongoing), It's The Political Economy, Stupid! with Oliver Ressler (2012-2016); and Dark Matter Supercollider Games (2015, S.a.L.E Docks cultural center, Venice, Italy).

Sholette is also an author and editor and has written for journals such as e-flux, Afterimage, Artforum, CAA Art Journal, FIELD, Hyperallergic, Oxford Art Journal, Texte zur Kunst, and the Journal of Aesthetics and Protest, among others.

=== Art and exhibitions ===
Sholette has curated several traveling exhibitions. While he was Curator of Education at the New Museum in 1998, he curated the "Urban Encounters” exhibit, which highlighted the work of six Manhattan activist art collectives "generating political ferment and a lot of good art." His conceptual group project Imaginary Archive (2010-2015) consists of a collection of documents that suggest an alternative social reality, takes "the notion of collaboration as a living, working material to be debated, explored and tested." The installation project has traveled the cities of Kyiv, Graz, Galway, Philadelphia, Friedrichshafen, and Wellington in New Zealand.

In 2017, Sholette's solo exhibition Darker, a series of ink, pencil and acrylic wash drawings based on photographs of activist art and other political protests, was presented at Station Independent Projects. The project depicted "art activism in dark tones," and examined "how dark matter is visualized and activated in mixed media works that explore recent moments of protest." In 2022, he contributed to traveling exhibition Art for the Future: Artists Call and Central American Solidarities with "Insurrection," which featured "a short text repeatedly silkscreened on four adjacent panels that remain half-concealed under a lush thicket of synthetic flora native to Latin America."

== Art criticism ==
Although his work has been criticized for primarily focusing on the New York art scene, Sholette has made three principal contributions in the field of art criticism and aesthetics.

=== Tactical media ===
Building upon the concept of tactical media, Sholette, along with Gene Ray, challenged the political relevance of tactical media and DIY creative strategies in the context of ongoing privatization and securitization in 2008. Sholette first addressed this topic in 2004 with The Interventionists: A Users' Manual for the Creative Disruption of Everyday Life, co-edited with Nato Thompson.

=== Collective artistic labor ===
In Collectivism after Modernism: The Art of Social Imagination, Sholette and Blake Stimson argue that the true potential of artistic collectivism can only be understood if it is historicized. Sholette and Stimson both claim that collaborative collectively produced artwork emerges as a central tool in challenging capitalism’s thrive for individualism, but that its form has undergone a fundamental change in the contemporary period following the collapse of modernism. In collaboration with art critics and scholars such as Jelena Stojanović, Reiko Tomii, Okwui Enwezor, Alan Moore and Brian Holmes, the authors push for the periodization of collectivism after modernity (Futurism, Productivism, Constructivism, and Surrealism), and in the post-World War II era. In this way, the book attempts "to understand the various forms of postwar collectivism as historically determined phenomena and to articulate the possibilities for contemporary collectivist art production." While the book lacks "a systematic debate on the differences between the collaborative and the collectivist," it is nevertheless "a very rich, but sometimes overdescriptive and overdetailed, survey of collectivist artistic action in all parts of the world (only China, the Islamic world and Australia are missing)."

=== Dark matter and the political economy of the art world ===
Sholette's art focuses on the forgotten, repressed or speculative genealogies of redundant, politically invisible cultural labor that actually maintains and reproduces the mainstream high art world marketplace. Sholette uses "dark matter" as a metaphor for these artistic practices and institutions, arguing that the visible, institutional art world is actually dependent on what it marginalizes and overshadows. He further developed this concept in Dark Matter: Art and Politics in the Age of Enterprise Culture (2010). This book engages with the mainstream conditions of the art system through the definition of what Sholette later describes in Delirium and Resistance (2017) as "bare art." Borrowing from Giorgio Agamben's notion of bare life "as the condition of bodies reduced to biological existence through being excluded from the category of political citizenship by the state," Sholette defines bare art as art deprived of any socially transformative capacity and dedicated to financial management and the reproduction of the status quo.

Theorist Marc James Léger describes Sholette's concept of artistic dark matter as "the work of autonomous and participatory cultural production by amateur, informal, unofficial, autonomous, activist and non-institutional workers." Susan Ryan, Professor of Art History at Louisiana State University, interprets the term as involving art "so embedded in reality that it is off the art radar." Art Historian Kuba Szreder at the Academy of Fine Arts in Warsaw writes that the "mock institutions" Sholette points to are "native to artistic dark matter—research institutes, informal universities, collectives of urban gardeners, tribes of survivalists, temporary service points—each of which tends to operate in an institutional landscape ravaged by hostile forces of late capitalism." Mockinstitutions mimic institutional structures as a form of critical reinvention, see for example the projects of artist Marina Naprushkina.

== Criticism of work ==
Artist David Beech at University of the Arts London writes that while Dark Matter "is an important and timely contribution," Sholette's economic arguments are flawed. For example, "there is a fundamental problem with" his “idea of an "art strike" because "[a]rt production is not wage labor." Richard Lloyd, associate professor of sociology at Vanderbilt University, observes that in Dark Matter "one strains…to find an alternative model for doing "art and politics in the age of enterprise culture," as suggested by Sholette's investigations and lived experience as a politically conscious and apparently marginal artist (thus part of the dark matter)." Lloyd further states that Sholette's depiction of his own projects "is impersonal—there is no first-person reflection on these projects or their efficacy, though one can glean ambivalence in his depictions of how easily these moments of aesthetic resistance are ultimately absorbed by the neoliberal system." Ultimately, Lloyd critically points out that "it becomes questionable whether the most prominent of these political interventions should be classed in the dark matter at all, or whether they form another sort of illuminated sphere among the art worlds."

In 2017 Sholette published Delirium and Resistance: Activist Art and the Crisis of Capitalism, in which he argues that art has become simultaneously part of the increasing financialization of everything under neoliberal capitalism and a valuable resource for civic mobilization and progressive social transformation. A key concept that ties Dark Matter to Delirium and Resistance is Sholette's suggestion that society has entered a world of Bare Art. Social and cultural anthropologist Gretchen Coombs asserts that Sholette uses the terms "art and activism," "social practice," and "socially engaged" interchangeably, and while he "works out these differences through his case studies…these terms often function on different registers, specifically as they are understood in our globalized world." The book's focus on New York also "casts a specter across the book's historical arc, effectively provincializing what needs to be deprovincialized."

Sholette has sought to expand his scope of practice and study outside of New York. In 2019, he guest edited a special double issue of FIELD titled Art, Anti-Globalism, and the Neo-Authoritarian turn, which reports on the rise of ultra-nationalism/authoritarianism from 30 different nations. His most recent book, The Activism of Art and the Art of Activism (2022), covers South America, Serbia, Afghanistan, Hong Kong, Syria and other locations in addition to the US and Europe in a brief overview of protest aesthetics, and made it into the list of The Art Newspaper's top art books of 2022. However, art critic and editor J.J. Charlesworth at ArtReview writes that the book does not address "the ambiguities of demanding that 'high culture' be abolished while its institutions remain, and in effect get taken over by progressive artists-as-activists."

== Other select work ==
=== Publications ===
The Art of Activism and the Activism of Art (London: Lund Humphries, 2022).

Art As Social Action: An Introduction to the Principles & Practices of Teaching Social Practice Art (co-edited with Chloë Bass, Skyworth/Allworth Press, 2018).

Merciless Aesthetic/Nemilosrdna estetika (WHW Press, Croatia, 2016).

It's the Political Economy, Stupid (co-edited with Oliver Ressler, Pluto Press, 2012).

=== Art projects ===
"Precarious Workers Pageant," a collaborative performance intervention carried out during the Venice Biennial on the evening of August 7, 2015 that consisted of a public procession staged in solidarity with migrant laborers working on Saadiyat Island in Abu Dhabi where a Frank Gehry designed Guggenheim Museum will soon be under construction. Venice, Italy with Queens College Social Practice Students/Alumni, 2015.

"Our Barricades," Station Independent Projects, a series of stark black and white bas-relief pieces graphically linking the oily materiality of street barricades to global petro-politics, the war on terror, and the need for an aesthetics of resistance, 2014.

"15 Islands for Robert Moses," a site-specific project in the Panorama of the City of New York, which was originally built for the 1964 World's Fair by urban planner Robert Moses. The project placed new islands around the Panorama's waterways based on proposals by Larry Bogad, Marc Fischer, Aaron Gach/Center for Tactical Magic, Ann Messner, Ted Purves, Rasha Salti, Dread Scott, Libertad Guerra, Dara Greenwald, Marisa Jahn, and several others who Sholette invited to respond to the prompt, "If you could add an island to New York City, what would that new landmass be like?" Queens Museum, 2012.
