= Özmen =

Özmen is a Turkish surname. Notable people with the surname include:

- Atilla Özmen (born 1988), Turkish footballer
- Emin Özmen
- Eren Özmen
- Selahattin Özmen
- Şener Özmen
- Sezer Özmen (born 1992), Turkish footballer
