= Sarah Johnston =

Sarah Johnston may refer to:

- Sarah Mitchell (born 1982), née Johnston, Australian politician
- Sarah Iles Johnston (born 1957), American academic studying ancient Greek myths and religion

== See also ==
- Sarah Johnson (disambiguation)
