= Yves Netzhammer =

Swiss artist (born 1970)

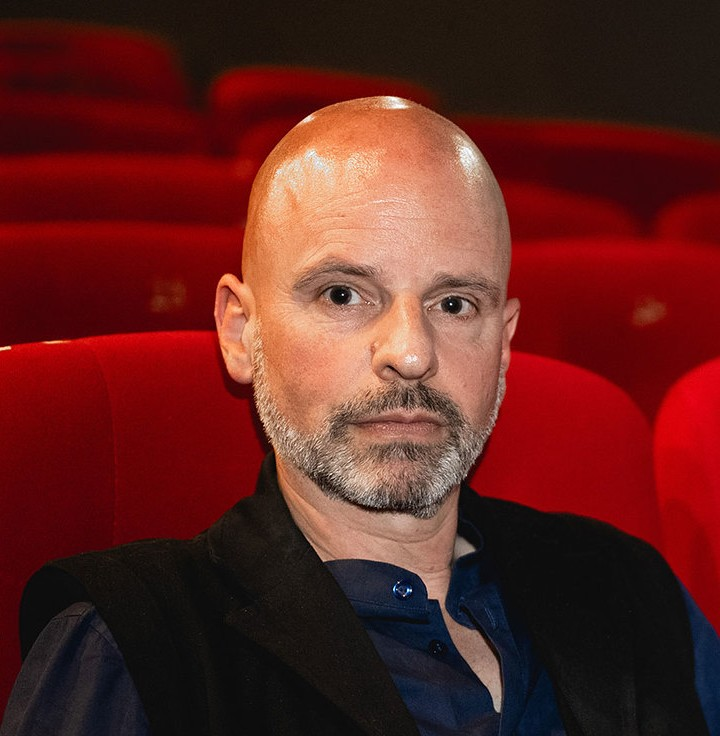
- Netzhammer at the Annecy International Animation Film Festival in 2024
- Born: 1 August 1970 (age 56); Affoltern am Albis, Canton of Zurich, Switzerland
- Known for: Drawing, animation, video, installation, object art
- Website: netzhammer.com

Yves Netzhammer (born 1 August 1970) is a Swiss artist who primarily works in drawing, animation, video, installation and object art. He represented Switzerland at the Venice Biennale in 2007 and took part in a related programme around documenta 12 later that year. In 2026, he received the Film Prize of the Basel region for his first feature-length film, Reise der Schatten.

== Biography ==
Yves Netzhammer was born on 1 August 1970 in Affoltern am Albis. He grew up in Trüllikon, Diessenhofen and Schaffhausen. From 1987 to 1990 he trained as an architectural draughtsman, and from 1991 to 1995 studied visual design at the Höhere Schule für Gestaltung in Zurich.

Netzhammer received the Manor Art Prize Schaffhausen in 1999 and a fine art grant from the City of Zurich in 2000. He was awarded the Swiss federal prize for fine art in 2000, 2002 and 2006. Between 1999 and 2005, his drawings were regularly published in the Tages-Anzeiger and Das Magazin.

In 2007, he represented Switzerland at the 52nd Venice Biennale, presenting work in the Swiss pavilion alongside Christine Streuli, Ugo Rondinone, and Urs Fischer.

== Work ==
Netzhammer works in drawing, animation, video, installation and object art. His work uses drawing and animation to explore the interaction between the individual and the surrounding world. The imagery features simplified, gender-neutral figures together with animals and familiar objects.

A pared-down visual style and continuously changing forms are recurring features of Netzhammer's work. In his installations, projected imagery is combined with objects and spatial structures to connect the digital work with the exhibition space. His work explores boundaries between self and other, including bodily vulnerability and the individual's relationship with nature.

In 2001, he co-designed a special-edition postage stamp made to look and smell like chocolate. According to the New York Times, "Each one resembles a block of chocolate in a bar and, when scratched, smells chocolaty; although Swiss Post rejected a proposal to make the stamps taste like chocolate too."

Netzhammer began creating installations incorporating film and objects in 1999. At exhibitions at the Helmhaus in Zurich and the Württembergischer Kunstverein in Stuttgart in 2003, he used several coordinated large-scale projections. In 2007, Netzhammer also participated in the accompanying programme of documenta 12. In 2008, he had a solo exhibition at the San Francisco Museum of Modern Art. In 2010, Kunstmuseum Bern presented his first major solo exhibition at a Swiss art museum. By that year, his installations were making greater use of staging, reflections and interventions in the exhibition space to involve the viewer more directly.

He created Das gemeinsame Ziel vorbeiziehender Formen (2010) for the Aargauer Kunsthaus exhibition Voici un dessin suisse. 1990–2010. The installation extended drawing beyond the framed page into three-dimensional space, using cord, structural elements and objects as part of the composition.

In Das Kind der Säge ist das Brett, Netzhammer brought together three-channel video, freestanding black-and-white structures, selected works from the museum collection and black geometric wall paintings. The installation drew on Constructivist and Concrete art, with references that included Kazimir Malevich's Black Square. Netzhammer introduced kinetic objects into his practice for a Schaffhausen exhibition in 2018.

In 2025, Kunsthaus Zurich paired his work with that of Wilhelm Lehmbruck in an exhibition centred on human vulnerability. In 2026, Netzhammer received the Film Prize of the Basel region for Reise der Schatten, his first feature-length film, an experimental animation examining what it means to be human in a technological age.
