= Andrew Ross (sociologist) =

Scottish sociologist (born 1956)

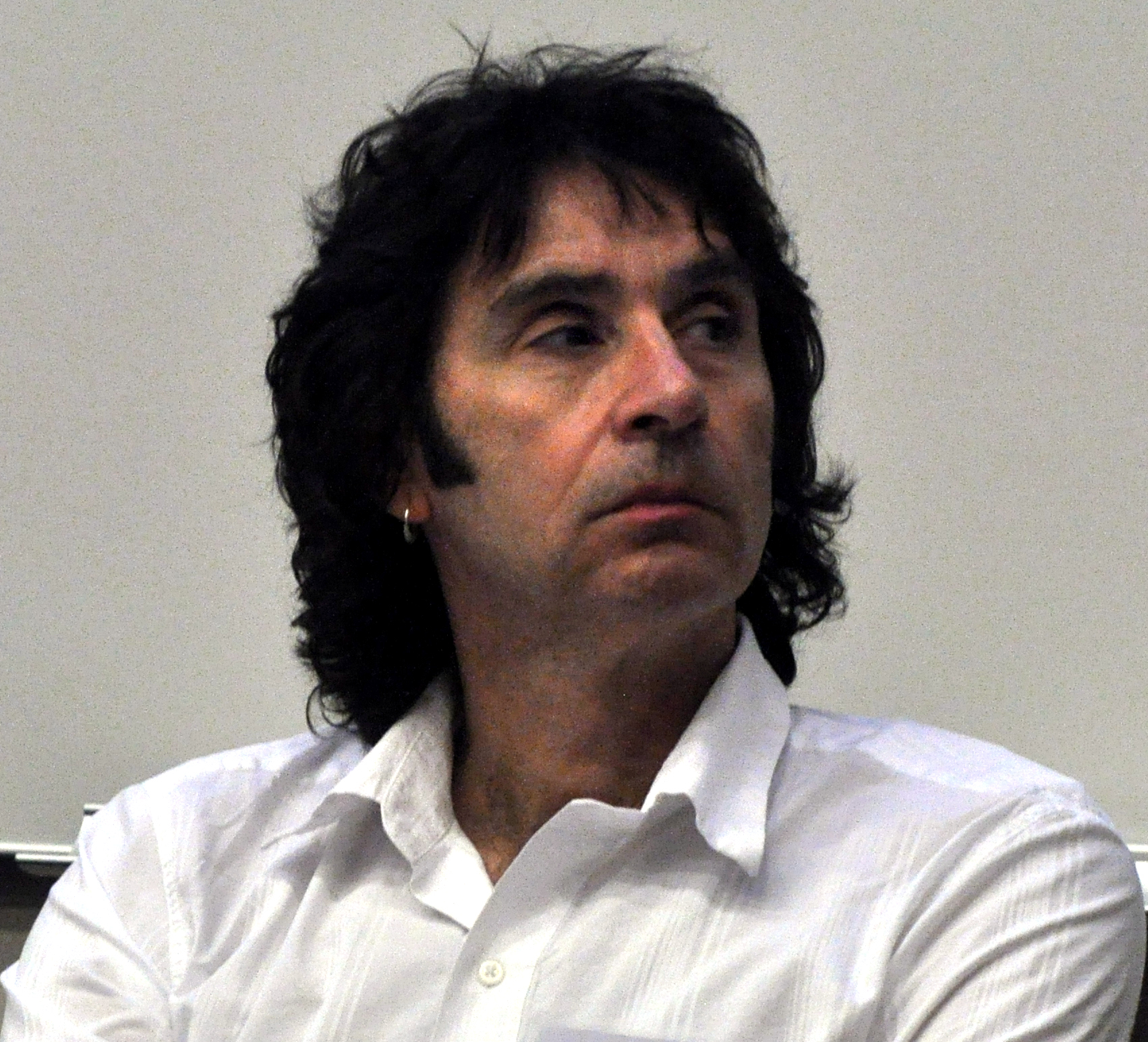
- Ross in 2012
- Born: 1956 (age 69–70); Scotland
- Citizenship: United Kingdom
- Education: University of Aberdeen; University of Kent
- Website: www.andrewtross.com

Andrew Ross (born 1956), a Scottish-born social activist and analyst, is Professor of Social and Cultural Analysis at New York University (NYU). He has authored and edited numerous books, and written for The New York Times, The Guardian, The Nation, Newsweek, and Al Jazeera. Much of his writing focuses on labor, the urban environment, and the organisation of work, from the Western world of business and high-technology to conditions of offshore labour in the Global South. Making use of social theory as well as ethnography, his writing questions the human and environmental cost of economic growth.

== Life and education ==
Ross was born and educated in the Lowlands of Scotland. After graduating from the University of Aberdeen in 1978, he worked in the North Sea oil fields. He received his Ph.D. from the University of Kent at Canterbury in 1984. He joined the faculty at Princeton University in 1985, and left in 1993 to become Director of the Graduate Program in American Studies at NYU. He was the recipient of a Guggenheim fellowship in 2001–2002. and has held research positions at Cornell University and Shanghai University.

== Early writing ==
His doctoral dissertation, about modern American poetry, was published as The Failure of Modernism in 1986. Several subsequent books (No Respect: Intellectuals and Popular Culture; Strange Weather: Culture, Science, and Technology in the Age of Limits; and The Chicago Gangster Theory of Life: Nature's Debt to Society) established his reputation as one of the leading practitioners of cultural studies, particularly in the fields of popular culture, ecology, and the history of technology.

== Later writing ==
Increasingly, his writing focused on urban sociology, labour, and the organisation of work. A scholar and activist associated with the anti-sweatshop movement, he published No Sweat: Fashion, Free Trade, and the Rights of Garment Workers in 1998 and Low Pay, High Profile: The Global Push for Fair Labor in 2002. In 1997, he took up residence for a year in Disney's new town of Celebration, Florida, and wrote The Celebration Chronicles, based on his participant observation of the town's residents, the first ethnography of a New Urbanist community.

Two further books were based on field work with employees: No-Collar: The Humane Workplace and Its Hidden Costs, about employees in Internet companies during the New Economy boom and bust, and Fast Boat to China: Corporate Flight and the Consequences of Free Trade, about skilled Chinese employees of foreign firms in Shanghai and other Yangtze Delta cities. The latter book, written on the ground in China, is a frank alternative to Thomas Friedman's pro-outsourcing views on corporate globalisation. In 2009, Ross published Nice Work If You Can Get It: Life and Labor in Precarious Times, an analysis of changing patterns in the nature of creative work and contingent employment.

In several of his books, Ross has developed a method he calls Scholarly Reporting, which is a blend of ethnography and investigative journalism. In Bird on Fire: Lessons from the World's Least Sustainable City, Ross draws on his fieldwork in Phoenix, Arizona. Focusing on areas such as water supply, metropolitan growth, renewable energy, downtown revitalisation, immigration policy, and patterns of pollution, the book argues that urban managers have to base policy on combating environmental injustices to avoid replicating the condition of eco-apartheid that prevails in Phoenix and other major urban areas.

One of his books, Creditocracy and the Case for Debt Refusal, analyses, and proposes solutions to, the massive household debt burden that has accumulated over the last two decades. The book considers some of the legal and moral principles of the Jubilee South movement–aimed at repudiating external debts of developing countries–and adapts them to the situation of household debtors in the North. Creditocracy engages with ideas and actions from the Occupy movement of debt resistance to Wall Street's creditor class.

In Richard Posner's 2003 study, Public Intellectuals: A Study of Decline, Ross was ranked among the top 100 public intellectuals in the US.

From 1986 to 2000, Ross served on the editorial collective of Duke University Press's journal Social Text. In 1996 the journal published a paper by Alan Sokal professing to show connections between physics and post-modern theory, which was later revealed by Sokal to be a hoax meant to expose the low academic standards of "post-modernism" (see Sokal affair). Social Text was awarded the 1996 Ig Nobel Prize for Literature for being taken in by the hoax.

One of Ross's books, Stone Men: The Palestinians Who Built Israel, tells the story of the Palestinian stone industry, along with its stonemasons and construction workers. Based on extensive field interviews, the book documents the conditions and challenges of workers in quarries and factories in the West Bank and it follows their movement across the Green Line to work on Israeli construction sites. Stone Men won the Palestine Book Award for Social History in 2019. Adam Hanieh, reviewing the book in the Journal of Palestine Studies, called the book "a significant contribution to an emerging literature on Palestinian labor", praising its examination of the stone industry as a critical lens.

In his book, Sunbelt Blues: The Failure of American Housing, he assesses the national housing crisis through the lens of Central Florida, one of the most difficult places for low income people to find affordable housing. Taking up residence in the region's budget motels, where a variety of households live in a permanent basis, he reports on the challenges faced by residents in these single room domiciles, as well as in tent encampments in the woods.

In 2015, Ross helped to launch NYU's Prison Education Program Research Lab, and he is its current director. The Lab's faculty and formerly incarcerated students do research on carceral debt. His latest book, Cars and Jails: Freedom Dreams, Debt, and Carcerality (co-authored with Julie Livingston) investigates the overlap between auto debt and carceral debt, generated by predatory policing and predatory lending respectively.

== Activism ==
Ross has been active in the anti-sweatshop movement since the mid-1990s. From the late 1990s, he has turned his attention to the academic labour movement, both in the national AAUP, and at NYU as a vocal supporter of the graduate student union, and as a founding member of Faculty Democracy. In 2007, his co-edited volume, The University Against Itself, documented and analysed the long strike at NYU in 2005 by GSOC-UAW (The Graduate Student Organizing Committee).

Ross has been critical of labor conditions in Abu Dhabi and similar fast-growth environments for a number of years. A founder of the Gulf Labor Coalition, he has helped organize campaigns to raise migrant labour standards in the United Arab Emirates. He has been a vocal critic of labour abuse at the NYU Abu Dhabi construction site. In 2015, he edited an anthology of art and writing from Gulf Labor entitled, The Gulf: High Culture/Hard Labor. His activism resulted in his being banned entry into the UAE by the government

An early participant in Occupy Wall Street, he helped found the Occupy Student Debt Campaign and has been an integral member of the Occupy Debt Assembly and Strike Debt—a coalition formed in the summer of 2012 to help build a debtors' movement. Strike Debt produced the Debt Resisters' Operations Manual and organised the Rolling Jubilee. He is an active member of the Debt Collective, a prototype debtors' union. He also serves on the board of the US Campaign for the Academic and Cultural Boycott of Israel (USACBI).

In November 2023, three Jewish students filed a law suit against NYU. The lawsuit named Ross, accusing him of antisemitism for speaking at the Walkout for Solidarity with Palestine, establishing NYU’s chapter of Faculty for Justice in Palestine and being a long-time supporter of the Boycott, Divestment and Sanctions movement. Ross asked to be included in the lawsuit as a 3rd party defendant. On December 12, 2024, Ross was arrested outside of NYU's Bobst Library for trespassing as he protested against the Gaza war. Ross was declared PNG (persona non grata) by the university and barred entry into some of the buildings on campus.

== Books ==
- Cars and Jails: Freedom Dreams, Debt, and Carcerality (OR Books, 2022, with Julie Livingston)
- Sunbelt Blues: The Failure of American Housing (2021)
- Under Conditions Not of Our Choosing: Thoughts One Can't Do Without (2020)
- Stone Men: The Palestinians Who Built Israel (Verso Books, 2019)
- Creditocracy and the Case for Debt Refusal (OR Books, 2014)
- The Exorcist and the Machines (Kassel, Documenta, 2012)
- Bird on Fire: Lessons from the World's Least Sustainable City (Oxford University Press, 2011)
- Nice Work If You Can Get It: Life and Labor in Precarious Times (NYU Press, 2009)
- Fast Boat to China: Corporate Flight and the Consequences of Free Trade – Lessons from Shanghai (Pantheon, 2006, Paperback edition, Vintage, 2007)
- Low Pay, High Profile: The Global Push for Fair Labor (New Press, 2004)
- No-Collar: The Humane Workplace and its Hidden Costs (Basic Books, 2003) (Paperback edition, Temple University Press, 2004)
- The Celebration Chronicles: Life, Liberty, and The Pursuit of Property Value in Disney's New Town (New York: Ballantine, 1999) (London, Verso, 2000)
- Real Love: In Pursuit of Cultural Justice (NYU Press, 1998)
- The Chicago Gangster Theory of Life: Nature's Debt to Society (Verso, 1994)
- Strange Weather: Culture, Science and Technology in the Age of Limits (Verso, 1991)
- No Respect: Intellectuals and Popular Culture (Routledge, 1989)
- The Failure of Modernism: Symptoms of American Poetry (Columbia University Press, 1986)

== Edited books ==
- Co-editor (with A.J. Bauer, Cristina Beltran, and Rana Jaleel) Is This What Democracy Looks Like? (Social Text Periscope e-book, 2012)
- Co-editor (with Monika Krause, Michael Palm, and Mary Nolan), The University Against Itself: The NYU Strike and the Future of the Academic Workplace (Temple University Press, 2007)
- Co-Editor (With Kristin Ross) Anti-Americanism (New York University Press, 2004)
- Editor, No Sweat: Fashion, Free Trade, and the Rights of Garment Workers (Verso, 1997)
- Editor, Science Wars (Duke Univ. Press, 1996)
- Co-Editor (with Tricia Rose) Microphone Fiends: Youth Music and Youth Culture (Routledge, 1994)
- Co-Editor (with Constance Penley) Technoculture (University of Minnesota Press, 1991)
- Editor, Universal Abandon? The Politics of Postmodernism (University of Minnesota Press, 1988)
