= Gulf Labor =

U.S-based artist and activist coalition

- Formation: 2011
- Type: Activist group, coalition
- Location: New York, United States
- Affiliations: Occupy Museums

The Gulf Labor Coalition or Gulf Labor (also Gulf Labour) is the name of a coalition of artists and activists founded in 2011 and based in New York, United States, organized to bring awareness to issues surrounding the living and working conditions of migrant laborers responsible for building the Guggenheim Abu Dhabi, Louvre Abu Dhabi, and Sheikh Zayed Palace Museum on Abu Dhabi's Saadiyat Island, United Arab Emirates, along with other buildings on the island including a New York University Abu Dhabi campus.

== Overview ==
The group seeks to call attention to increasing influx of foreign workers into Abu Dhabi from Nepal, Sri Lanka, Pakistan, India and Bangladesh, the low pay and inadequate housing conditions given to these migrant workers, the corrupt and misleading practices of labor recruiters, and growing economic and class divides in Abu Dhabi. The Groups's concern with housing conditions of Saadiyat Island's migrant workers was centered around criticism of the Saadiyat Accommodation Village compound, which can hold up to 20,000 workers. The group circulates petitions related to workers' rights.

Members of the group's core organizing committee include Haig Aivazian, Ayreen Anastas, Doug Ashford, Doris Bittar, Sam Durant, Rene Gabri, Hans Haacke, Guy Mannes-Abbott, Michael Rakowitz, Walid Raad, Andrew Ross, Gregory Sholette, Ashok Sukumaran, Shaina Anand, Mariam Ghani, Naeem Mohaiemen, Tania Bruguera, Rene Gabri, Nitasha Dhillon, Amin Husain, Paula Chakravartty, and Noah Fischer. Gulf Labor includes affiliated offshoot groups, including G.U.L.F. (Gulf Ultra Luxury Faction), Occupy Museums, and Who Builds Your Museum?

Another affiliate of Gulf Labor is Gulf Labor West, based in California, whose exhibit, "Labor Migrant Gulf", was part of 52 Weeks.

== Reports ==
- "Building Towers, Cheating Workers", Human Rights Watch. November 12, 2006.
- "The Island of Happiness: Exploitation of Migrant Workers on Saadiyat Island, Abu Dhabi". Human Rights Watch. May 19, 2009.
- "Labor Camps in the Gulf States". Middle East Institute. February 2, 2010.
- "The Arab World's Forgotten Rebellions: Foreign Workers and Biopolitics in the Gulf" Kanna, Ahmed. Samar Magazine. May, 2011.
- "Dhaka Principles for Migration with Dignity". Institute for Human Rights & Business. May, 2011.
- "The Island of Happiness Revisited". Human Rights Watch. March 21, 2012.
- Monitoring report on labor conditions in Saadiyat Island. Gulf Labor. April, 2014.
- "Labor Conditions at N.Y.U.'s Abu Dhabi Campus to Be Investigated by U.S. Firm". The New York Times. June 26, 2014.

== Actions ==
- On November 5, 2014, 2014, Gulf Labor offshoot G.U.L.F. unfurls a three-story banner in the Solomon R. Guggenheim Museum.
- On February 22, 2014, dropped leaflets and educational materials from the Solomon R. Guggenheim Museum's rotunda and hung a manifesto on a lower wall.
- On March 29, 2014, demonstrators from the Gulf Labor Coalition offshoot Global Ultra Luxury Faction repeated the February action, dropping mock dollar bills from the Solomon R. Guggenheim Museum's rotunda. The bills contain illustrations of the Guggenheim in Abu Dhabi surrounded by American dollars.
- On May 8, 2015, Gulf Labor and other arts groups, including Venice-based groups, Sale Docks and Macao, occupied Venice's Peggy Guggenheim Collection. This action was the first marking Gulf Labor's participation in the 2015 Venice Biennial for Okwui Enwezor's exhibition, "All the World's Futures".
