= Sarah Johnson =

Sarah Johnson may refer to:

- Sarah Johnson (poet) (born 1980), South African poet
- Sarah Anne Johnson (born 1976), Canadian artist
- Sarah Johnson (Mount Vernon) (1844–1920), raised in slavery at Mount Vernon and then emancipated
- Sarah Stewart Johnson, American biologist, geochemist, astronomer and planetary scientist
- Sarah Johnson (swimmer) (born 1992), Northern Mariana Islands swimmer who participated in Swimming at the 2007 World Aquatics Championships – Women's 400 metre freestyle
- Sarah Marie Johnson (born 1987), American teenager convicted in the murders of Diane and Alan Scott Johnson, her parents
- Sarah Johnson Cocke (1865–1944), née Johnson, American writer and civic leader

== See also ==
- Sarah Johnston
