= Atilla Özmen =

Turkish footballer

Personal information
- Date of birth: 11 May 1988 (age 38)
- Place of birth: Ayvalık, Turkey
- Height: 1.89 m (6 ft 2 in)
- Position: Goalkeeper

Team information
- Current team: Isparta 32 SK
- Number: 88

Youth career
- 1998–2002: Küçükköy Belediye
- 2003–2004: İnegölspor
- 2004–2007: Altay

Senior career*
Years	Team	Apps	(Gls)
2005–2007	Altay	11	(0)
2007–2008	→ Beşiktaş (loan)	0	(0)
2008–2009	Konyaspor	0	(0)
2009–2011	Bucaspor	14	(0)
2011–2014	Samsunspor	13	(0)
2014–2015	Gaziantep BB	5	(0)
2015–2016	İnegölspor	10	(0)
2016–2022	Balıkesirspor	80	(0)
2022–	Isparta 32 SK	0	(0)

International career
2007	Turkey U19	4	(0)
- * Club domestic league appearances and goals as of 23 October 2022

Atilla Özmen (born 11 May 1988) is a Turkish footballer who plays as a goalkeeper for TFF Second League club Isparta 32 SK.

== Career ==
A native of Ayvalık, a seaside town in Balıkesir Province on Turkey's northwestern Aegean coast, Atilla Özmen played football since childhood and, in 1998, at the age of 10, was already a regular at Istanbul youth club, Küçükköy Belediye, where he remained until 2002, when a move, for the 2003–04 season, was arranged to İnegölspor club in nearby Bursa. The following three seasons (2004–07) were spent at İzmir's club Altay S.K., which has the same jersey colours (black and white) and with which he maintained good relations. In 2007, he was one of the players traded between Altay and Beşiktaş on loan. For Bank Asya 1. Lig 2008–09, he joined Altay back again.

Spelled his time at Altay and Konyaspor respectively, he joined another İzmir team Bucaspor, promoted Süper Lig in June 2010.

Following Bucaspor's relegation from Süper Lig, Atilla moved to Samsunspor on 14 July 2011, signing a three-year deal.

He signed for Gaziantep Büyükşehir Belediyespor on 1 July 2014.
