= Carter Mull =

American artist working in Los Angeles (born 1977)

Carter Mull (born 1977 in Atlanta, Georgia) is an American artist working in Los Angeles. Mull took his BFA in Painting from Rhode Island School of Design in 2000 and MFA from California Institute of the Arts in 2006. Fluency across mediums, collaboration, and material production engender the work of Carter Mull. Reflecting critically on the decentralization of mass communication by establishing speculative archives within his own prodigious output, Mull performs multiple roles within culture at large engaging both the production and the circulation of images. From painter and photographer, to collector and curator, to designer and publisher, Mull's practice treats the boundaries around segments of culture like parts of a montage, to be at times delineated, and at other times joined in an illicit union. Working from a deep history of artists who deal with the image on theoretical terms, his artistic language takes into account the social drive and dimension of the contemporary subject. Sensitive to the relationship between time and subjectivity, his project speaks to the basic units by which we trade personal desires and emotional responses.

His work is in the collections of the Walker Art Center, the UCLA Hammer Museum, the Orange County Museum of Art, the Whitney Museum of American Art, The Museum of Modern Art, the Whitney Museum of American Art, the UCLA Hammer Museum, The Getty Research Institute and the Museum of Contemporary Art, Los Angeles. His practice has been discussed in publications and periodicals, including Artforum, Art on Paper, Art In America, The Los Angeles Times and The New Yorker.

== Images ==
- Los Angeles Times Tuesday, August 5, 2008. 2008-09
- Eleven. 2009
