= Christine Streuli =

Swiss-born contemporary artist (born 1975)

- Born: 23 July 1975 (age 51); Bern, Switzerland
- Occupation: Artist
- Website: http://christinestreuli.ch/

Christine Streuli (born 23 July 1975) is a Swiss-born contemporary artist who lives and works in Berlin, Germany.

== Biography ==
Streuli grew up in Switzerland in Zurich and in Langenthal and in the US in Chicago. From 1997 to 2001 she studied at the Zurich University of the Arts and at the Berlin University of the Arts. Since 2015, she has been a professor at the Berlin University of the Arts.

== Work ==
Streuli became known for her large-format, colorful and ornamental paintings which were often described as colour manifestos, inspired by the most diverse cultural sources, which the artist combines to form a dense cosmos. Her paintings are composed of several layers, whereby the artist makes use of the most diverse painting techniques. Streuli rarely works with the brush; rather, she sprinkles, pours or sprays paint onto her canvases and combines a variety of printing techniques. She uses rakes, stencils, scratches or other objects. Often she chooses a garish, almost excessive colourfulness. Her works are usually characterized by room-filling stagings in which the painting radiates beyond the edges of canvases and extends over the walls, floor and ceiling.

Streuli's works have been exhibited worldwide, including the Venice Biennale in 2007 and the Biennale of Sydney in 2014. Her work has been shown in solo exhibitions in art museums including Aargauer Kunsthaus, Kunsthaus Langenthal, Kunstmuseum Luzern, Kunstmuseum Bonn, the Haus am Waldsee in Berlin and in the Berlinischen Galerie.

== Bibliography (selected) ==
- Lange Arme, kurze Beine. Christine Streuli, exh. cat. Kunstmuseum Thun, ed. by Kunstmuseum Thun, Helen Hirsch, texts by Helen Hirsch, Bettina Steinbrügge, Naoko Mabon, including an artist statement by Christine Streuli, VfmK Verlag für moderne Kunst GmbH, Vienna 2020, ISBN 978-3-903320-61-1
- Daniel Morgenthaler, »Christine Streuli – Deus ex Pictura«, in: Kunstbulletin, 5/2019 / Mai 2019, S. / pp. 48–51
- Fred Thieler Preis 2017. Christine Streuli, exh. Cat. Berlinische Galerie, ed. by Berlinische Galerie – Landesmuseum für Moderne Kunst, Fotografie und Architektur, with a foreword by Dr. Thomas Köhler and a text by Dr. Tobia Bezzola, Berlin 2017, ISBN 978-3-940208-49-1.
- Miriam Wiesel, »Christine Streuli – Warpaintings«, in: Kunstbulletin, 5/2017 / May 2017, S. / pp. 88–89
- Gabi Czöppan, »Interview mit Christine Streuli«, in: H.O.M.E., 2017, S. / pp. 152–155
- Vitamin P3: New Perspectives in Painting, ed. by Phaidon Press 2016, with text by Michele Robecchi, Phaidon Press, London/ New York 2016, ISBN 978-0-7148-7145-5
- Off the Wall, exh. Cat. Kunsthalle Nürnberg, ed. by Kunsthalle Nürnberg, with texts by Harriet Zilch, Daniel Scheiber, Kristin Schmidt, Gregor Jansen, Romana Heinlein, Christian Egger, Verlag für moderne Kunst, Nürnberg 2014, ISBN 978-3-86984-502-9
- 19th Biennale of Sydney 2014. You imagine what you desire, exh. Cat. ed. by 19th Biennale of Sydney 2014, ISBN 978-0-9578023-1-5
- Nonstoppainting. Christine Streuli, exh. Cat. Haus am Waldsee Berlin, ed. by Dr. Katja Blomberg, Berlin, with texts by Katja Blomberg, Barbara von Flüe, Walther König Verlag, Köln 2014, ISBN 978-3-86335-472-5
- Christine Streuli, Fanni Fetzer (Hrsg.), Terry R. Myers, Michele Robecchi: CS. Christine Streuli. Kunstmuseum Luzern, 2013, ISBN 978-3-7757-3555-1.
- Sven Drühl, »Neue Abstraktion in der aktuellen Malerei, Christine Streuli«, in: Kunstforum International, 206, 2011, S. / p. 70
- Konrad Tobler, »Christine Streuli«, in: Künstler – Kritisches Lexikon der Gegenwartskunst, 93, 7, München / Munich 2011
- Wir sind Orient. Zeitgenössische Arabesken, exh. cat. Museum Marta Herford, Herford hrsg. ed. by Museum Marta Herford 2011
- Felicità. Freude, Glück und Emotionen in der zeitgenössischen Kunst, exh. cat. CentrePasquArt, Biel, Verlag für moderne Kunst Nürnberg 2010, ISBN 978-3-86984-120-5
- Stefan Wagner, »Interview mit Christine Streuli«, in: Artcollector, 3, 2010, S. / pp. 30–33
- Im Schatten der Pyramiden. Kunstschaffende aus der Schweiz in Kairo, exh. cat. Haus für Kunst Uri, Uri 2009
- Boden und Wand / Wand und Fenster / Zeit, exh. cat. Helmhaus Zürich, ed. by Roman Kurzmeyer, Edition Fink Zürich / Zurich 2009, ISBN 978-3-03746-136-5
- Christine Streuli. Fusion Food, Ausst.-Kat. / exh. cat. Aargauer Kunsthaus, Aarau, with an essay by Stefan Kunz, Aarau, 2008
- Album – On and Around. Urs Fischer, Yves Netzhammer, Ugo Rondinone, and Christine Streuli, Participating at the 52nd Venice Biennale 2007, ed. by Daniel Kurjakovic, Bundesamt für Kultur, Bern & Zürich, 2007, ISBN 978-3-905770-70-4
- Christine Streuli, Hendrik Schwantes (Hrsg.), Beat Wismer, Roman Kurzmeyer: Christine Streuli: colour distance, Swiss Pavilion at the 52nd Biennale in Venice. Eigenverlag, Burgdorf 2007.
- Christine Streuli, Fanni Fetzer (Hrsg.): Christine Streuli. Erholungsgebiet 1–16. Kunsthaus Langenthal 2007, ISBN 978-3-905817-01-0.
- Heinz-Norbert Jocks, »Entweder Rot oder Gelb. Interview mit Christine Streuli«, in: Kunstforum International, 188, 2007, S. / pp. 190–194
- Claudia Spinelli, »Es geht um Behauptungen und Sich-Behaupten-Können«, in: Kunstbulletin, 6, Juni / June 2007, S. / pp. 42–51
- Christine Streuli, Hendrik Schwantes (Hrsg.), Isabel Zürcher, Madeleine Schuppli, Roman Kurzmeyer: Christine Streuli: Bumblebeee. Verlag für moderne Kunst, Nürnberg 2006, ISBN 978-3-938821-66-4.
- Bruno Steiger, »Ein Bild wie Weihnachten in Las Vegas. Christine Streulis Jackpot«, in: Du, 5, Juni / June 2006, S. / pp. 20–21
- Beat Wismer, »Die Schatten des Hintergrundes, oder: Malerei als latenter Ort, in dem die Bilder aufgehoben sind«, in: Dorothea-von-Stetten-Kunstpreis 2004, exh. cat. Kunstmuseum Bonn, Bonn 2004, S. / pp. 92–111
