= Christine Tohmé =

Lebanese curator, visual artist, video and film producer (born 1964)

Christine Tohme (Arabic: كريستين طعمة) is a Lebanese curator and the founding director of Ashkal Alwan - The Lebanese Association for Plastic Arts. Since its establishment in 1993, Ashkal Alwan has been committed to contemporary artistic practice, production, research and education.

== Biography ==
Tohme was born on February 28, 1964, in Beirut, where she continues to live and work. She received her BA in English literature from the American University of Beirut (1984) and her MA in Contemporary Art Theory from Goldsmiths, University of London (2007).

From 1988 to 2006 she worked for Radio Liban as a presenter and DJ. She is the founder of Ashkal Alwan, the Lebanese Association for Plastic Arts, established in 1993.

In 2001, Tohme initiated Home Works: A Forum on Cultural Practices, of which 8 editions have taken place to date. Home Works Forum is a multidisciplinary platform that takes place in Beirut, Lebanon every 2–3 years and has evolved into one of the most vibrant platforms for contemporary cultural practices in the Arab region and internationally. Artists, curators, writers, thinkers, and cultural practitioners gather to share their works, which take the form of exhibitions, lectures, panels, artists’ talks, screenings, workshops and publications, as well as theatre, dance and music performances. In parallel, Tohme launched The Home Workspace Program, a 10-month arts study program that enrolls 10-15 fellows per year, open to artists and cultural practitioners from Lebanon and the world over to develop their formal, technical and theoretical skills in a critical setting. HWP was initially developed to explore free, trans-disciplinary, critical models of arts education in Lebanon and the Arab region where education is mostly privatized. Moreover, it aims to include a wide range of practitioners and guest teachers, all the while addressing geopolitical particularities, and existing conditions in art and the educational landscape.

In 2017, she curated Sharjah Biennial 13: Tamawuj. The biennial unfolded in five parts, from October 2016 to October 2017, and included exhibitions and a public program in two acts in Sharjah and Beirut; a year-long education program in Sharjah; off-site projects in Dakar, Istanbul, Ramallah and Beirut; and an online publishing platform, tamawuj.org.

Tohme is also on the boards of Marsa, a sexual health centre in Beirut that provides specialized medical services for at-risk youth and marginalised communities, Afterall: A Journal of Art, Context and Enquiry, and Haven for Artists, a Beirut-based non-governmental organization and arts collective.

== Prizes and awards ==
In recognition of her achievements in supporting local art production and criticism, Tohme has received the Prince Claus Award (2006), CCS Bard Audrey Irmas Award for Curatorial Excellence (2015), UNESCO-Sharjah Prize for Arab Culture (2018), and La Medaille de l’Ordre des Arts et des Lettres au grade du Chevalier by the French Ministry of Culture (2021).
