= Chloë Bass =

American artist

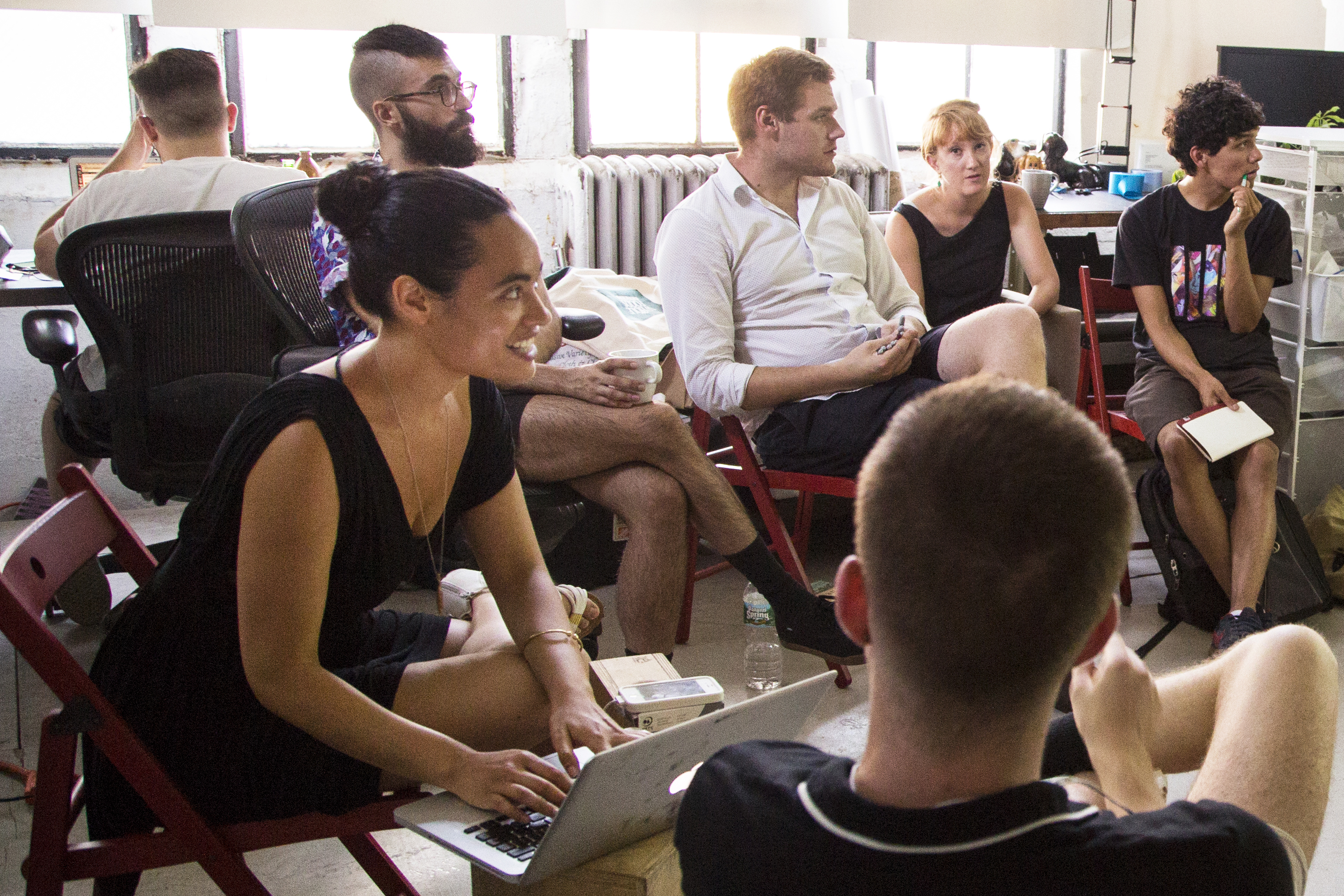
- Bass meets with the New York Arts Practicum, 2013
- Born: 1984 (age 41–42); Manhattan
- Organizations: Queens College, Social Practice Queens, Social Practice CUNY, CUNY Graduate Center
- Known for: Social Practice
- Spouse: James McNally
- Website: chloebass.com

Chloë Bass (born 1984) is an American conceptual artist who works in performance and social practice. Bass' work focuses on intimacy. She was a founding co-lead organizer of Arts in Bushwick from 2007 to 2011, the group that organizes Bushwick Open Studios. She is an Assistant Professor of Art and Social Practice at Queens College, CUNY, and holds a BA from Yale University and an MFA from Brooklyn College. Bass was a regular contributor to Hyperallergic until 2018. She is represented by Alexander Gray Associates.

== Early life and education ==
Bass was born in New York City in 1984 and lived on the Upper West Side. In 2002, she moved to New Haven to pursue a BA in Theatre Studies at Yale University. Two labor strikes in 2003, including a dining hall workers' strike, strongly affected Bass' undergraduate experience and influenced her later involvement with organizing.

She completed her MFA in Performance and Interactive Media at Brooklyn College in 2011.

== Career ==
Bass moved to Bushwick in 2006. In Bushwick she became a co-lead organizer of Arts in Bushwick (2007-2011), and helped to organize Bushwick Open Studios, a project of which she is now critical, saying that "ultimately the damaging effect [of BOS] has been greater than the fun." While living in that part of Brooklyn in a loft, Bass worked to register the area's voters and, as a result of a displacement mapping project, gained a seat on Community Board 4, which she held until 2012.

In 2011, Bass moved to an apartment in Bed-Stuy, where she currently lives. In 2014 she was the Create Change resident for the Laundromat Project in Bed-Stuy, creating a work called The Department of Local Affairs. For this work she collected information in the form of writing, drawing, and conversation by and for locals, examining what this looked like in contrast to information collected by companies for advertising or tourism.

Bass' eight-chapter project from 2015 to 2017 exploring individual social interactions, The Book of Everyday Instruction, has been presented at the Museum of Modern Art (MoMA) and other venues. Chapters from this work have included creating poetic installations in bathrooms and inviting gallery goers to smell jars of spice. Her work has been exhibited at the Elizabeth Foundation for the Arts, Cooper Union, The Bronx Museum of the Arts, the Neuberger Museum of Art, The Knockdown Center, and Momenta Art, amongst other venues. She is the recipient of residencies at The Laundromat Project, Bemis Center, Triangle Arts Association, and Lower Manhattan Cultural Counsel (LMCC) Workspace residency, and was nominated for the Rema Hort Mann Foundation Grant.

In 2019 the Studio Museum in Harlem commissioned her first institutional solo exhibition, Wayfinding (2019) at St. Nicholas Park. She later toured the work nationally, and created a new site-specific section for Los Angeles' Skirball Cultural Center.
