= Pavel Wolberg =

Israeli photographer

Pavel Wolberg פאבל וולברג
- Born: 1966 (age 59–60)
- Known for: Visual artist, photographer, photojournalist
- Style: Photography
- Website: https://pavelwolbergimages.com/

Pavel Wolberg (Hebrew: פאבל וולברג; born 1966) is a visual artist, photographer, and photojournalist. He was born in Leningrad in the Soviet Union. He lives and works in Tel Aviv, Israel.

== Biography ==
At the age of 8, Pavel Wolberg moved to Israel from Leningrad (Saint Petersburg) with his mother and grandmother, and grew up in the southern town of Beersheba in the Negev desert. In 1994, Wolberg graduated in photography studies from the Camera Obscura School of Art in Tel Aviv. His first solo exhibition was shown in Herzliya Museum of Contemporary Art, 1995. Since then his works have been exhibited in museums and galleries worldwide, including solo shows in the Tel Aviv Museum of Art, the Jewish Museum, Berlin, the Jewish Museum (Manhattan), and George Eastman House, New York City. Wolberg has been represented for some time by the Dvir Art Gallery and by the Andrea Meislin gallery in New York. He participated in the 2007 Venice Biennale exhibition "Think With The Senses, Feel With the Mind", curated by Robert Storr. Wolberg has been awarded the Leon Constantiner Prize for Israeli Photography by the Tel Aviv Museum of Art in 2005 and received an award in the 2014 WPO-Sony World Photography Awards. Since 1997, he has worked for newspapers and news agencies such as Haaretz, the European Pressphoto Agency (EPA), and The New York Times. His works have been published in publications including Vogue (magazine), Stiletto, and Der Spiegel. Since 2010, Wolberg has been working as well on art projects in Ethiopia (the Bodi tribe), the Post-Soviet states such as Ukraine, and in Japan.

He photographs subjects such as war, terror, occupation, the army, intifada, ultra orthodox Judaism and Hasidic communities, and downtown Tel Aviv, usually in large or panoramic formats.

Lindsay Harris wrote in the catalogue of the 52 Venice Biennale: "In their poignant representation of potent, even unsettling imagery, Wolberg's photographs evoke the gritty drama of traditional photojournalism, such as the black-and-white wartime photographs of Robert Capa, Henri Cartier-Bresson and other members of Magnum Photos. Yet Wolberg's carefully composed images and refined treatment of light belie his artistic sensibility". "He is the witness I would have liked to have there instead of me", wrote Haaretz photographer Alex Levac. Uzi Zur wrote in Haaretz, 2007, "In the future Pavel Wolberg's masterpieces will be our chronicles". Micha Bar-Am, an Israel Prize laureate in photography, thinks that Wolberg "succeeds in demonstrating that news photography can become iconic photography".

== Awards ==
- 1997 - The Gérard Lévy Prize for a Young Photographer, Israel Museum, Jerusalem
- 2002 - Ministry of Science, Culture and the Sports Prize, Israel 2003 America Israel Cultural Foundation Prize
- 2005 - Leon Constantiner Prize for Israeli Photography, Tel Aviv Museum of Art
- 2011 - Sony World Photography Awards, WPO (World Photography Organisation) 2017 Prix Pictet, Finalist
