= Walid Raad =

Lebanese video artist

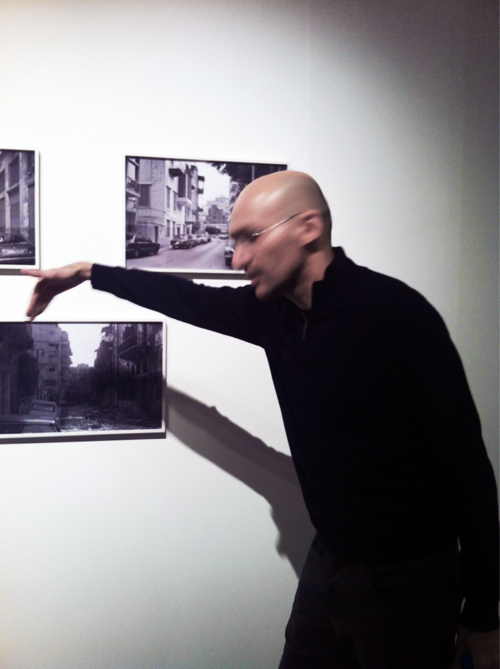
- Walid Raad showing and discussing his works at the Hasselblad Foundation in Gothenburg, Sweden, 2011
- Born: 1967 (age 58–59)
- Education: Rochester Institute of Technology, University of Rochester,
- Known for: Contemporary media

Walid Raad (Ra'ad) (Arabic: وليد رعد) (born 1967 in Chbanieh, Lebanon) is a contemporary media artist. The Atlas Group is a fictional collective, the work of which is produced by Walid Raad. He lives and works in New York, where he is currently a distinguished visiting professor of photography at Bard College, in addition to being a professor of photography at the Cooper Union School of Art.

His works to date include film, photography, multimedia installations, and accompanying public performances. All, in one way or another, deal with the contemporary history of Lebanon with particular emphasis on the Lebanese Civil War of 1975–90. The work is also often concerned with the representation of traumatic events of collective historical dimensions; and the ways film, video, and photography function as documents of physical and psychological violence. He is represented by Sfeir-Semler Gallery and is also a member of the Arab Image Foundation.

== Early life and education ==
Walid Raad was born in 1967 in Christian East Beirut to a Palestinian mother and a Lebanese father. Raad's dream was to become a photojournalist. It was his father who gave him his first camera and helped to create a home darkroom. Since his teen years Raad has been introduced to the photographic medium as well as European photography magazines such as Photo, Zoom, and Photo Reporter, where he saw the work of Eugène Atget, Henri Cartier-Bresson, Man Ray, Diane Arbus, and Helmut Newton.

Ra'ad had to leave Beirut in 1983 and relocate to the United States. He received his BFA from the Rochester Institute of Technology in 1989, where he continued focused study of photography. In addition to that he also started taking classes in Middle Eastern studies. He comments: "I never got to learn anything about the history of the Arab world, or the history of Lebanon in a serious way. That training was in the United States." He went on to complete his MA and Ph.D. in Visual and Cultural Studies at the University of Rochester in 1993 and 1996, respectively. He completed a dissertation based partly on writing by American and European hostages held in Lebanon in the 1980s during the country's civil wars. Working on the dissertation Raad had to encounter extensive work with archives and archival documents, as well as obtaining theoretical literacy, research and presentation skills to meet the demands of a PhD. Those skills Raad will employ throughout his artistic practice.

== Work ==
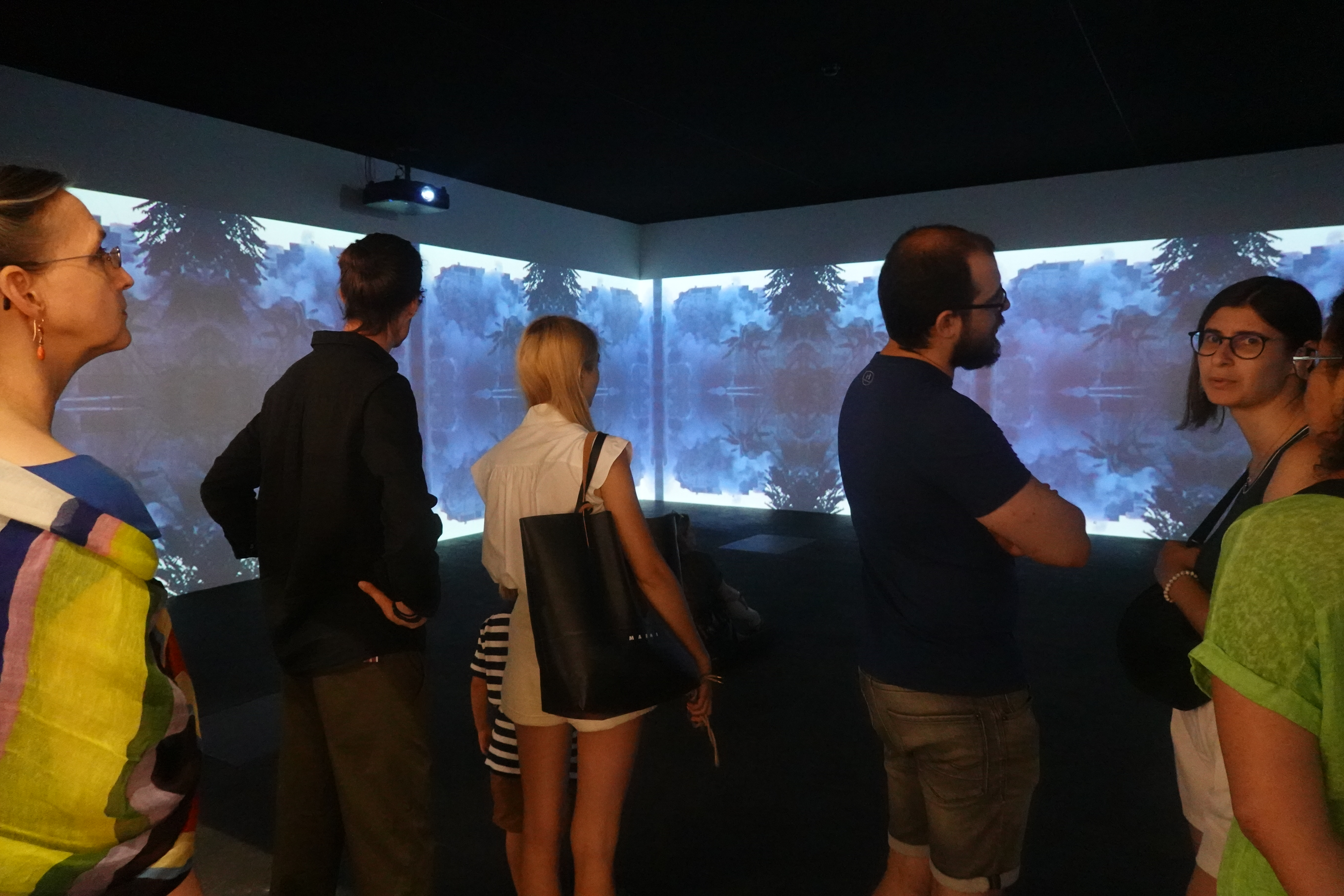
Viewers in front of Walid Raad's installation at Unlimited section of Art Basel 2025

Raad's video works include Talaeen a Junuub (Up to the South) (Salloum/Raad, 60 min., 1993), I Think It Would Be Better If I Could Weep (6 min.18sec., 2000) a collection of video shorts titled The Dead Weight of a Quarrel Hangs (Raad, 18 min., 1996–1999), and Hostage: The Bachar Tapes (Raad/Bachar), 18 min., 2000). Mixed-media projects include The Atlas Group: Documents from The Atlas Group Archive (1999 to the present), The Loudest Muttering Is Over: Documents from The Atlas Group Archive (2001 to the present), and My Neck Is Thinner Than A Hair (2004).ä

The artists is also a member of the Fondation Arabe pour l’image (FAI), founded in Beirut in 1996, which collects and exhibits photographic testimony from the Arab world. In this context Raad has co-curated with Akram Zaatari the exhibition titled Mapping Sitting: On portraiture and Photography, an investigation in Arab photography and its relationship to questions of identity.

In June 2009, "The Atlas Group (1989-2004)" exhibition opened at the Reina Sofia in Madrid. Undertaken by Raad, the project aimed to research and document the contemporary history of Lebanon, specifically the years between 1975 and 1991. The exhibition - consisting of installations, videos, and photographs - attempts to draw awareness to the various ways in which history is told, organized, and sometimes manipulated. From this perspective The Atlas Group archive's fictional character makes it a kind of counter-archive to the FAI.

Raad has collaborated with Chinese American artist David Diao, and their work was shown in fall 2012 at Paula Cooper Gallery.

=== The Atlas Group ===
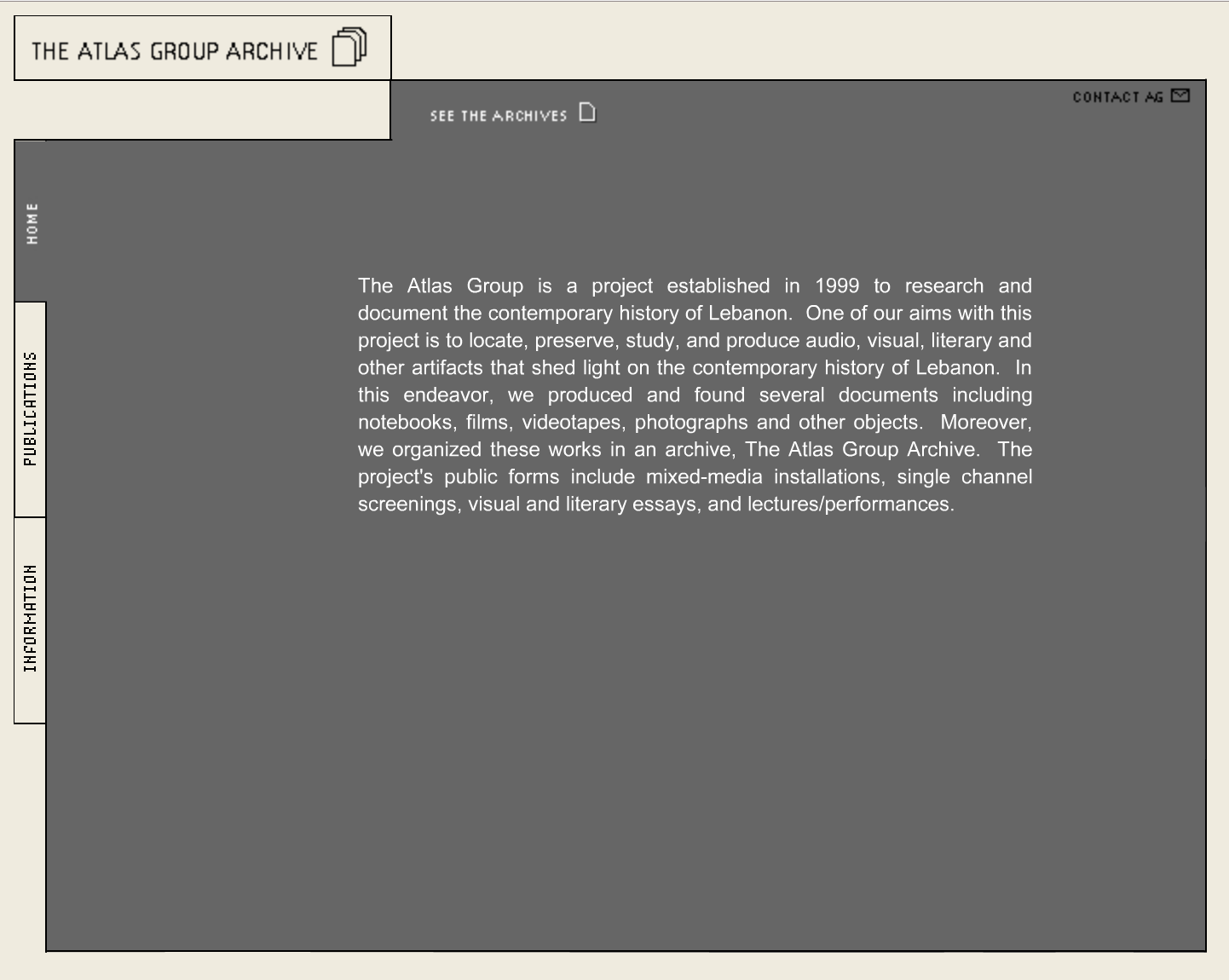
The mission of The Atlas Group, manifested on the title page of the online archive.

In the late 1990s Raad created a fictional foundation called The Atlas Group in order to accommodate and contextualise his growing output of works documenting the Lebanese Civil Wars, generally dated 1975–1990. Within Atlas Group Raad produces artworks, addressing the infrastructural, societal, and psychic devastation wrought by the wars, which he then re-dates and attributes to an array of invented figures who in turn are said to have donated these works directly or by proxy to The Atlas Group archive. Regardless of original medium of the documents, Raad processes and outputs all of his work digitally consciously adding another layer of documentary intervention to his overarching fictional conceit. Raad openly states the fictional dimension of the collective simultaneously applying complex methodology and performative dimension of Atlas Group presentation to blur the line between fiction and reality:"In different places and at different times I have called the Atlas Group an imaginary foundation, a foundation I established in 1976, and a foundation established in 1976 by Maha Traboulsi. In Lebanon in 1999, I stated, "The Atlas Group is a nonprofit foundation established in Beirut in 1967." In New York in 2000 and in Beirut in 2002, I stated, "The Atlas Group is an imaginary foundation that I established in 1999." I say different things at different times and in different places according to personal, historical, cultural, and political considerations with regard to the geographical location and my personal and professional relation with the audience and how much they know about the political, economic, and cultural histories of Lebanon, the wars in Lebanon, the Middle East, and contemporary art. I also always mention in exhibitions and lectures that the Atlas Group documents are ones that I produced and that I attribute to various imaginary individuals. But even this direct statement fails, in many instances, to make evident for readers or an audience the imaginary nature of the Atlas Group and its documents." Not the least important fact is the dual attribution of dates to all documents within archive: the first are attributions by The Atlas Group, while the second refer to Raad's production of the work. Artworks with only one date are not part of The Atlas Group's "official" archive. The Atlas Group is always presented by Raad through public lectures accompanying public display (film screenings, exhibitions displaying photography, audio, video and a variety of documents from the group's archives). Atlas Group and its digital archive are rooted in Raad's long-term investigation of historiography, archives and the effects of personal and collective trauma on memory and its articulation. Raad intentionally and explicitly employs fictional devices in approaching those themes. For example, a number of core documents from the Atlas Group Archive, several notebooks, series of photographs, and 8-mm films are attributed to the estate of the (fictional) Lebanese historian, Dr. Fadl Fakhouri. Within public presentations Raad, performing the representative of the Atlas Group, articulates the Lebanese Civil Wars as follows: "We do not consider "The Lebanese Civil War" to be a settled chronology of events, dates, personalities, massacres, invasions, but rather we also want to consider it as an abstraction constituted by various discourses, and, more importantly, by various modes of assimilating the data of the world."

More recently, certain sections of the archive have been the object of a number of installations in museum spaces.

Under the name of Atlas Group, Raad made a series of books published by Walther König: a sort of imaginary collection of Dr. Fakhouri's found notebooks reports on Lebanon's 15 year civil war. Atlas Group has been included in two Whitney Biennials in New York (2000 and 2002), Documenta 11in Kassel, Germany (2002) with the following year his work was included in the Venice Biennale. Raad's first solo exhibition in the United States was held in 2006 at the Kitchen, New York whereas his first solo show in Middle East has happened only 2 years later, at the Galerie Sfeir-Semler in Beirut.

=== Gulf Labor ===
Raad is an organizer of Gulf Labor, a coalition of artists and activists organized to bring awareness to issues surrounding the living and working conditions on Abu Dhabi's Saadiyat Island. In May 2015, he was denied entry to Dubai on grounds of "security". In response, the international committee for Modern and contemporary art museums, CIMAM, issued a statement of support of Raad. Shortly after, leading curators from institutions in Asia and India as well as Europe and North America – including Glenn Lowry of the Museum of Modern Art, Nicholas Serota of Tate, and Doryun Chong of M+ – signed an open letter calling on institutions in the West that are working in the Persian Gulf region – the Solomon R. Guggenheim Foundation and the Musée du Louvre, among others – to help lift the travel bans imposed on Raad and Ashok Sukumaran.

== Exhibitions ==
Raad's works have been exhibited at Documenta 11 (Kassel), The Venice Biennale (Venice), The Whitney Biennial (New York), The Ayloul Festival (Beirut, Lebanon), Home Works (curated by Ashkal Alwan, Beirut, Lebanon) and numerous other festivals in Europe, the Middle East, and North America.

Selected Solo Exhibitions

- 2023 Cotton Under My Feet: The Hamburg Chapter, Kunsthalle Hamburg, Germany
- 2022 We lived so well together, Kunsthalle Mainz, Germany
- 2021 Walid Raad.Cotton Under My Feet, Thyssen-Bornemisza Museo Nacional, Madrid, Spain
- 2021 Walid Raad, Carré d’Art-Musée d’art contemporain, Chapelle des Jésuites, Nîmes, France
- 2021 Walid Raad: We can make rain but no one came to ask, La Maison des Arts Brussels, Belgium
- 2020 Sweet Talks, Sfeir-Semler Gallery, Hamburg, Germany
- 2020 Let's be honest, the weather helped, Moderna Museet, Stockholm, Sweden
- 2019 Let's be honest, the weather helped, Stedelijk Museum Amsterdam, Netherlands
- 2017 Yet Another Letter to the Reader, Fondazione Volume!, Rome, Italy
- 2017 Better Be Watching the Clouds, Sfeir-Semler Gallery, Beirut, Lebanon
- 2016 Walid Raad, The Institute of Contemporary Art / Boston, USA
- 2016 Walid Raad, Museo Jumex, Mexico City, Mexico
- 2016 Letter to the Reader, The Paula Cooper Gallery, New York, USA
- 2016 Those did are near. Those that are far., SITU Studio at Stomein Synagogue, Germany
- 2016 Walid Raad: Section 39_Index XXXVII: Traboulsi, Asia Art Archive, Hong Kong
- 2015 Walid Raad, Museum of Modern Art, New York, USA
- 2014 Walid Raad: Preface, Carré d’Art-Musée d’art contemporain, Nîmes, France; Museo MADRE, Naples, Italy
- 2014 Walid Raad: Postface, University Museum of Contemporary Art, Amherst, USA
- 2014 Postface, Sfeir-Semler Gallery, Hamburg, Germany
- 2014 31st São Paulo Biennial: How to Talk About Things That Don't Exist, São Paulo, Brazil
- 2013 Walid Raad. Preface to the First Edition, Louvre, Paris, France
- 2012 Scratching on Things I Could Disavow, Sfeir-Semler Gallery, Beirut, Lebanon
- 2011 Walid Raad – 2011 Hasselblad Award Winner, Hasselblad Foundation, Hasselblad Center at the Gothenburg Museum of Art, Sweden
- 2011 Scratching on Things I Could Disavow. A History of Art in the Arab World, Thyssen-Bornemisza Art Contemporary, Vienna, Austria
- 2011 Walid Raad: Miraculous Beginnings, Bildmuseet, Umea, Sweden
- 2011 Walid Raad: Miraculous Beginnings, Kunsthalle Zürich, Switzerland
- 2010 Miraculous Beginnings, Whitechapel Gallery, London, UK; Bildmuseet, Umea University, Sweden; Kunsthalle Zürich, Switzerland
- 2010 SweetTalk: Commissions (Beirut), Camera, Austria
- 2009 Scratching on Things I Could Disavow: A History of Art in the Arab World, Sfeir-Semler Gallery, Hamburg, Germany
- 2009 Scratching on Things I Could Disavow: A History of Art in the Arab World _ Part I _ Volume 1 _ Chapter 1: Beirut (1992–2005), Paula Cooper Gallery, New York, USA
- 2009 The Atlas Group (1989–2004), Museo Nacional Centro de Arte Reina Sofia, Madrid, Spain
- 2009 Scratching on Things I Could Disavow: A History of Art in the Arab World, Part 1_Volume 1_Chapter 1, (Beirut: 1992–2005), REDCAT, Los Angeles, USA
- 2008 A History of Modern and Contemporary Arab Art: Part I_Chapter 1: Beirut (1992–2005), Sfeir-Semler Gallery, Beirut, Lebanon
- 2008 I might die before I get a rifle, Kunstverein Heidelberg, Germany
- 2008 We Can Make Rain But No One Came To Ask, David Winton Bell Gallery, Brown University, Rhode Island, USA
- 2007 We Decided to Let Them Say "We are Convinced" Twice (It was More Convincing this Way), Paula Cooper Gallery, New York, USA
- 2007 The Atlas Group (1989–2004): A Project by Walid Raad, Museo Tamayo Arte Contemporaneo, Mexico-City, Mexico
- 2007 The Atlas Group (1989-2004: A Project by Walid Raad), Culturgest, Lisboa, Portugal
- 2006 Walid Raad, Sfeir-Semler Gallery, Hamburg, Germany
- 2006 The Atlas Group (1989–2004): A Project by Walid Raad, Hamburger Bahnhof, Berlin, Germany
- 2006 The Dead Weight of a Quarrel Hangs: Documents from The Atlas Group Archive, The Kitchen, New York, USA
- 2006 We Can Make It Rain But No One Came To Ask: Documents from The Atlas Group Archive, Leonard & Bina Ellen Art Gallery, Concordia University, Montreal, Canada
- 2006 We Decided to Let Them Say "We are Convinced" Twice (It was More Convincing this Way), Henry Art Gallery, University of Washington, Seattle, USA
- 2005 I Was Overcome With a Momentary Panic, Agnes Etherington Art Centre, Kingston, Ontario, Canada
- 2005 Funny, How Thin The Line Is: Documents from The Atlas Group Archive, FACT, Liverpool, UK
- 2004 My Neck is Thinner Than a Hair: Engines, Sfeir-Semler Gallery, Hamburg, Germany
- 2004 I was Overcome with a Momentary Panic, AGYU, York University, Toronto
- 2004 The Truth Will Be Known, Prefix Institute, Toronto
- 2004 The Truth Will Be Known, Krannert Art Museum, Illinois, USA
- 2003 The Truth Will Be Known, La Galerie, Noisy-le-Sec, France
- 2003 The Truth Will Be Known, World Wide Video Festival, Amsterdam, Netherlands

Selected Group Exhibitions

2024

- A Model, MUDAM, Luxembourg

2023

- So it appears, Institute for Contemporary Art, Virginia Commonwealth University, Richmond, USA
- TOP SECRET: Cine y Espionage, CAIXA Forum, Barcelona, Spain
- TOP SECRET: Cine y Espionage, CAIXA Forum, Madrid, Spain
- Moving Images in the Arab World, Art Explora Festival Photo Pavillon, Various stops across the Mediterranean region, Marseille, France (forthcoming)

2022

- Think We Must – düsseldorf photo + Biennale for Visual and Sonic Media, Akademie-Galerie – Die Neue Sammlung, Düsseldorf, Germany
- Based on a True Story. . ., Museum of Contemporary Art Chicago, United States
- Give and Take. Bilder über Bilder. 8. Triennale der Photographie 2022 – Currency, Hamburger Kunsthalle, Germany
- Homosphäre, Kunsthalle Mainz, Germany
- Temporary Atlas: Mapping the Self in the Art of Today, MOSTYN, Wales, United Kingdom
- Flowers Forever. Flowers in Art and Culture, Kunsthalle München, Munich, Germany

2021

- Enjoy - die mumok Sammlung im Wandel, mumok, Wien, Austria
- ARTIST'S LIBRARY: 1989–2021, MACRO Museum of Contemporary Art of Rome, Italy

2020

- A sun yellow with anger, Sfeir-Semler Gallery, Hamburg, Germany
- Faces: a Look at the Other, Carré d’Art, Nîmes, France
- A Bottomless Silence, Wallach Art Gallery at Columbia University, New York, USA

2019

- Home Is a Foreign Place, The Met Breuer, New York, USA
- Time, Forward!, V-A-C Zattere, Dorsoduro, Venice, Italy
- Konkrete Gegenwart, Haus Konstruktiv, Zurich, Switzerland

2018

- Possibilities for a Non-Alienated Life, Kochi-Muziris Biennale, India
- Camera Austria International. Laboratory for Photography and Theory, Camera Austria, Mönchsberg, Austria
- Revolution Generations, Mathaf: Arab Museum of Modern Art, Doha, Qatar
- SHINE ON ME. We and the sun, Deutsches Hygiene-Museum, Dresden, Germany
- Truth is black, write over it with a mirage's light, Darat al Funun, Amman, Jordan
- Acts of Translation, Mohammad and Mahera Abu Ghazaleh Foundation, Amman, Jordan
- The Dictionary of Evil, Gangwon International Biennale, South Korea
- Ausstellen des Ausstellens, Staatliche Kunsthalle Baden-Baden, Germany
- Statues Also Die, Fondazione Museo delle Antichità Egizie di Torino, Italy
- Mobile Worlds On the Migration of Things in Transcultural Societies Museum für Kunst und Gewerbe Hamburg, Germany
- General Rehearsal: A Show in three acts from the collections of V-A-C, MMOMA and KADIST, Moscow Museum of Modern Art, Moscow, Russia

2017

- Mario Merz Award Shortlist (with Suha Traboulsi), Fondazione Merz, Turin, Italy
- What We Know that We Don't Know, Kadist, San Francisco, USA
- The Principe of Uncertainty, National Museum of Modern and Contemporary Art, Korea
- Ways of Seeing, ARTER, Istanbul, Turkey
- Home Beirut. Sounding the Neighbors, MAXXI Rome, Italy
- Many Tongues: Art, Language, and Revolution in the Middle East and South Asia, Museum of Contemporary Art, Chicago, USA
- The Truth of Uncertainty: Moving Image Works from the Hall Collection, Schloss Derneburg Museum, Derneburg, Germany
- A Thousand Roaring Beasts: Display Devices for a Critical Modernity, Centro Andaluz de Arte Contemporaneo, Seville, Spain
- Field Guide, Remai Modern Museum, Saskatoon, Canada
- Hämatli & Patrice, MUSEION of Modern and Contemporary Art Bolzano, Bolzano, Italy
- Manipulate the World, Moderna Museet, Stockholm, Sweden

2016

- Nothing but blue skies, Les Rencontres de la Photographie, Arles, France
- The Eighth Climate (What does art do?), 11th Gwangju Biennale, South Korea
- Question the Wall Itself, Walker Arts Center, Minnesota, USA
- Transcultural Flux, TrAP, Oslo, Norway
- WITNESS, Kent Fine Art, New York, USA
- The Sun Placed in the Abyss, Columbus Museum of Art, Columbus, Ohio, USA
- Centennial Exhibition: The Arts Club of Chicago at 100, Arts Club of Chicago, Illinois, USA
- Nothing but blue skies, Les Rencontres de la Photographie, Arles, France
- Those that are near. Those that are far, with Situ Studio, Stommeln Synagogue, Pulheim, Germany

== Collections ==
Bristol Museum and Art Gallery, Bristol; Carré d’Art - Museum of Contemporary Art Nîmes, Nîmes; Centre National d´Art et de Culture Georges Pompidou, Paris; FNAC, Centre National des Arts Plastiques, Paris, France; FRAC Languedoc Roussillon, Montpellier, France; Glasgow Gallery of Modern Art, Glasgow; Guggenheim Museum, New York; Hamburger Bahnhof, Berlin; Hamburger Kunsthalle, Hamburg; Hirschhorn Museum, Washington DC; IFEMA, Madrid, Spain; Kunsthaus Zürich, Zurich; Kunstmuseum Stuttgart, Germany; Mathaf: Arab Museum of Modern Art, Doha; MUMOK, Museum Moderner Kunst, Vienna; Museion, Bolzano; Museo Reina Sofia, Madrid; Museum für Moderne Kunst, Frankfurt/Main; Museum of Contemporary Art, Athena, Greece; MOMA, Museum Of Modern Art, New York; San Francisco Museum of Modern Art, San Francisco, California; Serralves, Porto; Stedelijk Museum, Amsterdam; TATE Modern, London; The British Museum, London; The Metropolitan Museum of Art, New York; Walker Art Center, Minneapolis; Whitney Museum of American Art, New York.

== Awards ==
In 2019, Raad won the Aachen Art Prize but the prize was rescinded after he refused to denounce the BDS movement which calls for a cultural boycott of Israel. In 2004–5, Raad was a Fellow of the Vera List Center for Art and Politics.

He is also a recipient of the 2016 Infinity Award: Art, 2011 Hasselblad Award, 2007 The Alpert Award in the Arts (First Prize) and Deutsche Börse Photography First Prize.

In 2002 Raad received first prizes at the Onion City Experimental Film and Video Festival, the Vidarte 2002 Festival in Mexico, and at the Oneiras Film and Video Festival in Portugal. He is also the recipient of the 2002 Media Arts Awards special prize and the 2001 Video Ex first prize.
