= Ashkal Alwan =

Ashkal Alwan (Arabic: أشكال ألوان), The Lebanese Association for Plastic Arts is an association promoting and producing contemporary art practices in Lebanon.

== History ==
Ashkal Alwan was founded in 1994 by Christine Tohmé (Curator), Marwan Rechmaoui (Artist), Rania Tabbara (Graphic Designer and Interior Designer), Mustapha Yamout (Cultural Events Organizer) and Leila Mroueh (Communications Director). Ashkal Alwan (in Arabic: forms and colors) was created in the aftermath of the Lebanese war. It is nowadays an informal and alternative platform that helps a new generation of Lebanese artists to produce and exhibit their artwork.

Building a large network of local and international partner institutions, Ashkal Alwan became a major and influential actor on the regional art scene, exhibiting the work of local and international artists such as Jalal Toufic, Akram Zaatari, Lamia Joreige, Walid Raad, Rabih Mroué and many others. Its director, Christine Tohmé, is regularly ranked among the 100 most powerful people in the art world.

In 2011, Ashkal Alwan inaugurated the Home Workspace in a former industrial building neighboring Beirut Art Center. The venue hosts cultural events and the Home Workspace Program, a 10 months educational program run under the direction of a different resident professor. The 2011-2012 inauguration year was under the direction of Emily Jacir.

== Public Programming, Workshops and Curated Projects ==
2019

- Home Works 8. A Forum on Cultural Practices, Beirut

2017

- Upon a Shifting Plate, an off-site project of the Sharjah Biennial 13, co-organized with the Sharjah Art Foundation

2013

- Parallel Modernities: A Sweet Sixties Conference
- Workshop with Hu Fang and Tarek Atoui

2012

- How Soon Is Now: A Tribute to Dreamers, an exhibition by Joana Hadjithomas and Khalil Joreige
- Love at First Sight: The Arabic Digital Book
- Sensibilities, Experiences: Going Beyond the Surface with Laurence Leblanc

2009

- Video Works 2009

2007

- Video Avril
- Meeting Points 5 Festival

2006

- Most Probably I Will Be Performing this Dream Tonight
- Travelling Is Impossible: Harun, Kodwo and I (films by Harun Farocki and the Black Audio Film Collective)

2004

- Laughter, in collaboration with LIFT (London International Festival of Theater)
- My Neck Is Thinner than a Hair, a presentation by the Atlas Group (Volumes 1-21)

2003

- Possible Narratives, as part of Videobrasil

2001

- Audio Workshop with the British Council
- Missing Links at the Townhouse Gallery in Cairo, Egypt

2000

- Hamra Street Project
- Contemporary Art from Lebanon at the Borusan Sanat Gallery in Istanbul, Turkey

1999

- Corniche Project

1997

- Sioufi Garden Project

1995

- Sanayeh Garden Project
