= Thomas Helbig =

German painter

- Born: 1967 (age 58–59); Rosenheim, West Germany
- Occupation: Artist

Thomas Helbig (born 1967 in Rosenheim, West Germany) is an artist based in Berlin.

Helbig attended the Academy of Fine Arts, Munich and Goldsmiths, University of London, from 1989 to 1996.

He has shown work in many exhibitions including at Oldenburger Kunstverein, at the ICA in London and at Maschenmode in Berlin. He has also shown at galleries and museums such as Museum Abteiberg in Mönchengladbach, Danel Hug Gallery in Los Angeles and The Approach in London. Helbig is represented by China Art Objects Gallery ((https://web.archive.org/web/20101026014445/http://chinaartobjects.com/)), in Los Angeles, Galerie Ban Kaufmann , Munich and Galerie Guido W. Baudach , Berlin.
