= Critical lens =

Literature analysis technique

A critical lens is a way of looking at a particular work of literature by focusing on style choices, plot devices, and character interactions and how they show a certain theme (the lens in question). It is a common literary analysis technique.

== Types ==
There are many types of critical lenses. Here are several that are the most common.

=== Marxist ===
The Marxist critical lens came into vogue with the advent of the Marxist school of thought. Sometimes also called the socioeconomic lens, this focuses on how characters' wealth and social connections affect the work. Leon Trotsky's Literature and Revolution claims that "old literature and 'culture' were the expressions of the nobleman and the bureaucrat" and that "the proletariat has also to create its own culture and its own art". This viewpoint is common for the Marxist critical lens.

=== Psychoanalytic ===
Also called the Freudian or Jungian critical lens, this school of thought analyzes the psychological motives of the characters. Jungian literary criticism in particular focuses on archetypes.

=== Gender/Queer Studies ===
The gender/queer lens, while influenced by the feminist lens, treats gender as more of a spectrum, and also considers human sexuality. David Richter notes in The Critical Tradition: Classic Texts and Contemporary Trends that "XXY syndromes, natural sexual bimorphisms, as well as surgical transsexuals [...] defy attempts at binary classification". This thinking, along with the advent of a more prominent LGBT community, has heavily influenced this lens.

=== Semiotics ===
The semiotic literary lens grew out of the structuralist literary lens, which was influenced by structuralism. It came about with the advent of semiotics.

=== Moral ===
The moral lens was the earliest critical lens to come about, beginning in Book X of Plato's Republic. In it, he notes "will any one be profited if under the influence of [...] poetry, man neglect[s] justice and virtue?" This lens was common through the end of the 19th century. For example, in Jonathan Swift's Gulliver's Travels, Gulliver notes in one of his letters that he had written "for [people's] amendment, and not their approbation", reflecting the belief at the time that the novel was primarily a method for instruction of the populace, and entertainment was only a secondary goal. This is especially true in books for children from the time - see for example the book that a young Jane Eyre is given by Mr. Brocklehurst, which "'is a book entitled the 'Child's Guide,' read it with prayer, especially that part containing 'An account of the awfully sudden death of Martha G -, a naughty child addicted to falsehood and deceit'" - this is meant to instruct Jane in the consequences of lying, and was common in children's literature of the time. This lens is common in analysis of religious works.

=== Ecocriticism ===
Ecocriticism addresses the work from an environmental and ecological perspective.

== Development ==
The earliest critical lens was the moral lens, which came about in 360 B.C. in the writings of Plato's Republic.

== See also ==
- Literary criticism
- Critical theory
