= Jessica Dickinson =

Abstract painter

- Born: 1975 (age 50–51)
- Education: Cranbrook Academy of Art (MFA); Maryland Institute College of Art (BFA)

Jessica Dickinson (born in 1975) is an American painter based in Brooklyn, New York. She was born in St. Paul, Minnesota.

== Early life and education ==
Dickinson earned a BFA in painting from the Maryland Institute College of Art in 1997, and she got her MFA in painting from the Cranbrook Academy of Art.

== Career ==
Dickinson makes only four paintings a year, cultivating a slow and methodical practice. While her paintings evolve over many months, her drawing projects – notebook drawings, traces, works on paper, and remainders – extend her painted explorations through their own particular materialities and modalities.

Dickinson typically begins by spreading limestone polymer, or spackle, onto wooden panels. She, then, sands the thick coats of spackle until smooth, and layers thin swaths of oil paint that are absorbed into the plaster. After creating the base, Dickinson carves, gouges, scrapes, and paints, manipulating the surface itself in a careful cycle of construction and destruction. The Solomon R. Guggenheim Museum notes that, “her paintings mimic a process of decay by exposing the impact of time on the medium”.

== Key exhibitions ==
- 2022 Solomon R. Guggenheim Museum (Group Exhibition), New York, NY
- 2022 Altman Siegel, San Francisco, CA
- 2021 James Fuentes, New York, NY
- 2021 Cranbrook Art Museum (Group Exhibition), Bloomfield Hills, MI
- 2019 Altman Siegel, San Francisco, CA
- 2017 Katzen Arts Center (Group Exhibition), Washington, D.C.
- 2013 David Petersen Gallery, Minneapolis, MN
- 2012 Maisterravalbuena Galeria, Madrid, Spain
- 2011 Rhode Island School of Design Museum (Group Exhibition), Providence, RI

== Public collections ==
Dickinson’s work is included in the Rachofsky Collection, Dallas, TX; the Zabludowicz Collection, London; and the Solomon R. Guggenheim Museum, New York, NY.

== Awards and residencies ==
- 2016 Steep Rock Arts Residency, Washington, CT
- 2014 Belle Foundation Individual Grant
- 2008 Farpath Grant and Residency, Dijon, France
- 2006 Artist-In-Residence, University of Tennessee, Knoxville, TN
- 2003 Change Inc. Grant
- 2001 The Space Program, The Marie Walsh Sharpe Art Foundation, New York, NY
- 1998 Marguerite Kimball Merit Scholarship, Cranbrook Academy of Art
