= Ivan Moudov =

Bulgarian artist

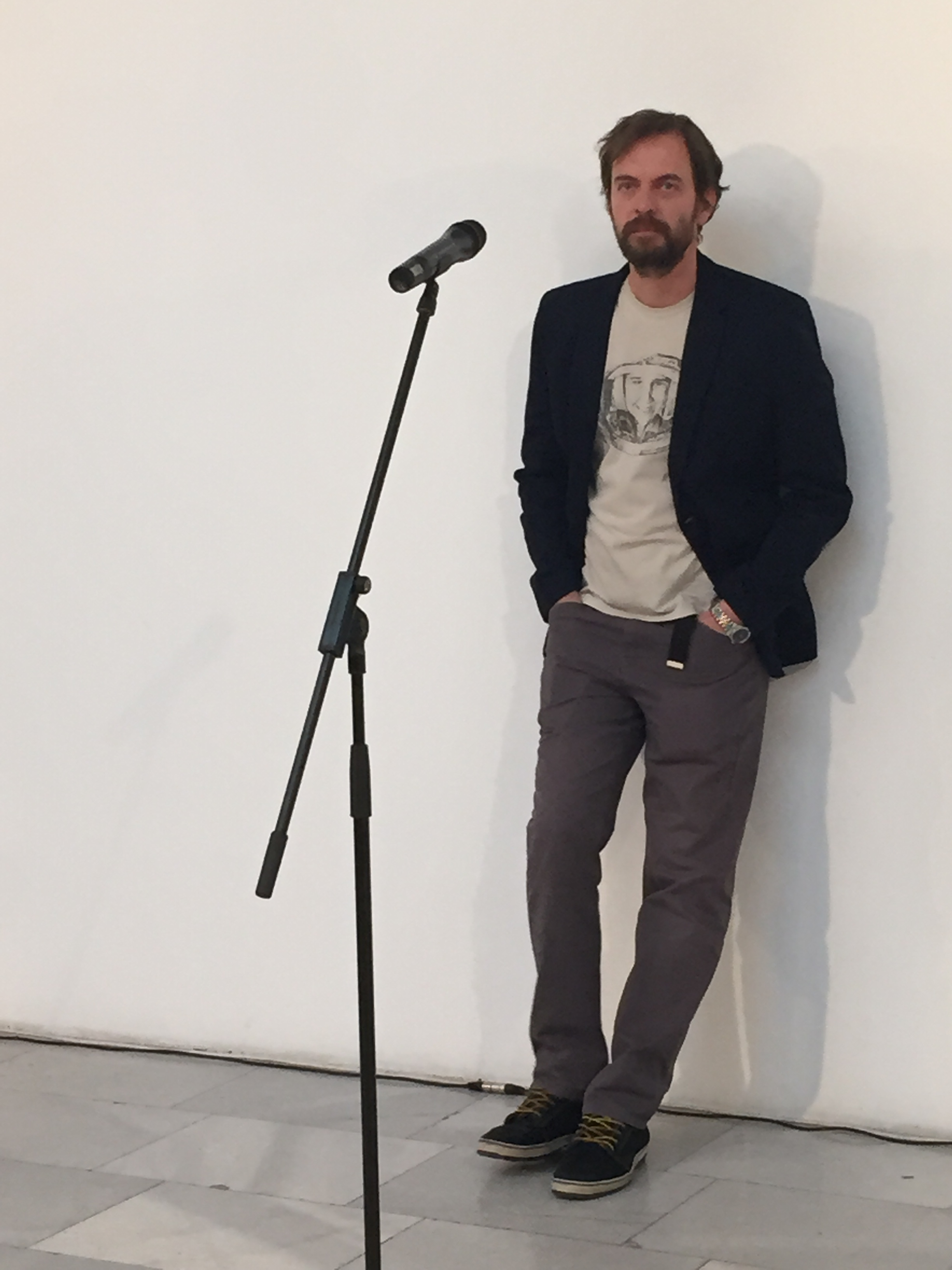
- Ivan Moudov, March 2016
- Born: 1975 (age 49–50); Sofia, Bulgaria
- Education: National Academy of Art
- Known for: Conceptual art, Performing Arts, Avant-garde
- Notable work: 14'13 minutes priority, Traffic Control
- Awards: Trieste Contemporanea Award 2006, Gaudenz B. Ruf 2010
- Website: ica-sofia.org/en/ica-sofia/members/item/21-ivan-moudov

Ivan Moudov (born 1975 in Sofia, Bulgaria) is a Bulgarian conceptual artist. He is member of the Institute of Contemporary Art - Sofia since 2007.

His most notable works evolve around the traffic behaviour, including ''One hour priority'' in 2000, Sofia, 14:13 Minutes Priority in 2005 in Weimar and the similar work 9:43 Minutes Priority in 2009, presented at the Saltzburger Kunstverein in Salzburg, Germany.

The works of the Traffic Control cycle are presented at various contemporary art festivals in different European cities, including Graz, Austria in 2001, Cetinje, Montenegro in 2002, Thessaloniki, Greece 2003.

Another theme that frequents his works is related to the missing contemporary art collection in his home country. The whole cycle is named MUSIZ after the abbreviation of imaginative contemporary art museum. A video installation of the cycle is presented in 2010 in Plovdiv and later in Alberta Pane gallery in Paris.
