= Şener Özmen =

Artist (b. 1971)

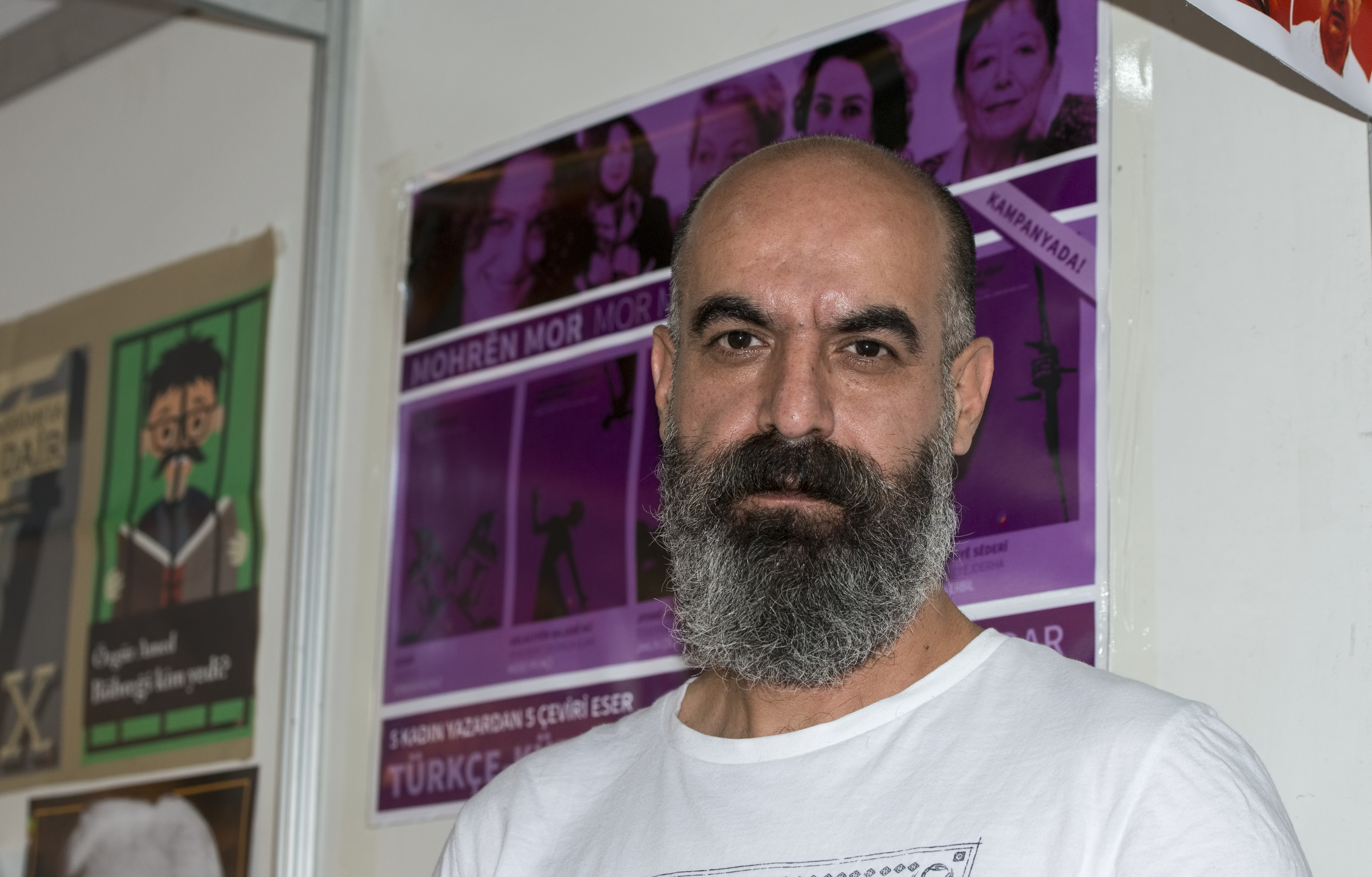
Şener Ozmen

Şener Özmen (born 1971, Idil) is a Kurdish artist.

== Early life ==
He graduated from the Department of Painting Education at the Faculty of Education at Çukurova University.

== Career ==
He began as an artist, drawing comics and writing poetry. His poetry was published in Düşün, Mavi Çizgi and the Islık amongst others. Later he worked in contemporary art.

He had solo exhibitions and his art was included in group exhibitions in several countries. His art was shown in exhibitions in the Centre Pompidou and the documenta 13 and he won the Prix Meuly in Thun, Switzerland.

He wrote articles concerning art exhibitions that were published in Birgün newspaper, Sanat Dünyamız and Siyahî.

His artwork includes videos, sculptures and paintings and often has a focus on Kurdish culture and the Kurdish question. He is an author of fiction and has translated Kurdish literature into English.

== Books ==
- Eskiden Ne Güzeldi(Once How Beautiful It Was),Liman Editions, 1999
- Şaşıracaksın(You Will Be Amazed),Liman Editions, 1999
- Ağıt mı bu yaktığın?(Is That a Dirge You Sing?),Liman Editions, 1999
- Sözüm Haritadan Dışarı(Saving Your Map),Lîs Editions, 2004
- Rojnivîska Spinoza (The Diary of Spinoza), Lîs Editions, 2008
- The Epic of Kawa and Azhî Dehaq, 2011
- My Heart is a Pillow for Love, 2012
- Pêşbaziya Çîrokên Neqediyayî(The Bout of the Incompetent Stories), Lîs Editions, 2010
- Gramera Bêhizûr (The Restless Grammar), Lîs Editions, 2014
