= Hiroyuki Masuyama =

Japanese photographer and artist (born 1968)

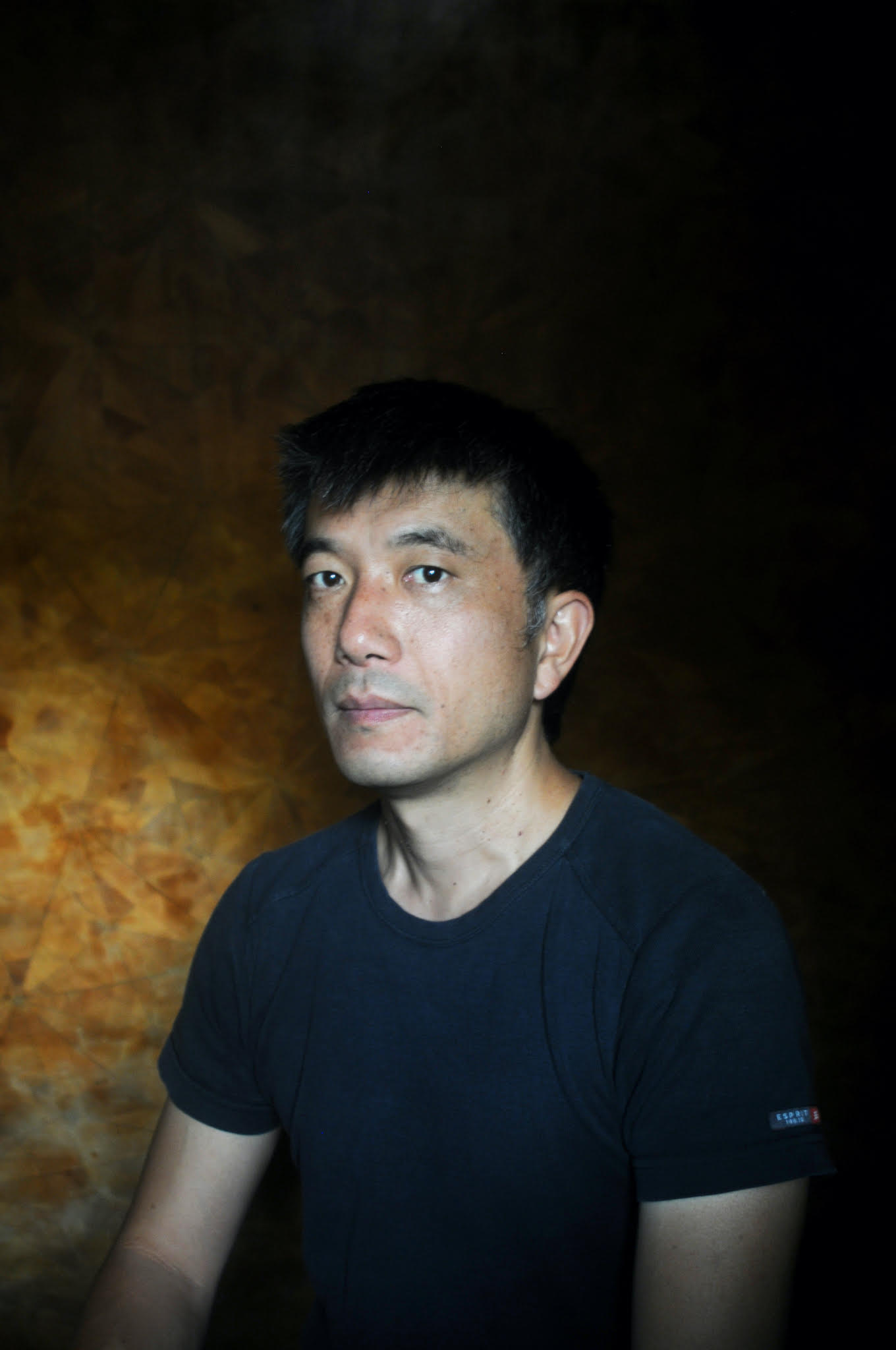
- Born: 28 July 1968 (age 58); Tsukuba, Japan
- Education: Tokyo National University of Fine Arts and Music; Kunstakademie Düsseldorf; Academy of Media Arts Cologne
- Website: art.hiroyukimasuyama.com

Hiroyuki Masuyama (born 28 July 1968) is a Japanese photographer and artist.

== Early life and education ==
Masuyama was born in Tsukuba, Japan, on 28 July 1968. He graduated from the Tokyo National University of Fine Arts and Music in 1991 and undertook postgraduate studies in mural painting at the same school from 1991 to 1993. From 1995 to 1999, Masuyama studied at the Kunstakademie Düsseldorf under a DAAD scholarship. He studied at the Academy of Media Arts Cologne from 1999 to 2001.

== Career ==
Masuyama's work involves digital editing to combine numerous photographs into a composite image, with a focus on reproducing historical landscape art. His work has been featured in many galleries and museums, including the Alte Nationalgalerie, the Kallmann-Museum, and the Messner Mountain Museum.

Masuyama has been based in Düsseldorf, Germany, since 2001.

In 2019, Masuyama showcased a series of works exploring space and time at Studio la Città in Verona, Italy. In 2022, Masuyama returned to Studio la Città for a solo show, Playing with Shadows, that involved tracing the shadows of a variety of flowers onto tracing paper over the course of their life cycle and superimposing the images.
