= Sarah Anne Johnson =

Canadian artist (born 1976)

- Born: 1976 (age 49–50); Winnipeg, Manitoba, Canada
- Education: University of Manitoba; Yale School of Art
- Known for: Installation artist, sculptor, oil painter, video artist, Performance artist, dancer
- Notable work: Tree Planting (2005); House On Fire (2009)
- Awards: Chalmers Art Fellowship
- Website: sarahannejohnson.ca

Sarah Anne Johnson (born 1976) is a Canadian photo-based, multidisciplinary artist working in installation, bronze sculpture, oil paint, video, performance, and dance.

== Life and career ==
Johnson received her B.F.A. at the University of Manitoba in 2002 and completed her Master's in Photography at the Yale School of Art in 2004.

Her first exhibition, Tree Planting (2005), was purchased by the Guggenheim Museum while the National Gallery of Canada bought most of her second show, The Galapagos Project (2007). Johnson was chosen along with other Canadian artists by curator Jonathan Shaughnessy to be shown in Builders (2012), a featured exhibition for the Canadian Biennial 2012 at the National Gallery of Canada for her role and ability to create Canada's cultural fabric. Michael F.B. Nesbitt, a notable contemporary art collector who donated Johnson's House on Fire (2009) series to the Art Gallery of Ontario, proclaims Johnson as a “shining example of an artist able to tell unique, personal stories in a universal way”.

Johnson lives and works in her hometown, Winnipeg. She is represented by the Stephen Bulger Gallery in Toronto and Julie Saul Gallery in New York.

== Themes ==
Johnson explores themes of utopia, the hopefulness and despair of a perfect world, humans’ relationship with the environment, and unique subcultures facing difficult conditions while “poking fun at it all”.

Although she often works in different media, Johnson expresses her frustrations with classical “straight” photography. In the Canadian Art article “7 Lessons from Sarah Anne Johnson”, she states, “My general interest in photography is showing what something looks like, but also what it feels like [… by] altering the surface or image in any way, I can describe what a space feels like psychologically, what it feels like to be there”. By using several mediums Johnson is able to separate photography and “true” documentary photographic representation by challenging the notion of photography as fact and different type of truths in capturing moments through photography.

Pamela Meredith, a senior curator at the TD Bank Group who purchased Johnson's Tree Planting (2005) series for the bank's collection stated she appreciated how Johnson recreated the photographed moment by manipulating our perception and disrupting memory.

=== Photographic series ===
- Wonderlust – Johnson explores sexual intimacy and the manifestations of intimacy where she took on the role of therapist, counselor, and director. By using multimedia alterations, Johnson is able to manipulate the photographs expressing her own feelings and responses. She examines her own feelings about intimacy and challenge what she sees as an enduring taboo around sex. She stated that the viewer's response to this collection reveals as much about them as it does about her work
- Arctic Wonderland – This series was begun during her The Arctic Circle Residency in 2009 with 14 other artists in order to create engagement and raising consciousness about worldly issues focusing on environmental destruction and the sublime of the Arctic. Johnson presents the Arctic as an unspoiled theme park suspended in time while facing ultimate ruin with effects of climate change, colonization and economic exploitation. It is viewed as an exploration of light – “A sensation that has long bewitched Canadian artists” and “Rugged hinterland photography worthy of Group of Seven”
- House on Fire – This series explores the dark story of Johnson's grandmother's unwitting participation in CIA-funded brainwashing experiments at the Allan Memorial Institute at McGill University in the mid-1950s. This collection includes altered photographs, small bronze sculptures, and a dollhouse based on her grandmother's traumatic story, fairy tales, myths, and a troubled psyche.
- The Galapagos Project – Johnson follows eco-volunteers in the Galapagos in pursuit of the restoration and maintenance of the Galapagos Islands’ ecosystem threatened by invading species. Themes include camaraderie and hopelessness. This series includes photographs and painted Sculpey doll sculptures.
- Tree Planting – This collection is based on three summers in the boreal forests in northern Manitoba following tree planters as a collective experience. It consists of a combination of real and set-up photography using painted Sculpey doll sculptures challenging fact and feeling, and event and memory. Tree Planting was completed for her thesis project during her MFA at Yale School of Art in 2004.

== Exhibitions ==
=== Selected solo exhibitions ===
- 2014: Wonderlust, Stephen Bulger Gallery, Toronto
- 2013: Wonderlust, Julie Saul Gallery, New York, NY
- 2013: Arctic Wonderland, Division Gallery, Montreal, QC
- 2011: Canadian Art Now – Storylines: Space, Colour, Geometry, Art Toronto, Toronto
- 2011: Arctic Wonderland, Stephen Bulger Gallery, Toronto, ON
- 2011: Arctic Wonderland, Julie Saul Gallery, New York, NY
- 2010: Dancing with the Doctor, Ace Art Gallery, Winnipeg, MB
- 2009: House on Fire, Julie Saul Gallery, New York, NY
- 2009: House on Fire, Art Gallery of Ontario, Toronto, ON
- 2009: New Work, Illingworth Kerr Gallery, Calgary, AB
- 2007: The Galapagos Project, Stephen Bulger Gallery, Toronto, ON
- 2007: The Galapagos Project, Julie Saul Gallery, New York, NY
- 2006: In the Forest, Bucket Rider Gallery, Chicago, IL
- 2006: Either Side of Eden, Plug In, Institute of Contemporary Art, Winnipeg, MB
- 2006: Tree Planting, Platform Gallery, Winnipeg, MB
- 2005: Tree Planting, Duke University, Durham, NC
- 2005: Tree Planting, Real Art Ways, Hartford, CT
- 2005: Tree Planting, Julie Saul Gallery, New York, NY

=== Selected group exhibitions ===
- 2014: Beyond Street – Lit Roads – Curatron generated exhibition, Platform Gallery, Stockholm, Sweden
- 2014: New Mythologies: Super Natural States and Polar Exploration, Fosdick-Nelson Gallery, Alfred, NY
- 2013: Under My Skin, Flowers Gallery, New York, NY
- 2013: They Made a Day Be a Day Here, Grand Prairie, touring exhibition, Canada
- 2012: Builders, The Canadian Biennial, National Gallery of Canada, Ottawa, ON
- 2012: The Perfect Storm, Julie Saul Gallery, New York, NY
- 2012: True North, Anchorage Museum, Anchorage, AK
- 2012: Oh Canada, Mass MoCA, Massachusetts
- 2012: Spectral Landscape, MOCCA, Toronto, ON
- 2012: Watch This Space: Contemporary Art from the AGO Collection, Art Gallery of Ontario, Toronto, ON
- 2012: Photography Is, Higher Pictures, New York, NY
- 2012: Le Miroir & L’Encyclopedie, Galerie Michel Journiac, Paris, France
- 2012: Winnipeg Now, Winnipeg Art Gallery, Winnipeg, MB
- 2012: My Winnipeg, Plug In Gallery, Winnipeg, MB
- 2011: Sobey Art Award, Art Gallery of Nova Scotia, Halifax, NS
- 2011: The View from Here: New Landscape, Macdonald Stewart Art Centre, Guelph, ON
- 2011: My Winnipeg, La Maison Rouge, Paris, FR
- 2011: Global Nature – Organized by the CMCP, Kamloops Art Gallery, Kamloops, BC
- 2011: Open Season, Flanders Gallery, Raleigh, NC
- 2011: 25 Years/25 Artists, Julie Saul Gallery, New York, NY
- 2011: My Winnipeg, Musée International des Arts Modestes, Sète, France
- 2010: Haunted: Contemporary Photography/Video/Performance, Guggenheim Museum, NY
- 2010: Out of The Woods, Leslie Tonkonow Artworks and Projects, New York, NY
- 2010: It Is What It Is, Recent Acquisitions of New Canadian Art, National Gallery of Canada, Ottawa, ON
- 2009: Windows and Mirrors, Julie Saul Gallery, New York, NY
- 2008: Rethinking Landscape: Contemporary Photography from the Allen G. Thomas, Jr. Collection, Taubman Museum of Art, Roanoke, North Carolina
- 2008: Elsewhere, The University of South Florida Contemporary Art Museum, Tampa, FL
- 2008: Guggenheim Collection: 1940s to Now, National Gallery of Victoria, Melbourne, AU
- 2008: 5th Biennale de Montreal, Centre International d'Art Contemporian de Montreal, QC
- 2008: L’Enfant de Cartier, Theatre de la Photographie et de l'Image, Nice, FR
- 2006: The Female Machine, Sister Gallery, Los Angeles, CA
- 2006: Stiff, Gallery 4000, Chicago, IL
- 2006: Soft Radical, Compact Space, Los Angeles, CA
- 2006: Either Side of Eden, Plug-In RCA, Winnipeg, MB
- 2006: Under 30, Ulrich Museum of Art, Wichita, KS
- 2005: Imprints, Canadian Museum of Contemporary Photography, Ottawa, ON
- 2005: J'en Reve, Foundation Cartier, Paris, FR
- 2005: On Transit, Mexicali, MX
- 2004: Dreamweavers, Yancey Richardson Gallery, NY
- 2004: Flirt, Neubacher Gallery, Toronto, ON

== Recognition ==
=== Collections ===
Her work is included in many Canadian and international public collections including The Guggenheim Museum, New York, Art Gallery of Ontario, Toronto, and The National Gallery of Canada, Ottawa.

Johnson has been commissioned to create work for the Bank of Montreal Project Room, Museum of Contemporary Canadian Art / Art Toronto Benefit, and Louis Vuitton.

=== Awards ===
She is the recipient of many grants and awards including the inaugural Grange Prize in 2008 granted by the Art Gallery of Ontario and Aeroplan, a “Major Grant” from the Manitoba Arts Council, and a finalist for the 2011 Sobey Art Award.

- 2012: Manitoba Arts Council Project Grant
- 2012: Canada Council for the Arts, Film and Video Grant
- 2011: Shortlist – Sobey Art Award
- 2009: Special Projects Grant, Manitoba Arts Council, Winnipeg, MB
- 2008: Outstanding Achievement in Art, Canadian Dimension Magazine, Winnipeg, MB
- 2008: Grange Prize, Art Gallery of Ontario/Aeroplan, Toronto, ON
- 2008: Major Grant, Manitoba Arts Council, Winnipeg, MB
- 2007: On the Rise, Winnipeg Arts Council, Winnipeg, MB
- 2007: Travel Grant, Winnipeg Arts Council, Winnipeg, MB
- 2004: Creation/Production Grant, Manitoba Arts Council, Winnipeg, MB
- 2004: Alice Kimball Foundation Travel Grant, Yale School of Art, New Haven, CT
- 2003: Schickle-Collingwood Prize, Yale School of Art, New Haven, CT

=== Residencies ===
Johnson is an international public speaker, lecturer, and teacher. She has completed residencies in 2008 at the Banff Centre in Alberta, and in 2009 at The Arctic Circle Residency in Norway.

== Popular culture ==
Johnson's piece Unclose Me was prominently featured in the 2024 film The Idea of You and served as a plot device.
