= Marina Naprushkina =

Belarusian artist and democracy activist

- Марина Напрушкина
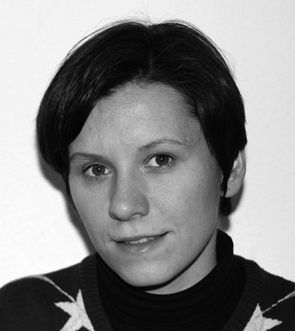
- Born: November 23, 1981 (age 44); Minsk
- Occupations: artist and activist

Marina Naprushkina (Belarusian: Марина Напрушкина, born 23 November 1981) is a Berlin based political artist and campaigner. She is a leading advocate of democratisation in Belarus.

== Life ==
=== Early years ===
Marina Naprushkina was born in Minsk. Between 1997 and 2000 she studied at the city's National Glebov Arts Academy, which she later described as "a very traditional art school", before moving on to the Fine Arts Academy in Karlsruhe. Staying in Germany, she pursued her studies at the Städelschule (fine arts academy) in Frankfurt am Main between 2004 and 2008, where she was taught by Martha Rosler, an American artist whose specialities include video-art and photography, along with installation and performance art.

=== Focus ===
Naprushkina's own work covers installation art, painting and video-art.

She is above all concerned with the political dimensions and scope of art, devoting herself to reworking the power structures in the nation state through the prism of art. She sees Belarus, where she was born, as one example of a contemporary dictatorship, and of how western democracies address the problem it represents. To communicate this she often uses genuine texts, such as propaganda leaflets, produced by institutions that operate under the aegis of the Belarusian government.

== Projects ==
=== Büro für Anti-Propaganda ===
Naprushkina created the "Büro für Anti-Propaganda" in 2007. This is a long-term research and documentation project which investigates how manipulation and control are used to retain power. The Büro für Anti-Propaganda also involves itself in political activity, launching in 2011 "Self # governing", a news journal in Russian and English, which in its first edition elaborated on the ways in which manipulation mechanisms are applied, in order to provide the reader with at least a measure of immunity against them ("....wenigstens ein bisschen dagegen zu immunisieren"). The objective of the newspaper is to develop a future path for Belarus beyond the power blocs of Russia and the European Union, and also to develop alternative state structures worldwide. The Russian language version was widely distributed inside Belarus. The Second edition offered a feminist perspective, containing an analysis of the patriarchal government system in Belarus, showing how women themselves support the structure, but also identifying possible alternatives. This edition became Naprushkina's contribution in the Seventh Berlin Biennale (2012). Despite positive responses, finance for the news journal was exhausted in 2015, and at present it is not clear when the next edition will appear.

In the judgment of Jutta Schwengsbier the "Büro für Anti-Propaganda" has mutated since its inception from an art project into a kernel of political opposition.

=== The President's Platform ===
"The President's Platform" (2007) is a sculpture. It is a copy of the large red podium used on important state occasions by the Belarusian government. According to the lengthy explanatory notice that accompanied it when it was presented at the 2009 Istanbul Biennial, it represents an instrument of propaganda which President Lukashenko and senior colleagues use to build up their importance and to divert attention from political themes. The notice also invited reflection over "the absurdity of this solitary red pedestal [which] reflects on the excessive use of the term 'platform' as an imaginary basis for dialogue and freedom of speech, whilst at the same time this freedom of speech is stifled in most 'democratic' societies". The large podium was also offered as a "stage where subjects that are otherwise suppressed can be discussed and reflected upon in a way that is beyond real politics".

=== My Daddy is a Policeman. What does he do at work? ===
"My Daddy is a Policeman" (2011) applies a colouring book format. It was designed by Marina Naprushkina and then printed and distributed via activists across Belarus by a non-government organisation called "Nash Dom" ("Наш Дом" / "Our house". It was also displayed at an exhibition, with spare copies of the work, on which visitors were invited to draw, attached to the wall.

== Recognition ==
=== Bursaries and scholarships ===
The artist's work has been supported by scholarships and bursaries domestically and overseas. In 1999 she received the scholarship of the President of Belarus. In 2007 she received a scholarship from the Rhineland Palatinate Culture foundation, under the headline "The Russians are coming", enabling her to spend a month in Bad Ems at the Schloss Balmoral Arts Centre. In 2013 her work was recognised with a visual arts stipendium from the Senate of Berlin, and in the same year she also benefitted from a stipendium from the Paul Klee Centre in Bern.

=== Prizes ===
In 2000 she was a recipient of the City of Minsk's Art Prize. In November 2015 Marina Naprushkina's artistic work earned her a €5,000 prize from the Anni und Heinrich Sussmann Foundation in Vienna.

=== Reactions in Minsk ===
Naprushkina's art is considered controversial in Belarus. Displaying it there has been forbidden since 2012 or earlier. However, she has found ways to exhibit in the country of her birth in privately operated gallery spaces, although works exhibited are chosen selectively in order to try to avoid attracting major conflicts with officialdom.

It was only under tightly restricted conditions that arrangements were made for Naprushkina's video-film "Wohlstand für alle" to be shown in Minsk in the Ў-gallery as part of the "West of East" exhibition which was one of several displays organised by the Goethe Institute as part of a series called "Europe (to the power of) n". In the end the Goethe Institute's office in Minsk withdrew their support before the exhibition opened, and several visitors threatens to report the critical production as a breach of public order.

== Refugee support ==
In August 2013, after visiting a refugee hostel in Berlin-Moabit, Naprushkina founded the Moabit New Neighbourhoods initiative ("Initiative Neue Nachbarschaft Moabit"). The support organisation offers language tuition, childcare and sports courses for refugees.

The company "Gierso Boardinghaus" worked with the initiative until a falling out at the end of 2013 after the organisers went public with allegations of major abuses at the property. Early in 2015 Naprushkina filed a complaint against Gierso, alleging that services had not been provided as stated and invoiced to the city authorities, citing among other things allegedly fictitious personnel costs. Her complaint was also filed against Franz Allert, president of the regional Office for Health and Social Affairs ("Lageso"), alleging that he had failed in his duty properly to regulate the matter. Media interest may have been stirred because the 27 year old boss of "Gierso Boardinghaus" was reported to be Franz Allert's godson. Naprushkina was not alone in giving vent in public to criticism of Franz Allert, who resigned his office at the end of 2015.
