= Saleh Barakat =

Lebanese art dealer

- Born: 1969 (age 56–57); Beirut, Lebanon
- Citizenship: Lebanese
- Occupations: art expert, gallery owner and curator
- Years active: 1991-present
- Known for: Runs Agial Art Gallery and Saleh Barakat Gallery in the Ras Beirut area.

Saleh Barakat (born in 1969 in Beirut, Lebanon) is a Lebanese art expert, gallery owner and curator. He studied at the American University of Beirut and was selected as a Yale World Fellow in 2006. He runs Agial Art Gallery and Saleh Barakat Gallery in the Ras Beirut area, both of which focus on modern and contemporary art from Lebanon and the wider Arab region.

== Career in art ==
Saleh Barakat inaugurated the Agial Art Gallery in 1991, in the immediate aftermath of the Lebanese Civil War. Since then, he has expanded his work and become a leading advocate for modern Arab painters in the art market, with an emphasis on promoting their inclusion in museum collections. He has also contributed to building major art collections in the region. According to The Economist, Barakat has positioned himself as a defender of an Arab perspective within an increasingly international art market.

Saleh Barakat deals with works from established modern artists from Lebanon and the Arab World, such as Saloua Raouda Choucair for whom he organized a retrospective exhibition at the Beirut Exhibition Center. He also represents a generation of younger artists including Oussama Baalbaki, Mohamad Said Baalbaki, Ayman Baalbaki, Abdul Rahman Katanani, Tagreed Darghouth, Tamara Al Samerraei, and Chaza Charefeddine. Ayman Baalbaki's works have achieved significant attention in regional and in international auctions; In April 2011, one of his works was auctioned at US$206,500.

Saleh Barakat is member of the advisory board of the Lebanese American University School of Architecture and Design as well a board member of the Lebanese National Commission for UNESCO (LNCU).

=== Exhibit curation ===
Saleh Barakat, who participated to numerous roundtables and educational programs, has participated in the organization of keystone exhibitions for Lebanese and Middle Eastern Art. In 2007, he co-curated with Sandra Dagher the 1st Lebanese Pavilion at the Venice Biennale. The Pavilion featured a collective exhibition of Fouad Elkoury, Lamia Joreige, Walid Sadek, Mounira Al Solh, and Akram Zaatari.

In 2009, he curated The Road to Peace: Paintings in Times of War at Beirut Art Center. The exhibition featured paintings, photographs, drawings, prints and sculptures by Lebanese artists during the war. Its title comes from a series of prints by Aref Rayess that depict Lebanese survivors of war. The Road to Peace featured Rafic Charaf, Fouad Elkoury, Paul Guiragossian, Hassan Al-Jundi, Samir Khaddage, Seta Manoukian, Saloua Raouda Choucair, Mohammad Rawas, Aref Rayess and others.

Barakat has been appointed to manage a museum project at the American University of Beirut. This project follows a donation by Dr Samir Saleeby, who happens to be a relative of the late Khalil Saleeby (1870-1928), a pioneer of Lebanese painting, and consists of 30 paintings from Saleeby himself and Saliba Douaihy, César Gemayel and Omar Onsi.

In the year 2018, he had curated for artists such as Abdul Rahman Katanani, Ayman Baalbaki, Mohammad Rawas, Mona Saudi, Nabil Nahas, Saloua Raouda Schoukair, Shafic Abboud, and Tagreed Dargouth.

== Curated exhibitions ==
- 2002 - Ateliers Arabes, 9th Francophonie Summit Art Exhibition, Beirut
- 2007 - Pavilion of Lebanon (with Sandra Dagher), Venice Biennale
- 2009 - The Road to Peace: Paintings in Times of War, 1975–1991, Beirut Art Center
- 2009 - Mediterranean Crossroad
- 2010 - De lumière et de sang, Foundation Audi, Beirut
- 2011 - Saloua Raouda Choucair, Beirut Exhibition Center
- 2012 - Shafic Abboud (with Nadine Begdache), Beirut Exhibition Center
- 2014 - Michel Basbous, Beirut Exhibition Center
