= Adela Neffa =

Argentine-born Uruguayan sculptress (1922–2019)

Adela Neffa (June 15, 1922 – June 9, 2019) was an Argentine-born Uruguayan sculptor.

== Biography ==
Of Lebanese origin, Neffa and her parents moved from Argentina to Montevideo, Uruguay.

In 1942 she was admitted to the Escuela de Artes Plásticas in Montevideo. She left in 1949 and began a course with professor Heber Ramos Paz.

This was followed by sculpture courses with professors Severino Pose, Armando González and Eduardo Yepes at the Escuela Nacional de Bellas Artes from where she graduated in 1955.

In 1961, she won the Carlos María Herrera municipal scholarship through a merit contest, with which she traveled to Europe in 1962 and studied sculpture at the École nationale supérieure des Beaux-Arts in Paris with the sculptor George Adams.

In 1963, Neffa worked in the Taller (studio) of Michel Basbous and Alfred Basbous in Lebanon.

From 1966 to 1982 Neffa taught sculpture at the Escuela de Artes aplicadas of the Universidad del Trabajo del Uruguay in Montevideo.
