= Basbous =

Basbous is a surname. Notable people with the surname include:

- Alfred Basbous (1924–2006), Lebanese artist and sculptor
- Michel Basbous (1921–1981), Lebanese sculptor and painter
