= Sursock Museum =

Modern and contemporary art museum in Beirut, Lebanon

- قصر سرسق
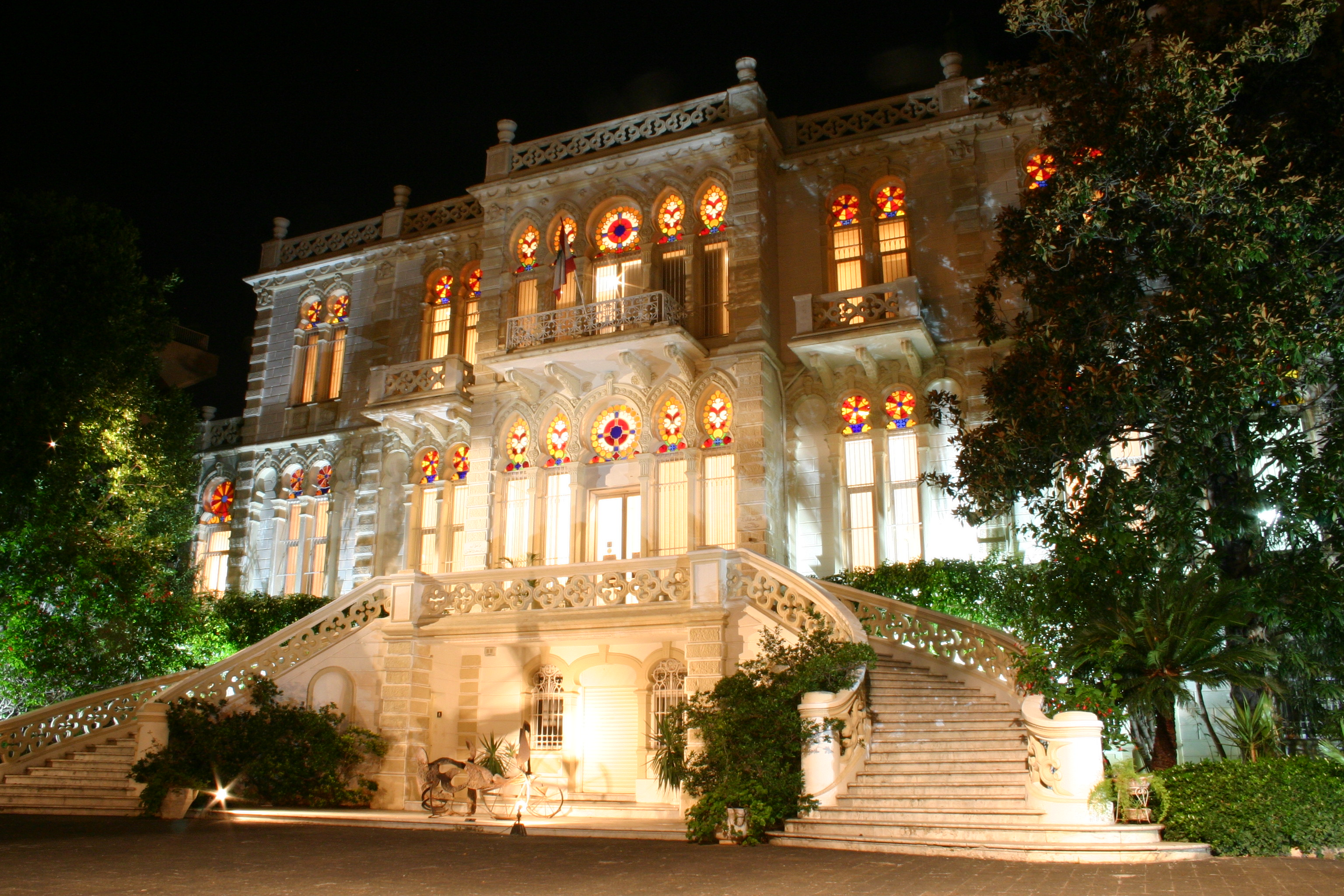
- The Sursock Museum in Beirut
- Established: 1961
- Location: Beirut, Lebanon
- Coordinates: 33°53′34.59″N 35°30′58.42″E
- Type: Modern art and contemporary art
- Website: sursock.museum

The Sursock Museum (Arabic: قصر سرسق), officially known as the Nicolas Ibrahim Sursock Museum, is a modern and contemporary art museum in Beirut, Lebanon.

== History ==
In 1912, the Lebanese aristocrat Nicolas Ibrahim Sursock built the private villa that now houses the museum. He decreed in his will that the villa be transformed into a museum. When he died in 1952, he bequeathed the villa to the city of Beirut. Between 1953 and 1957, President Camille Chamoun transformed the villa into a palais des hôtes—a presidential guesthouse designated to accommodate visiting heads of state, including the Shah of Iran and King Faisal of Iraq.

The museum opened in 1961, directed by Amine Beyhum, with an exhibit of works of contemporary Lebanese artists, setting a precedent for cultural events in Beirut.

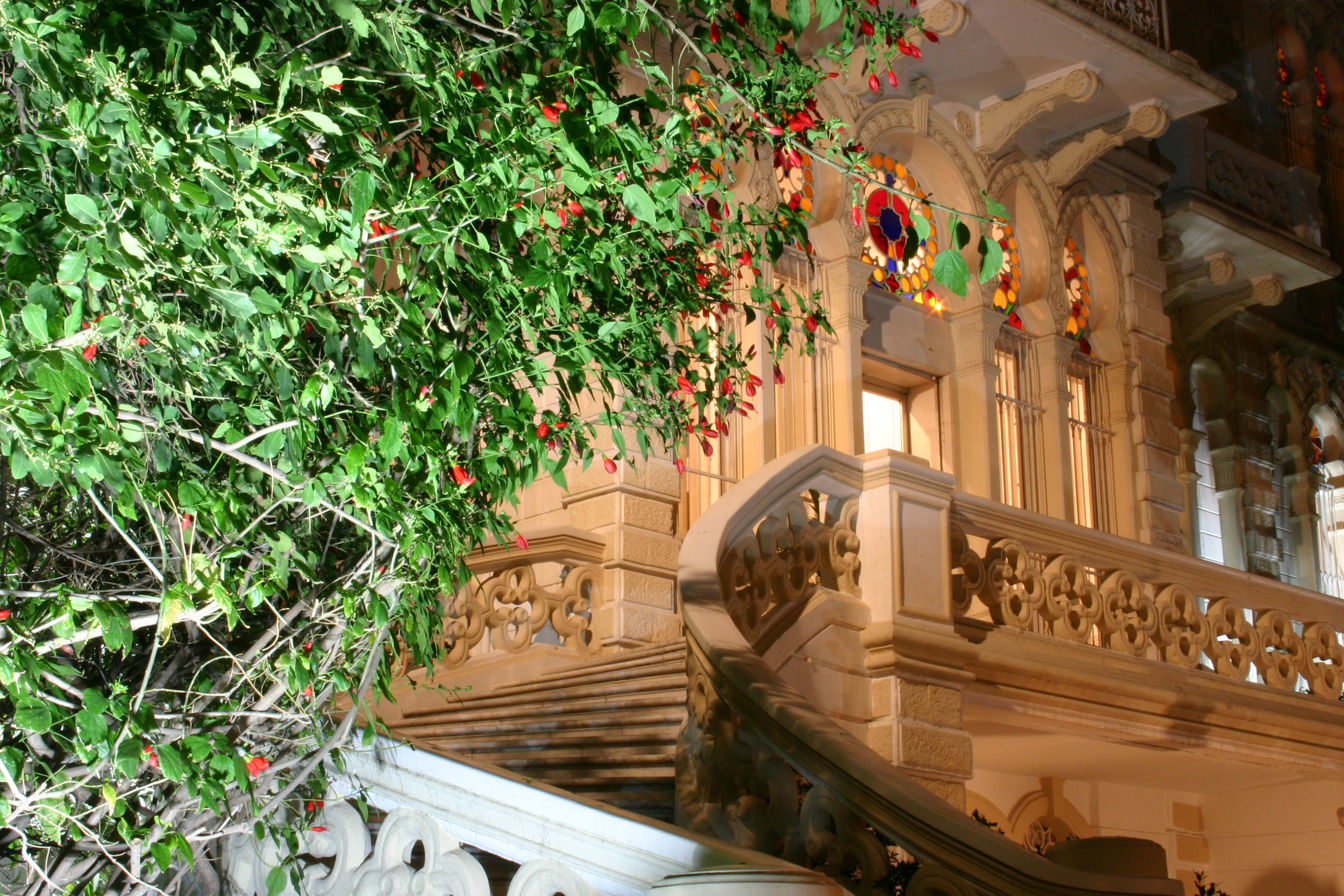
The marble stairs of the museum

The Sursock Museum building exemplifies Lebanese architecture, with its Italianate (specifically Venetian) and Ottoman architectural influences. It is one of the few remaining villas from its epoch in Beirut. It is located in the Rue Sursock in the Rmeil district of Beirut.

More than a hundred exhibitions have been held at the museum, including displays of works by Lebanese and international artists. The museum's permanent collection includes modern art, Japanese engravings and Islamic art. The museum collection consists of over 800 artworks, including paintings, sculptures and graphic arts from the 19th and 20th centuries.

On 4 August 2020, the museum sustained significant damage as a result of a catastrophic ammonium nitrate explosion. 57 artworks were damaged and had to be restored.

The museum was restored thanks to various donors among them the Italian government with a donation of one million euro in May 2021. In total, the museum raised $2.4 million. It finally reopened on 26 May 2023. During the 2024 Israeli invasion of Lebanon, UNESCO gave enhanced protection to 34 cultural sites in Lebanon including the museum to safeguard it from damage. In 2023, the museum’s collection was made up of 1,500 works in its permanent collection and more than 30,000 manuscripts, postcards and photographs. In October 2024, during the Israeli–Lebanese conflict, the museum was closed so that artwork could be removed and stored for safety. The museum reopened on 20 December 2024.

== Expansion ==
The museum was expanded with four new underground floors beneath the current garden, at a cost of US$12 million. French architect Jean-Michel Wilmotte and Lebanese architect Jacques Abou Khaled designed the expansion project.

The project increased the museum's area from 1,500 square meters to 8,500 square meters and opened additional exhibition spaces, a research library, an auditorium, a restoration workshop, new storage spaces for the collection, as well as a store and restaurant. The museum reopened on 8 October 2015.

== Collection ==
The following is a list of Lebanese and international artists whose works are in the museum's permanent collection:

- Chafic Abboud
- Rafic Charaf
- Saloua Raouda Choucair
- Kees van Dongen
- Paul Guiragossian
- Mamdouh Kashlan
- Hussein Madi
- Omar Onsi
- Mohammad Rawas
- Aref Rayess
- Nadia Saikali
- Jean-Marc Nahas
- Juliana Seraphim

== Exhibition history ==
- Hommage à Jean Khalife, 1993
- Omar Onsi Rétrospective, 1997
- Georges Schehadé : poète des deux rives, 1905-1989, 1999
- Max Ernst, 2000
- Sergei Parajanov, collages and drawings, 2000
- Moustafa Farroukh Rétrospective, 2003
- Regards sur Beyrouth, 160 ans d'images, 2015
- Danielle Genadry, The Fall, 2016
- Assadour, landscape in Motion, 2016
- Ali Cherri. A Taxonomy of Fallacies: The Life of Dead Objects, 2016
- Let's Talk About the Weather: Art and Ecology in a Time of Crisis, 2016
- Susan Hiller Magic Lantern, 2016
- Adelita Husni-Bey: A Wave in the Well, 2016
- Fabrik, 2017
- Les mondes de Willy Aractingy, 2017
- Hrair Sarkissian Homesick, 2017
- Partitions et Couleurs : Hommage à Amine El Bacha, 2017
- Fruit of Sleep. Curated by Reem Fadda – Part of Act II program of Tamawuj, Sharjah Biennial 13, 2017
- Monira Al Qadiri: The Craft, 2017
- Joseph Sassine, The Experience of Light, 2018
- Abed Al Kadiri, The Story of the Rubber Tree, 2018
- Cy Twombly Photographs, 2018
- Zad Moultaka: ŠamaŠ
- Fleeting Exits, Curated by Marwan T. Assaf, 2018
- Past Disquiet, Curated by Kristine Khouri and Rasha Salti, 2018
- Gregory Buchakjian Abandoned Dwellings, Display of Systems, Curated by Karina El Helou, 2018
- Laure et Mazen : Correspondance(s), 2019
- La Fabrique des illusions: Collection Fouad Debbas et commentaires contemporains, 2019
- Baalbek, Archives of an Eternity, curated by Vali Mahlouji, 2019
- Picasso et la famille, 2019
- At the still point of the turning world, there is the dance. Curated by Carla Chammas and Rachel Dedman, 2019
- Je Suis Inclute! The Salon d’Automne and the National Canon, 2023
- Beyond Ruptures: A Tentative Chronology, works from Akram Zaatari, Jean Khalife, Saffie Abboud and Aref Rayess, 2023
- Earthy Praxis, 2023
- Beirut Recollections, 2023
- Remembering the Light, by Joana Hadjithomas and Khalil Joreige, 2025
- DIVA: From Umm Kulthum to Dalida, with the Arab World Institute, 2025-2026
- Tribute to Abdel Hamid Baalbaki, 2025-2026

== See also ==
- Sursock family
- Sursock House
