= Ayman Baalbaki =

Lebanese painter

- Born: 1975 (age 50–51); Odaisseh, Lebanon
- Occupation: Lebanese painter
- Known for: Expressionist works depicting warriors with veils or casks as a symbol of the endless conflict in the Middle East

Ayman Baalbaki (Arabic: أيمن بعلبكي; born 1975) is a Lebanese painter. He studied at the Lebanese University and at the École nationale supérieure des arts décoratifs in Paris. His large-scale expressionist portraits of fighters made him one of the most popular young Arab artists.

== Painting ==
Born the year the civil war started in Lebanon, Ayman Baalbaki draws most of his inspiration from these events. His paintings often depict destroyed buildings, sometimes occupied by refugees who were forced to leave their homes during the combats. After the 2006 Lebanon War he drew series of scattered structures related to the demolitions consecutive to the bombings of Beirut's southern suburbs.

Ayman Baalbaki's most popular series depict warriors bearing veils or casks. These portraits of anonymous figures became a symbol of the endless conflicts in the Middle East. These paintings have been widely exhibited worldwide, including the 2011 Venice Biennale. In 2012, Baalbaki participated in Hoods for Heritage, a project consisting of 16 Porsche 911 hoods transformed into art works by artists and designer and auctioned on benefit of the Beirut National Museum.

== Installation works ==
Although better known as a painter, Ayman Baalbaki produced notable installation works. While at École nationale supérieure des arts décoratifs, he presented Les Frigos (2001) a container enclosing a luggage. Nomadism is a recurrent theme in his work and will appear in more recent works such as Destination X, that was featured in Arabicity (2010) an exhibition curated by Rose Issa in Liverpool’s Bluecoat and Beirut’s Beirut Exhibition Center. Destination X is an old Mercedes-Benz red car, reminding Lebanon’s antique taxis service, loaded with a mountain of luggage as a symbol of the upheaval caused by the war.

== Auctions ==
Ayman Baalbaki, who is represented by Saleh Barakat's Agial Art Gallery in Beirut has witnessed growing success in auction sales: In March 2009, a Abel was presented at an Auction Doha with an estimate of US$20,000–30,000 and was sold for $60,000. In October 2009, an untitled painting was proposed Dubai for US$15,000–20,000 and was sold for $74,500. In April 2011, Let A Thousand Flowers Bloom was proposed, also in Dubai, for US$50,000–70,000 and was hammered for $206,500. In April 2013, a new record was set as "Ya'ilahi" (Dear Lord) went to US$377,000 at Sotheby's. In March 2014, A large painting entitled "Babel" was presented at Christies with an estimation of $150,000–200,000; It realized $485,000.

== Awards ==
- Empreintes (first prize), organized by Maraya Gallery and Lebanese Ministry of Culture and Higher Education, Beirut, Lebanon, 1996
- Cm ³(first prices), CIUP, France, 2003
- Jeux de la francophonie 2005 Silver Medal (painting), Niamey, Niger

== Publications ==
- Ayman Baalbaki, Transfiguration Apocalyptique, Agial Art Gallery 2008
- Can one man save the (art world), Georges Rabbath and Nayla Tamraz, Alarm Editions 2009
- Beirut and Again and Again, edited by Rose Issa, Beyond Art Productions, 2012

== Selected exhibitions ==
=== Solo exhibitions ===
- Transfiguration Apocalyptique, Agial Art Gallery, Beirut 2008
- Ceci n'est pas la Suisse, Rose Issa Projects, London, 2009
- Beirut Again and Again, Rose Issa Projects, London, 2011
- Recent Works, Rose Issa Projects, London, 2014
- Blowback, Saleh Barakat Gallery, Beirut, 2016

=== Group exhibitions ===
- Contemporary Art Encounter: Imagining the Book, Bibliotheca Alexandrina, Alexandria, 2002.
- CM3, Cité Internationale Universitaire, Paris, 2003
- Thirty: Ayman Baalbaki and Sheelagh Colcough, Studio 4-11, Belfast, 2005
- Bos Iaf, Sabanci University, Kasa Art Gallery, Istanbul 2008
- Re-orientations, European Parliament, Brussels, 2008
- Rafia Gallery, Damascus, 2009
- Arabicity, Bluecoat Arts Centre, Liverpool and Beirut Exhibition Center, 2010
- Nujoom: Constellations of Arab art, The Farjam Collection at Dubai International Financial Centre, Dubai, 2010
- The Future of a Promise, 54th Venice Biennale, 2012
- Re-orientations II, Rose Issa Projects, London 2012
- Traits d’Union – Paris et l’art contemporain arabe, Villa Emerige, Paris, 2011
- Art is the answer! Contemporary Lebanese artists and designers, Villa Empain, Brussels, 2012
- Ourouba: The eye of Lebanon, Beirut Art Fair, 2017
- Across Boundaries. Focus on Lebanese Photography, curated by Tarek Nahas, Beirut Art Fair 2018
- Arabicity, MEI Gallery Washington DC, 2019
