= Rafic Charaf =

Lebanese painter

- Born: 1932; Baalbek, Lebanon
- Died: 2003 (aged 70–71); Beirut, Lebanon
- Education: Académie Libanaise des Beaux-Arts; Real Academia de Bellas Artes de San Fernando
- Known for: Painting

Rafic Charaf (Baalbek, Lebanon, 1932 – Beirut 2003) was a Lebanese painter. He studied at the Académie Libanaise des Beaux-Arts ALBA and, in

1955, obtained a scholarship from the Spanish government and went at the Real Academia de Bellas Artes de San Fernando in Madrid before returning to Lebanon.

== Life and work ==
Grown up in a poor neighborhood, Charaf pioneered an expressionistic style of painting, covering a range of themes including contemporary political issues, social struggles of his native Baalbek and folk art and poetry.

Charaf appeared as a visionary and pessimistic artist when, in the early 1960s, he depicted lugubrious landscapes, often outfitted by wires and dead trees. He always showed social and political involvement in his art, so that when the Lebanese Civil War broke up, he produced posters devoted to the National Resistance. Charaf eventually made during this period more personal drawings in which he interpreted his feelings about the tragedy that shook his country. Two of these drawings were part of The Road to Peace, an exhibition Saleh Barakat curated in 2009 at the Beirut Art Center, encompassing Lebanese visual arts between 1975 and 1991. In the years following the beginning of the war, Charaf drifted into an opposite direction, working with gold leaf on icons inspired by Byzantine and Oriental religious mosaics and paintings.

Rafic Charaf always showed interest on popular culture from his native region and elsewhere in the region. Inspired by oral history and tradition and folklore, he created a series of paintings depicting the epics of the Arab poet and hero Antar and his cousin, Abla, with whom he fell in love and married her.

== Selected exhibitions ==
=== Solo exhibitions ===
- Body and Space, Planula Elissar, Beirut, 1981
- Antar wa Abla, Galerie Damo, Antelias, Lebanon, 1978
- Charaf, Contact Gallery, Beirut, 1975
- Charaf, Contact Gallery, Beirut, 1974
- Of Men and Horses, Contact Gallery, Beirut, 1973
- Forgotten Land, Carlton Hotel, Beirut, 1964
- Unesco Palace, 1961

=== Group exhibitions ===
- Baalbek, Archives of an Eternity, Sursock Museum, 2019
- Art from Lebanon, Beirut Exhibition Center, 2012
- De Lumière et de Sang, Foundation Audi, Beirut, 2010
- The Road to Peace, Beirut Art Center, 2009
- Landscapes.Cityscapes.1 – Maqam Art Gallery, Beirut, 2009
- Biennale de Paris, 1965
- 3rd Unesco Salon, Beirut, 1955

== Awards ==
- Prix de l'Île-de-France, 1963
- Ministry of Education of Lebanon, 1st Prize, 1959
