= Shafic Abboud =

Shafic (or Chafic) Abboud (1926 in Mhaidseh, near Bikfaya, Lebanon – 2004 in Paris, France) was a Lebanese painter. He studied at the Académie Libanaise des Beaux-Arts ALBA and left to Paris in 1947. Although he spent most of his life in France, he is considered as one of the most influential Lebanese artists of the 20th century.

== Life and work ==
When Shafic Abboud arrived in Paris, he was immersed in the modernist and abstract tendencies of painting prevailing in the mid 20th century. He worked in the ateliers of Jean Metzinger, Othon Friesz, Fernand Léger and André Lhote before pursuing his studies at the École nationale supérieure des Beaux-Arts. These encounters, as well as his personal appreciation of Pierre Bonnard, Roger Bissière and Nicolas de Staël led him to move from a Lebanese tradition of figurative and landscape painting to a colorful personal abstraction.

Abboud remained attached to his oriental roots, remembering oral storytelling from his grandmother as well as Byzantine icons in churches that would eventually radiate in his works. Apart from painting, Abboud showed interest in other medias including ceramics, terracotta, carpets and lithography. He illustrated writing by poems such as Adonis and produced important books on art.

Abboud's work has been widely recognized. He was part of Sajjil: A Century of Modern Art, the inauguration exhibition of Doha's Mathaf: Arab Museum of Modern Art. In 2011, the Paris-based Institut du Monde Arabe showed a retrospective of his work. Another comprehensive exhibition curated by Claude Lemand, Nadine Begdache and Saleh Barakat took place in May 2012 at the Beirut Exhibition Center.

== Auctions ==
Shafic Abboud's works are highly demanded on the fine art market and have frequently seen their prices rise above US$100,000. His personal record is Chambre - La serviette bleue, 1977, a triptych proposed in 2007 with an estimation of US$120,000–150,000. It realized a price of $265,000. One year later, La Cathedrale was auctioned with a very high estimation of US$130,000–180,000 and was sold for $134,500. In October 2010, an Untitled painting was proposed for US$60,000–80,000 and was sold for $146,500. In October 2011, L'Amour en noir fleuri was hammered at US$122,500 and an untitled painting went for GBP67,250, thus doubling its estimation. In April 2013, a painting entitled "Le chemin d'Alep" realized US$387,750 after a $200,000–250,000 estimation.

== Awards ==
- Prix du Musée Sursock, Beirut, 1964
- Prix Victor Choquet, Ministère des finances, France, 1961

== Publications ==
- Shafic Abboud. First Monograph, edited and published by Claude Lemand, Editions CLEA, Paris, 2006.
- Shafic Abboud. Catalogue of the Retrospective, edited and published by Claude Lemand, Editions CLEA, Paris, 2011.
- Shafic ABBOUD. Monograph, Pascale Le Thorel, Editions Skira, 2014. – ISBN 978-88-572-2393-3

== Selected exhibitions ==
=== Solo exhibitions ===
- Shafic Abboud, Peintures et lithographies, 1957–2002, Galerie Claude Lemand, Paris, 2013.
- Shafic Abboud Retrospective, Beirut Exhibition Center, Beirut, Lebanon, 2012
- Shafic Abboud Retrospective, Institut du Monde Arabe, Paris, France, 2011
- Peintures dans les collections européennes, 1954–2003, Espace Claude Lemand, Paris, 2010.
- Pieces for a Museum (with Paul Guiragossian), Loft 46, Beirut Lebanon, 2010
- Un parcours 1960–2002 : Huiles, Temperas, Lithographies. Galerie Claude Lemand, Paris, 2006,
- Hommage à Chafic Abboud, Galerie Claude Lemand, Paris, 2004
- Petits formats : cent six peintures, Galerie Claude Lemand, Paris, 2003
- Peintures récentes, Galerie Claude Lemand, Paris, 2002
- Galerie Jeanine Rubeiz, Beirut, Lebanon, 1999
- Peintures récentes, Galerie Claude Lemand, Paris, France, 1998.
- Les Robes de Simone, Galerie Claude Lemand, Paris, France, 1997.
- Galerie Jeanine Rubeiz, Beirut, Lebanon, 1994
- Gallery Contact, Beirut, Lebanon 1978
- Galerie Brigitte Schehadé, Paris, France, 1977
- M.L. de Boer, Amsterdam, Netherlands, 1975
- Centre d'Art, Beirut, Lebanon, 1972
- Galerie Manoug, Beirut, Lebanon, 1970
- Dar El Fan, Beirut, Lebanon, 1969
- Centre d'Art, Beirut, Lebanon, 1965
- Galerie Dorethea Loehr, Frankfurt, Germany, 1964
- Galerie Raymonde Cazenave, Paris, France, 1961
- Galerie Domus, Beirut, Lebanon, 1959
- Galerie de Beaune, Paris, France, 1955
- French Cultural Center, Beirut, Lebanon, 1950

=== Group exhibitions ===
- Art from Lebanon, Beirut Exhibition Center, 2012
- Sajjil: A Century of Modern Art, Mathaf: Arab Museum of Modern Art, Doha, 2010
