= Abdul Rahman Katanani =

Palestinian artist

Abdul Rahman Katanani (also Abdulrahman Katanani; Arabic: عبد الرحمن قطناني, romanized: ʻAbd al-Raḥmān qṭnāny) is a Palestinian sculptor. He was born and lives in Sabra refugee camp near Beirut, Lebanon. Katanani is a third generation Palestinian refugee; his grandparents left Yazour—a small town now called Azor—in Jaffa during the 1948 Palestinian exodus.

== Early life ==
Abdul Rahman Katanani was born in 1983, nine months after the Sabra & Shatila massacre. His first works of art were political cartoons, much inspired by Palestinian cartoonist and political critic, Naji al-Ali. In 2008 he received a Special Mention and in 2009 he received the Young Artist Prize during Salon d'Automne held by Sursock Museum in Beirut.

== Education ==
Katanani attended the Lebanese University in Beirut where he received a Diploma and Masters of Fine Arts. He has been a resident artist at Cité internationale des arts in Paris, France. In 2016, he was a resident artist at Centre d'Art de Nanterre in Paris, France.

== Work ==
Katanani makes his art out of various materials such as scrap metal and barbed wire that he sources from within the camp. His artwork has sold in auctions by Christie's.

In 2016, Artnet News called Katanani one of "the strongest mid-career artists in the Arab world".

In 2012 AbdulRahman Katanani and his work were featured in Christophe Donner's French documentary “Le Lanceur de Pierres رامي الحجارة” (The Stone Thrower).

== Collection ==
Katanani's piece, "With Her Nephew, Ahmad" is a part of the permanent collection of Barjeel Art Foundation.

== Exhibitions ==
Katanani has held solo exhibitions and participated in group exhibitions in multiple countries. Some of them include:

=== Solo exhibitions ===
- 2016 "Children, Olive Trees & Barbed Wire", Al Markhiya Gallery; Doha, Qatar
- 2015 "Softness of a Circle, Knife Edge of a Straight Line", Agial Art Gallery; Beirut, Lebanon
- 2014 "Kids, Barbed Wire, and a Dream", Tanit Gallery; Munich, Germany
- 2012 "No Address", French Institute, Beirut, Lebanon.
- 2011 "Zinc, Barbed Wire, and Freedom", Agial Art Gallery; Beirut, Lebanon

=== Group exhibitions ===
- 2016 "Jardin d'Orient", Arab World Institute; Paris, France
- 2014 My Beautiful Laundrette", Cite International des Arts; Paris, France
- 2012 "Together We Connect", Anima Gallery; Doha, Gallery
- 2011 "Rebirth"; Beirut Exhibition Center; Beirut, Lebanon
- 2011 "Isharat", Al Markhiya Gallery; Doha, Qatar
- 2009 Abu Dhabi Art
- 2009 Penang State Museum and Art Gallery; Penang, Malaysia
