= Nabil Nahas =

- Born: 18 September 1949 (age 76); Beirut, Lebanon
- Occupation: Lebanese painter
- Known for: Fractal painting

Nabil Nahas (born 18 September 1949) is a Lebanese artist and painter living in New York.

== Biography ==
Nabil grew up in Cairo and Beirut, before moving to the United States for college to study at Louisiana State University. He is the younger brother of the Lebanese/Brazilian businessman Naji Nahas. He earned a BFA in 1971 and an MFA from Yale University in 1973. Encounters with contemporary painters at Yale influenced Nahas to move to New York after graduation.

== Painting career ==
He exhibited regularly at important New York galleries and received critical acclaim for his work. Usually working "in" an abstract idiom, Nahas repeatedly reinvented himself.

Nahas’ paintings have made use of geometric motifs and decorative patterns inspired Levantine art architecture. Nahas also employs traditional Western abstract painting, pointillistic and impressionistic techniques. Sometimes he combines these traditions in brightly colored paintings, suggestive of the richness of nature and of the imagination. One of Nahas’ motifs is starfish, sometimes cast in acrylic paint, on top of which he layered high-chroma acrylic paint.

In his most recent work, Nahas introduced recognizable Lebanese cedar, pine and olive trees in his most direct references yet to his native land. In 2018, Nahas was commissioned to produce a cedar painting to be featured on a new stamp in Lebanon.

== Exhibition history ==
=== Solo exhibitions ===
- 1973 Yale University, Connecticut
- 1977 Ohio State University, Ohio
- 1978 Robert Miller Gallery, New York
- 1979 Robert Miller Gallery, New York
- 1980 Robert Miller Gallery, New York
- 1987 Holly Solomon Gallery, New York
- 1988 Galerie Montenay, Paris
- 1988 Holly Solomon Gallery, New York
- 1994 Baldwin Gallery, Aspen, Colorado
- 1997 Sperone Westwater, New York
- 1998 Baumgartner Galleries, Washington, DC
- 1998 Milleventi, Milan
- 1999 Sperone Westwater, New York
- 2002 25th Bienal De São Paulo
- 2002 J. Johnson Gallery, Jacksonville Beach, Florida
- 2005 Galerie Xippas, Paris
- 2005 Sperone Westwater, New York
- 2009 Galerie Tanit, Munich, Germany
- 2010 FIAF Gallery, New York
- 2010 Beirut Exhibition Center (BEC), Beirut, Lebanon
- 2011 Lawrie Shabibi Gallery, Dubai, United Arab Emirates
- 2011 Ben Brown Fine Arts, London, England
- 2013 Sperone Westwater
- 2013 Lawrie Shabibi, Dubai, UAE
- 2014 Ben Brown Fine Arts, London
- 2016 Saleh Barakat Gallery, Beirut, Lebanon
- 2019 Saleh Barakat Gallery, Beirut, Lebanon
