= Rasha Salti =

Canadian researcher, writer and producer

Rasha Salti (born 1969, Toronto) is a researcher, writer, producer, and curator of art and film. She lives and works between Beirut and Berlin. Salti co-curated many film programs at public institutions, including ArteEast, Lincoln Center and Museum of Modern Art in New York, and collaborated with film festivals as a programmer, such as the Abu Dhabi International Film Festival and Toronto International Film Festival. Since 2017, she is the commissioning editor for La Lucarne at ArteFrance, a program dedicated to Auteur documentaries. Her curatorial projects were exhibited at numerous international public institutions, including Barcelona Museum of Contemporary Art, Haus der Kulturen der Welt in Berlin, Museo de la Solidaridad Salvador Allende in Santiago de Chile, the Sursock Museum in Beirut.

== Education ==
Salti grew up in Beirut. She holds an M.A. in Liberal Studies from the Graduate Faculty at the New School for Social Research, New York (2000) and a B.A. in Fine Arts from Georgetown University (1992).

== Programming and curating ==
Salti's involvement with film programming started at the Théâtre de Beyrouth, an independent cultural space in the post-war Beirut. She organized several cultural events, such as "Image Quest," the first film and video festival in postwar Lebanon (with Moukhtar Kocache) (1995), "For a Critical Culture," a tribute to Edward Said (1997), "50, Nakba and Resistance," a series of events that commemorated Nakba in Palestine (1998), and two editions of Home Works at Ashkal Alwan.

Between 2004–10, Salti worked as the film programmer and creative director of ArteEast in New York. In 2005, she became the director of CinemaEast Film Festival in New York, focusing on the Middle East, North Africa, and their diasporas. Her projects include 10th Sharjah Biennial (co-curated with Suzanne Cotter and Haig Aivazian), Sharjah (2011), Mapping Subjectivity: Experimentation in Arab Cinema from the 1960s until Now (co-curated with Jytte Jensen) at MoMA, New York (2010–12), and The Road to Damascus (co-curated with Richard Peña) at the Film Society at Lincoln Center and other venues in Africa and the Middle East (2006–08).

Salti's research-driven practice investigates canons in cultural histories. She is the co-founder (with Kristine Khouri) of the History of Arab Modernities in the Visual Arts Study Group, a research platform focused on the social history of art in the Arab world. Salti is the co-curator of the exhibition Past Disquiet: Narratives and Ghosts from the Exhibition of International Art for Palestine (Beirut, 1978) (with Kristine Khouri), which was hosted at the Barcelona Museum of Contemporary Art (MACBA) (2015), the Haus der Kulturen der Welt in Berlin (2016), the Museo de la Solidaridad Salvador Allende (MSSA) in Santiago de Chile (2018), the Sursock Museum (2018) and Framer Framed (2025) in Amsterdam, the Netherlands. This project is the result of a decade-long research that explores the artistic networks of international solidarity from Palestine to Chile, South Africa to Japan in the 1960 to the 1980s.

Salti is also the co-curator of the exhibition Saving Bruce Lee: African and Arab Cinema in the Era of Soviet Cultural Diplomacy (with Koyo Kouoh), organized at Haus der Kulturen der Welt in Berlin and at Garage Museum of Contemporary Art in Moscow in 2015. This research-driven exhibition focuses on three generations of African and Arab filmmakers who studied in the USSR.

== Writing ==
Salti’s articles and essays have appeared in The Jerusalem Quarterly Report, Naqd, MERIP, The London Review of Books, Afterall, and Third Text, as well as several anthologies dedicated to film, art and culture. In 2018, she co-edited with Kristine Khouri, Past Disquiet: Artists, International Solidarity and Museums in Exile, published by the Museum of Modern Art, Warsaw. In 2011 and 2012, she acted as the guest-editor of the Manifesta Journal for issues number 14, 15, and 16. In 2010, she co-edited I Would Have Smiled: A Tribute to Myrtle Winter-Chaumeny with Issam Nassar, a book dedicated to the legacy of the founder of the UNRWA. In 2009, she collaborated with photographer Ziad Antar on an exhibition and book titled Beirut Bereft, The Architecture of the Forsaken and Map of the Derelict. In 2006, she edited Insights into Syrian Cinema: Essays and Conversations with Filmmakers (ArteEast and Rattapallax Press).
