= Mamdouh Kashlan =

Syrian painter (1929–2022)

Mamdouh Kashlan (1929 – 29 August 2022) was a Syrian painter. He studied at the Accademia di Belle Arti di Roma in Rome, Italy from 1952 to 1959, where he obtained a diploma with a specialization in painting. He held more than 300 exhibitions in Syria and around the world and many of his paintings are on display in the National Museums of Damascus, Aleppo and Deir Atieh, as well as in the Presidential Palace. His work is also on display in the Sursock Museum in Beirut, Lebanon, Modern Art Museum in Cairo, Egypt and has been displayed in Sofia, Bulgaria, Paris, France, and Seinajoki, Finland. In 1996, he was awarded the pioneers prize from the Syrian Ministry of Culture. Kashlan was born in Damascus in 1929. He died there on 29 August 2022.
