= Paul Guiragossian =

Paul Guiragossian Փօլ Կիրակոսեան
- Paul Guiragossian (c. 1990), photographed by his son, Jean-Paul
- Born: Paul Guiragossian; December 25, 1926; Jerusalem, Mandatory Palestine
- Died: November 20, 1993 (aged 67); Beirut, Lebanon
- Known for: Painter
- Spouse: Juliette
- Children: Silva, Emmanuel, Araxie, Jean Paul, Manuella

Paul Guiragossian (December 25, 1926 - November 20, 1993) was an Armenian-Palestinian artist from Jerusalem known for expressive paintings that often explored themes of identity and conflict. His works are characterized by the use of human figures, bold colors, and strong abstract brushstrokes.

Guiragossian's art often portrayed the suffering of individuals experiencing political and social turmoil. In Lebanon, he received one of the country's highest national honors, the Medal of the National Order of the Cedar, becoming one of the most celebrated and influential artists of his time until his death on November 20, 1993, in Beirut.

== Biography ==
Born in Jerusalem to Armenian parents, who were survivors of the Armenian genocide, Paul Guiragossian experienced the consequences of exile from a very tender age. Sent to Catholic missionary boarding schools from the age of four, Guiragossian grew up away from his mother who had to work to ensure her two sons received an education, and his father, who was a blind fiddle player.

In the early 1940s, Guiragossian and his family moved to Jaffa, where he attended Studio Yarkon (1944 - 1945) to study painting. In 1948, the family moved again and settled in Lebanon.

In the 1950s, Guiragossian started teaching art in several Armenian schools and worked as an illustrator. Later he started his own business with his brother Antoine, where they painted cinema banners, created posters, and illustrated books. In time, he became connected with the contemporary art scene in Lebanon, and he began exhibiting his works in Beirut and eventually all over the world.

In 1956, Guiragossian won the first prize in a painting competition, and he was duly awarded a scholarship to study at the Accademia di Belle Arti di Firenze (The Academy of Fine Arts of Florence). While in Florence, he had multiple exhibitions starting with a solo show in 1958 at the Galeria D'Arte Moderna "La Permanente".

In 1961, Guiragossian returned to Beirut. In 1962, Guiragossian was granted another scholarship, this time by the French Government, to study and paint at Les Atelier Des Maîtres De L'Ecole De Paris and by the end of that year he had a solo exhibition at the La Galerie Mouffe.

By the mid-1960s, Guiragossian had become one of Lebanon's most celebrated artists and eventually of the Arab world. When war broke out in 1975, Guiragossian's dedication to Lebanon only increased and his works correspondingly became more colorful and were imbued with messages of hope.

In 1989, Guiragossian moved to Paris with part of his family and remained there until 1991. In 1989, Guiragossian exhibited his works in La Salle Des Pas Perdus at the UNESCO Headquarters in Paris. In 1991, he had a solo exhibition at the Institut du Monde Arabe, which was the first solo show at the IMA for any artist and was extended beyond its original slot.

Guiragossian died on November 20, 1993, in Beirut. That morning, after completing an oil painting, he revealed to his daughter that he finally achieved what he always wanted, merging the old and the new in one painting. The family agreed to title the painting "L'Adieu" and it remains - unsigned - in the Guiragossian family collection. His works are in several museum collections such the National Gallery of Armenia, The British Museum in London, Centre Pompidou in Paris, Mathaf Modern in Qatar among many others.

== Influences ==
Many aspects of Guiragossian's art style can be traced back to parts of his childhood and identity. His early paintings are characterized by distinctive features inspired by his formative years in Jerusalem and the people from his Bourj Hammoud environment. The composition of his work reflected that of religious paintings, with human features often obscured by dark shadows and contrasting flashes of light. The illuminating of the central figure, much like halos do to saintly heads, reflected the religious influence that affected his art from his formative years at Sisters of Charity of St. Paul de Vence.

Guiragossian was part of the first generation of Palestinian refugees whose careers unfolded in Beirut. Until the Siege of Beirut in 1982, the city was widely considered the cultural hub of the Arab world. Its vibrant, open pluralist environment fostered a thriving artistic community, drawing together creators from various disciplines. Guiragossian was known to frequent soirées at the Horseshoe Cafe in Beirut, where he met and traded ideas with other Ras Beirut artists such as Etel Adnan, Saloua Choucair, Aref El Rayess, Mona Saudi, and Juliana Seraphim. Since these artists worked in what was regarded as the cultural center of Beirut, they were exposed to a variety of influences, and were well informed of Western artistic trends. As a result, these artists shared common themes that were more experimental and personal, reflecting international trends.

== Style ==
Guiragossian's art features long, vertical brush strokes on paper and canvas, primarily in oil, watercolor, and pen. These brushstrokes, emblematic of his style, depicted the bodies of his figures as abstract and elongated, echoing the imagery of Byzantine icons and moving between abstraction and figuration to capture the essence of the human form. During his 30 years in Beirut, Guiragossian's art style transitioned from figurative to abstract. His later paintings often depict frontal groups and erect figures, recapturing the vertical staging of Christ's apostles. His colors became more vivid, and the figures were reduced to slashes of thick paint. His art is mainly concerned with the human figure, especially that of mother and child. He often painted his wife and children, self-portraits, and anonymous figures. Guiragossian's art reflects themes common in Palestinian art, including motherhood, spirituality, exile, and labor. The themes of exile and spirituality are especially prominent in his work, demonstrating a longing for a homeland he cannot return to and the generational burden of exile.

== Awards and honors ==
Paul Guiragossian received numerous prestigious awards and honors throughout his art career, beginning with his early recognition in the 1950s. In 1956, he won the First Prize at the Académie Libanaise des Beaux-Arts (ALBA) in Beirut and was also awarded the Florence Prize by the Italian Cultural Institute in the same city. The following year, in 1957, he received a gold medal at the International Exhibitions at the Galleria d'Arte Moderna La Permanente in Florence, Italy. In 1958, he earned another gold medal at the Painters of Tuscany Exhibition. His international recognition grew further in 1959 when he won First Prize at the Paris Biennial in France.

In the 1960s, Guiragossian's prominence grew as did his accolades. In 1964, he received the Prize of Fine Arts from the German Association of Arts & Culture. At the Sursock Museum in Beirut, he won the Second Prize for Painting at the VI Spring Salon in 1966 and the First Prize at the museum's competition in 1968. His achievements in Lebanon also included winning the First Prize of "Phillips" in Beirut in 1969 and being honored with the Said Akl Award in 1970.

Guiragossian's contributions to the arts were further celebrated internationally in the 1980s. In 1984, he was named Chevalier de l'Ordre des Arts et des Lettres by the French Ministry of Culture in Paris. A year later, in 1985, he was awarded the Mardiros Sarian Award of the Plastic Arts in Yerevan, Armenia. In 1986, he was knighted twice, first by Pope John Paul II as Chevalier de l'Ordre of St. Silvestre in the Vatican, and then as Chevalier de l'Ordre of St. Mesrob Mashtots in Antelias, Lebanon.

In 1993, Guiragossian received one of Lebanon's highest national honors, the Medal of the National Order of the Cedar.
