= Seta Manoukian =

Lebanese-Armenian painter and Buddhist nun (born 1945)

- Born: Seta Manoukian; 1945 (age 80–81); Beirut, Lebanon
- Education: Accademia di Belle Arti di Roma
- Occupations: Painter; Buddhist nun
- Years active: c. 1967–present
- Known for: Painting, installation, performance art
- Notable work: Lebanese Children and the War (1977); Tache rouge et bleue (1982); Painting in Levitation (2018)
- Movement: Modern Lebanese art
Venerable Ani Pema Tsultrim Drolma
Religious life
- Religion: Buddhism
- School: Theravāda; later Nyingma
- Monastic name: Mother Sela; Ani Pema Tsultrim Drolma
- Ordination: 2005, Sri Lanka
Senior posting
- Teacher: Pemasiri Hamuduruwo; Lama Chodak Gyatso Nubpa Rinpoche
- Based in: Los Angeles, United States

Seta Manoukian (born 1945) is a Lebanese painter of Armenian descent and a Buddhist nun. She is regarded as part of a generation of modern Lebanese artists whose work reflects the cultural and political transformations of the late 20th century. Her artistic practice has evolved from explorations of psychological space and war-related fragmentation to later engagement with themes of exile, spirituality, and Buddhist philosophy.

== Early life and education ==
Manoukian was born in Beirut into an Armenian family. She studied under the Lebanese-Armenian painter Paul Guiragossian between 1960 and 1962.

At the age of seventeen, she won first prize in an art competition and received a scholarship to Perugia, Italy. She later graduated from the Accademia di Belle Arti di Roma in 1966.

== Career ==
After returning to Lebanon in 1967, Manoukian held her first solo exhibition and became associated with the Beirut art scene. Her early work focused on interior spaces, abstraction, and psychological tension.

During the Lebanese Civil War (1975–1990), she taught at the Lebanese University and worked with children in disadvantaged neighbourhoods, incorporating their experiences into artistic and educational projects. Her work from this period reflects fragmentation, instability, and the impact of war on urban and psychological environments.

In 1985, she relocated to Los Angeles, where she continued her artistic practice and exhibited internationally.

== Artistic development ==
Manoukian's work is often discussed in terms of distinct phases:

- Early period (1960s–1970s): Exploration of interiority, stillness, and psychological space.
- Civil war period (1975–1985): Depictions of fragmentation, violence, and urban collapse.
- Exile period (1985–2000): Engagement with displacement and identity, including the “T-shapes” series featuring suspended figures.
- Buddhist phase (2000–present): Emphasis on spiritual themes such as impermanence, emptiness, and consciousness.

== Style and themes ==
Manoukian works across painting, installation, and performance art. Her practice combines figurative and abstract elements, often employing symbolic imagery such as fragmented bodies, empty spaces, and recurring motifs related to survival and transformation.

Following her engagement with Buddhist practice, her work shifted toward contemplative concerns, reflecting themes of balance, inner awareness, and the nature of consciousness.

== Buddhist life ==
In 2000, Manoukian became associated with a Theravāda Buddhist community in Los Angeles. In 2005, she was ordained as a Buddhist nun in Sri Lanka and received the name Mother Sela.

She later engaged with the Nyingma tradition of Tibetan Buddhism and was given the name Ani Pema Tsultrim Drolma.

After nearly a decade focused on Buddhist practice, she resumed painting in 2016.

== Exhibitions ==
Selected exhibitions include:

- 1967 – Galerie Alecco Saab, Beirut
- 1995 – Sherry Frumkin Gallery, Santa Monica
- 2009 – Beirut Art Center
- 2019 – Nabu Museum
- 2024 – Dew Drops, Marfa’, Beirut

== Publications ==
- Lebanese Children and the War (1977)
- Tache rouge et bleue (1982)
- Painting in Levitation (2018)

== Collections ==
Her works are held in major public and private collections, including the Sursock Museum in Beirut, the Saradar Collection, the Barjeel Art Foundation, the National Gallery of Armenia in Yerevan, and institutions in Venice and Vienna. The British Library holds a copy of her Lebanese children and the war (1977).

== Reception and legacy ==
Manoukian's work has been discussed in relation to modern Lebanese art, diaspora identity, and the intersection of art and spirituality. Critics have noted her ability to integrate political, personal, and contemplative themes across different phases of her career.

Her later work, influenced by Buddhist philosophy, has been described as a distinctive contribution to contemporary art, reflecting a shift from socio-political engagement to introspective inquiry.
