= Mona Saudi =

Jordanian sculptor (1945–2022)

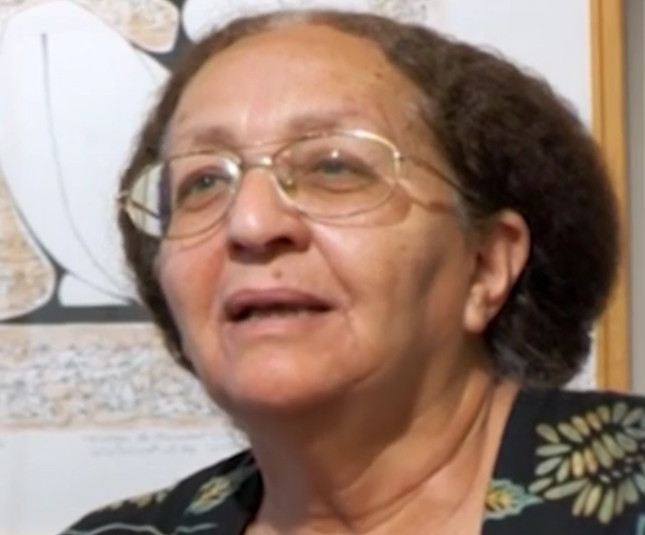
- Saudi in 2013
- Born: 1 October 1945; Amman, Transjordan
- Died: 16 February 2022 (aged 76)
- Education: École nationale supérieure des Beaux-Arts, Paris (1973)
- Known for: Sculptor, publisher, activist
- Movement: Modernist
- Spouse: Hasan Batal (m. 1978)
- Children: 1

Mona Saudi (Arabic: منى السعودي) (1 October 1945 – 16 February 2022) was a Jordanian sculptor, publisher, and art activist.

== Life and career ==
Mona Saudi was born in Amman, Jordan. Her mother was Syrian, while her paternal family had roots in Hejaz. Saudi grew up in a neighbourhood that was metres away from the Nymphaeum (ancient Roman public baths). The proximity to a historic site gave her a profound respect for Jordan's ancient art heritage, as well as providing her with a source of inspiration for her sculptures.

Saudi attended Zain Al-Ashraf School. As a teenager, growing up in Amman, she knew that she wanted to move to Beirut, the then centre of the Arab arts scene, and become a full time artist. At the age of 17 years, she ran away from home, taking a taxi to Beirut. In an interview with the Gulf News, she explained that she left home without her father's permission because in her family, women were banned from attending university.

In Beirut, she met influential artists, poets and intellectuals, including Adonis, Paul Guiragossian and Michel Basbous, and became part of their social circle. She held her first exhibition in a Beirut cafe, and from this raised sufficient funds to purchase a ticket to Paris.

She enrolled at the École nationale supérieure des Beaux-Arts in Paris, and graduated in 1973. In Paris, she began using stone as a medium for her sculpture and had been using it ever since.

Saudi married Palestinian journalist Hasan (or Hassan) Batal in 1976. Their daughter Dia Batal (1978–2023) was a London-based visual artist.

Saudi died on 16 February 2022, at the age of 76.

== Work ==
Saudi mainly sculpts in stone. She used stones from around the world to create her sculptures. Outside of her country, Saudi was one of the best known Jordanian artists. Her subject matter explored themes of growth and creation.

=== Select list of sculptures ===
- Mother / Earth, 1965
- In Time of War: Children Testify, 1970
- Growth, Jordanian jade, c. 2002
- The Seed, 2007

=== Selected solo exhibitions ===
- Poetry and Form, Sharjah Art Museum, 2018
- Poetry in Stone, UAE, 2015
- Al-Balkaa Art Gallery, Fuheis, Jordan, 1992
- Gallery 50 x 70, Beirut, Lebanon, 1992
- Al-Salmieh Gallery, Kuwait City, Kuwait, 1985
- Alia Art Gallery, Amman, Jordan, 1983
- Galerie Épreuve d'Artiste, Beirut, 1982
- Galerie Elissar, Beirut, 1981
- Galerie Contemporain, Beirut, 1975
- Gallery One, Beirut, 1973
- Galerie Vercamer, Paris, 1971

=== Selected group exhibitions ===
- Forces of Change: Artists of the Arab World, 1994
- The National Museum of Women in the Arts, Washington, DC, 1994
- Atelier Art Public, Paris, 1993
- Jordanian Contemporary Art Ontario, Canada, 1991
- Arab Contemporary Art, Paris, 1987
- Arab Contemporary Art, London, 1983

== See also ==
- Jordanian art

== Bibliography ==
- Teller, Matthew (2002). Jordan. Rough Guides. p. 425. ISBN 978-1-85828-740-9.
