= César Gemayel =

Lebanese painter

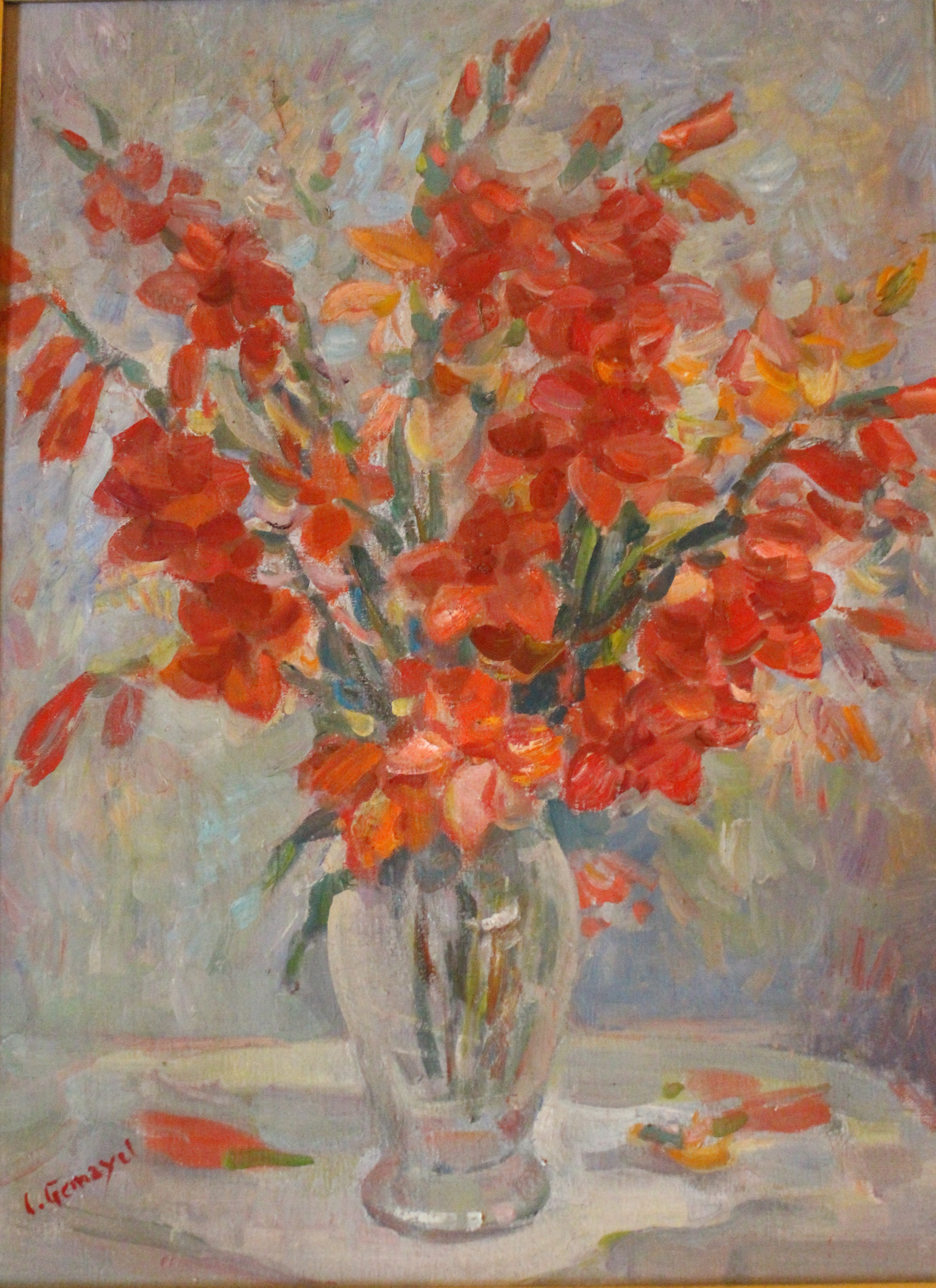
- Still-Life by César Gemayel
- Born: 1898; Ain al Touffaha near Bikfaya, Lebanon
- Died: 1958 (aged 59–60); Beirut, Lebanon
- Education: Khalil Saleeby in Beirut
- Known for: Painter; co-founder of the Lebanese Academy of Fine Arts
- Movement: Modern art

César Gemayel (1898 in Ain al Touffaha near Bikfaya, Ottoman Empire – 1958 in Beirut, Lebanon) was a notable Lebanese painter, who helped to lay the foundations of a modern Lebanese art movement.

== Life and career ==
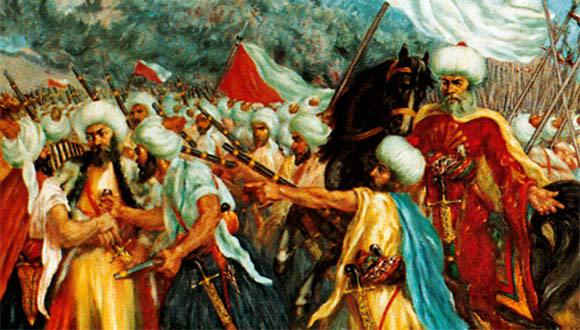
Fakhreddine, by César Gemayel

Gemayel received his early art education from Khalil Saleeby in Beirut.

Gemayel was a pre-eminently sensual artist. His themes - the female nude, glowing flowers, landscapes green and red, dances and "dabkés", the occasional epic evocation - are the product of his thirst for living expressed through painting.

Along with artists, Mustafa Farrukh (1901-1957), Omar Onsi (1901-1969), Saliba Douaihy (Saliba Duwaihi) (b. 1915), Youssef Howayek, Daoud Corm (1852-1930), and Rachid Wehbi (Rachid Wahbah)(b. 1917), Gemayel is regarded as a pioneer, having laid the foundations for a modern art movement in Lebanon. These artists established originality and freedom of expression that had never before been seen in Lebanon.

In 1943, Gemayel and Alexis Boutros founded the Lebanese Academy of Fine Arts (French: L'Académie libanaise des Beaux-Arts), also known as ALBA.

The artist is portrayed on a Lebanese airmail stamp issued in 1974 in recognition of his contribution to the visual arts.
