= Moustafa Farroukh =

Lebanese artist (1901–1957)

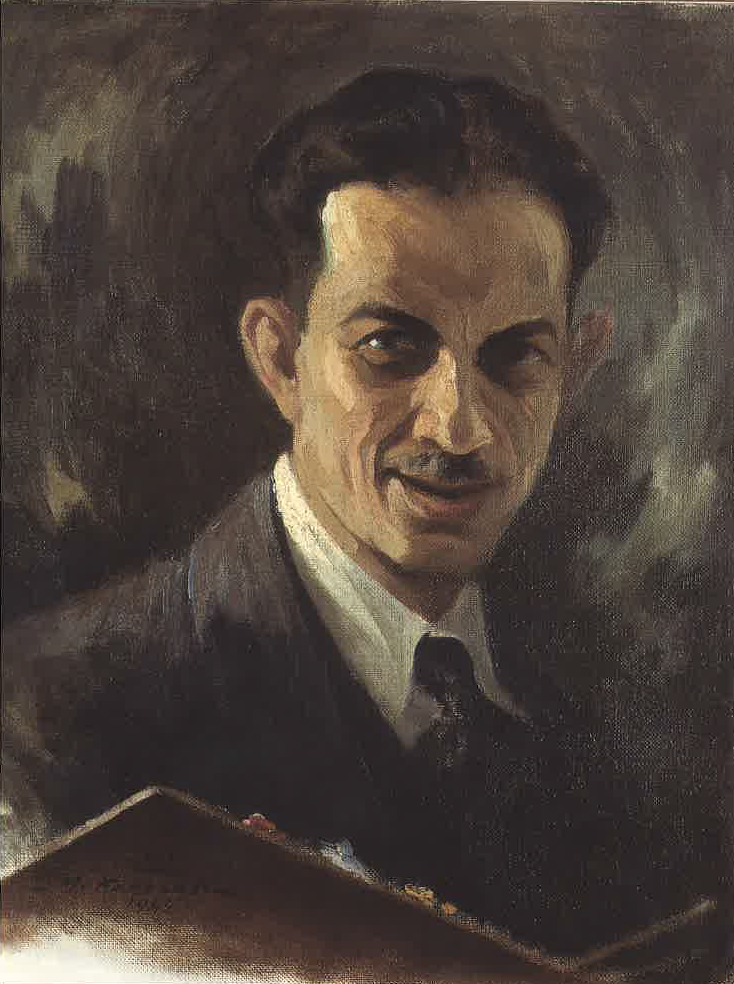
Autoportrait with the Palette, oil on canvas circa 1949

Kab Elias, oil on canvas

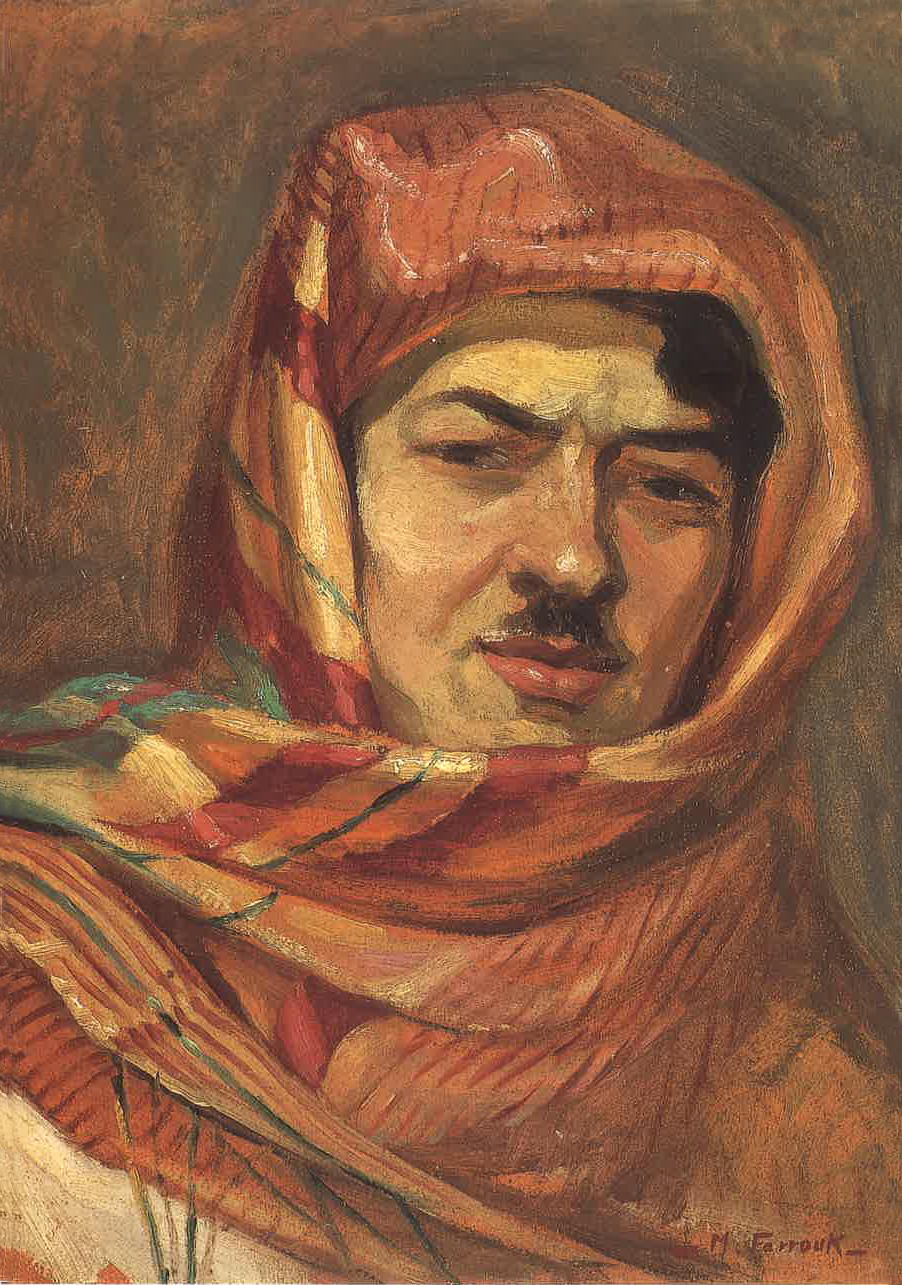
Autoportrait with a Keffiyeh, oil on plywood circa 1938

Moustafa Farroukh (Arabic: مصطفى فروخ; 1901 – 1957) was one of Lebanon's most prominent painters of the 20th century. During his famed career, Farroukh produced over 2,000 paintings, most of which were acquired by collectors both in Lebanon and abroad. He also wrote five books including a biography.

== Career ==
He was formally trained in Rome and graduated in 1927 from Rome's Royal College of Fine Arts. He proceeded to Paris and continued further studies under the guidance of Paul Émile Chabas, the president of the Society of French Artists and many other French artists.

Over his prosperous career, he exhibited in venues from Paris, Venice, New York City and Beirut. In his Studio in Beirut, he established a permanent exhibition of his artwork in 1932.

His work was applauded for its representation of real life in Lebanon in pictures of the country, its people and its customs. He travelled through Spain in the early 1930s where his appreciation of Arabic art and architecture had a long-lasting effect on his artistic touch. He produced several paintings representing the Arab legacy in Spain.

Farroukh gained significant acclaim as a Lebanese national painter during a period when Lebanon was asserting its political independence. His art captured the spirit and character of the Lebanese people, earning him recognition as the preeminent Lebanese painter of his generation. Most of his paintings were portraits, landmarks, or scenery from his homeland Lebanon. Along with artists, Omar Onsi (1901–1969), César Gemayel (Qaisarr Jumayil) (1898–1958), Saliba Douaihy (Saliba Duwaihi) (born 1915) and Rachid Wehbi (Rachid Wahbah) (born 1917), Farroukh is regarded as a pioneer, having laid the foundations for a modern arts movement in Lebanon. These artists established an originality and freedom of expression that had never before been seen in Lebanon. In 1950, as a tribute to his work, Farroukh's name was chosen for listing in Benezit, the world's renowned collection for bibliographical art reference.

Farroukh also wrote five books and taught art at the American University of Beirut and lectured in various academies. He joined the group of philosophers, thinkers, and men and women of literature who lectured in the renowned "Al Nadwa" gatherings or "Le Cénacle Libanais".

In 1974, he was portrayed on a Lebanese airmail postage stamp in recognition of his work.

== Selected exhibitions ==
=== Group exhibitions ===
- The Modernist Colleagues | Farroukh & Onsi, Beirut, Artscoops, 2023-2024
- Art from Lebanon, Beirut Exhibition Center, 2012
- De Lumière et de Sang, Foundation Audi, Beirut, 2010

== Distinctions ==
- Order of Merit (Lebanon) 1954
- National Order of the Cedar
