= Mohammad Rawas =

Lebanese painter and printmaker

Mohammad Rawas or Mohammad El Rawas (born 1951 in Beirut, Lebanon) is a Lebanese painter and printmaker. He studied arts at the Lebanese University, then moved to London and studied Printmaking at the Slade School of Fine Art. He currently lives and works in Beirut, where he taught at the Lebanese University and the American University of Beirut.

== Life and work ==
Rawas began his artistic career with the outbreak of the Lebanese Civil War. He left the country to Damascus, then to Morocco before returning to Lebanon and leaving again to pursue his studies in London. During the late 1970s and early 1980s he produced a body of prints related to the war and to violence in general. These works were presented at several exhibitions, including The Road to Peace, curated by Saleh Barakat at the Beirut Art Center.

From the 1980s and 1990s, Rawas developed a painting practice based on constructions with balsa wood, aluminum and string meticulously built up over portions of canvas. His complex artworks widely use reference to popular culture (manga, comics) and old master paintings such as Las Meninas by Diego Velázquez. In 2013, El Rawas abandons painting to work on creating a series of three-dimensional constructions using multiple materials and techniques. In his latest artistic phase, he goes back to two-dimensional paintings.

For the 2007 Alexandria Biennale, Rawas produced his first installation: Sit Down, Please. The artwork is a multimedia device inspired by a quote from 8th century poet Abu Nuwas related to love and desire within Arab societies.

Magical Realism is what best describes El Rawas' complex constructions. Each one of his compositions is a layered assemblage of objects and techniques, ideas and references. He borrows, modifies, alters, copies, pastes, reinterprets and decontextualizes objects and concepts he finds in the history of art from Italian renaissance to contemporary art, through haute couture and fashion, comics, architecture and photography.

== Auctions ==
In October 2008, a painting from 1974, Souk El-Franj, Bab Idriss (Beirut Vegetable Market), was presented with a $40,000 - $60,000 estimate and hammered for $56,250. The mixed media work One Flew Over The Cuckoo's Nest was proposed in April 2011 for $25,000 - $30,000 and sold for $42,500. Later that year, A La Recherche Du Temps Perdu realized $25,000 with a $25,000 - $35,000 estimate.

== Awards ==
- Prize of the 24th Alexandria Biennale of the Mediterranean Countries. Alexandria, Egypt.
- Honorable Mention at the Ninth Norwegian International Print Triennale, Fredrikstad, Norway, 1989
- Prize of Honor, Cabo Frio International Print Biennale, Brazil, 1985
- Third Prize at The First Contemporary Arab Art Exhibition, Centre d'Art Vivant de la Ville de Tunis, Tunisia, 1984
- Honorable Mention, Third World Biennale of Graphic Art, Iraqi Cultural Center, London, 1980

== Publications ==
- Maker of Realities (with Antoine Boulad, 2011)
- The Art of Rawas, (Saqi Books, 2004)
- M. El Rawas (Antoine Boulad, Platform Gallery, 1991)

== Exhibitions ==
=== Solo exhibitions ===
- Saleh Barakat Gallery, Beirut, 2019
- Agial Art Gallery, Beirut, 2016
- Art Sawa Gallery, Dubai, 2010
- Aida Cherfan Fine Art, Beirut, 2007
- Janine Rubeiz Gallery, Beirut, 2004
- Janine Rubeiz Gallery, Beirut, 2000
- Janine Rubeiz Gallery, Beirut, 1997
- Janine Rubeiz Gallery, Beirut, 1995
- Platform Gallery, Beirut, 1991
- Kufa Gallery, London, 1990
- Rencontre Art Gallery, Beirut, 1979

=== Group exhibitions ===
- Art from Lebanon, Beirut Exhibition Center, 2012
- Q Calling the Shots, vol 3. The Digital Age, Q Contemporary, Beirut, 2011
- Rebirth, Lebanon 21st Century Contemporary Art, Beirut Exhibition Art Center, Beirut, 2011
- Convergence, New Art from Lebanon, The American University Museum, Katzen Arts Center, Washington DC, 2010
- The Road to Peace, Painting in times of war. 1975-1991 Beirut Art Center, Beirut, 2009
- Virtuellement réel: Reflection, in contemporary painting and photography. Alice Mogabgab Gallery, Beirut, 2009
- The Responsive Hand, Drawings 1, Maqam Gallery, Beirut, 2009
- 24th Alexandria Biennale of the Mediterranean Countries. Alexandria, 2007
- Word into Art, Artists of the Modern Middle East. The British Museum, London, 2006
- First Beijing International Art Biennale, 2003
- Tokyo Mini Print Biennale, 2002
- Ninth International Graphic Artists, Trondheim Art Center, Trondheim, 1998
- Eighth Asian Art Biennale, Dacca, 1997
- Kraków International Print Triennale, 1997
- Contemporary Lebanese Artists, Sharjah Art Museum, 1996
- Eighteenth Alexandria Biennale, 1993
- First International Print Biennale, Maastricht, 1993
- Liban, Le Regard des Peintres, Institut du Monde Arabe, Paris, 1989
- Lebanon, The Artist's View, Concourse Gallery, Barbican Center, 1989
- Ninth Norwegian International Print Triennale, Fredrikstad, Norway, 1989
- Presence de la Gravure, Centre d'Art Vivant de la Ville de Tunis, 1988
- Contemporary Lebanese Artists, Kufa Gallery, London, 1988
- Contemporary Arab Art, The Mall Galleries, London, 1986
- Cabo Frio International Print Biennale, Brazil, 1985
- Slade Folio Show, Greenwich Theatre Art Gallery, London, 1981
