= Nayla Tamraz =

Lebanese writer, art critic, curator and researcher

Nayla Tamraz is a Lebanese writer, art critic, curator, researcher and professor of Literature and Art History at Saint Joseph University of Beirut. She obtained her PhD in Comparative Literature (Literature and Art) from the New Sorbonne University (Paris III) in 2004.

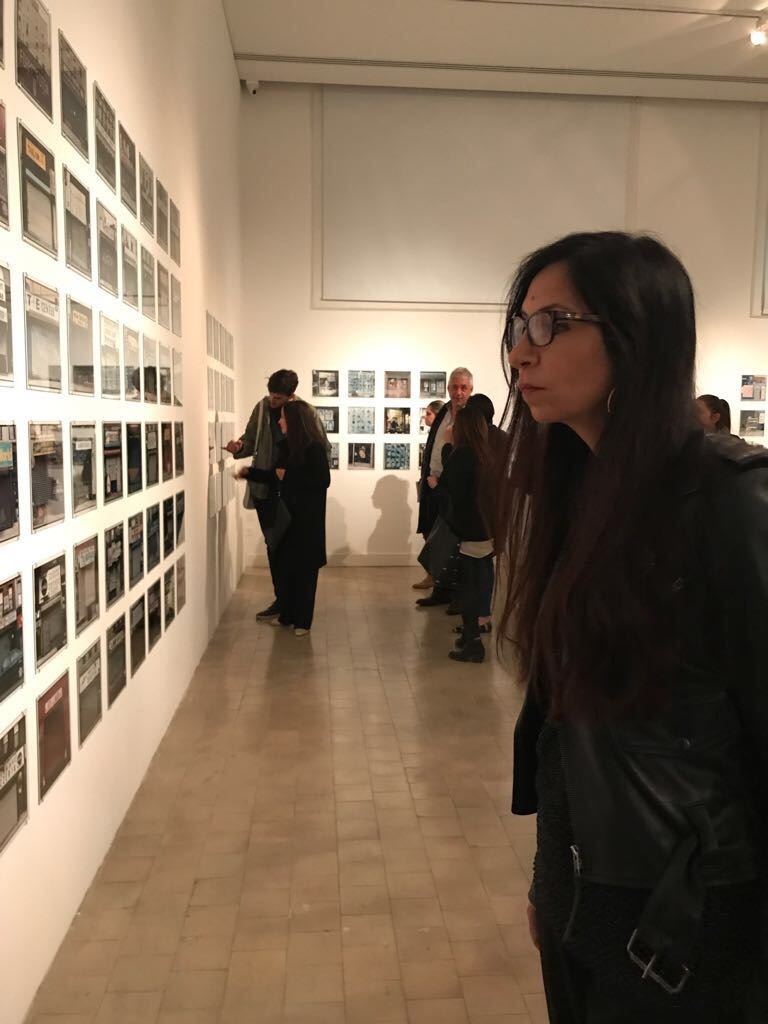
Nayla Tamraz

== Professional path ==
Along with teaching Literature and Art History, Nayla Tamraz has also been, from 2008 to 2017, the Chair of the French Literature Department at Saint Joseph University of Beirut. In 2010, she designed, proposed and launched the MA and PhD program in Art Criticism and Curatorial Studies that she heads. Nayla Tamraz has also designed, organized, curated and co-curated several cultural events including the symposium "Littérature, Art et Monde Contemporain: Récits, Histoire, Mémoire" (2014, Beirut) and the exhibition "Poetics, Politics, Places" that took place in Tucumán, Argentina, from September to December 2017, in the frame of the International Biennale of Contemporary Art of South America (BienalSur).

== Research field ==
Nayla Tamraz' current research explores the issues related to the comparative theory and aesthetics of literature and art, which brings her to the topics of history, memory and narratives in literature and art in post-war Lebanon. Since 2014, she's been developing a multi-disciplinary seminar and research platform on the paradigm of modernity. Her research leads her to question the relationship between poetics and politics as well as the representations associated with the notion of territory.

== Publications ==
=== Books ===
- Proust Portrait Peinture, Paris, Orizons, 2010
- Littérature, art et monde contemporain: récits, histoire, mémoire, Beirut, Presses de l'USJ, 2015

=== Co-edited issue ===
Co-editor, with Claire Launchbury, special issue of the Contemporary French and Francophone studies entitled War, Memory, Amnesia: Postwar Lebanon, Routledge, volume 18, issue No. 5, 2014

=== Book Chapters ===
"Saying the War in Contemporary Lebanese Literary and Artistic Practices: a Few Examples" in Cultural Memory of the Lebanese Civil War—Revisited, (Series: Mobilizing Memories), Volume 04, Chapter 8, Brill, 2025, p. 163–188

=== Collective works ===
- "Dreaming History", in Essays and Stories on Photography in Lebanon, Beyrouth : Kaph publisher, 2018, pp. 297–299.
- "Le topos de la ruine chez Ayman Baalbaki" in Ayman Baalbaki face au KO, Paris : Norma Edition, 2022.
- "Itinéraire dans l’art d’Art d’Ayman Baalbaki » (“A journey in the art of Ayman Baalbaki”) in The World in the Image of Man, Le Monde à l’image de l’homme, Catalogue du Pavillon libanais de la 59ème biennale de Venise, Paris : Skira, 2022.
- Anthologie des littératures de langue française, sous la direction de Mzago Dokhtourichvili, Ilia State University Press, Tbilissi 2022, pp. 335–372.
- "Journal des temps de l’après" in Plastik, revue de l’Institut Acte, unité de recherche de l’Université Paris 1 - Panthéon-Sorbonne, 2024.

=== Academic articles and Texts ===
- "Le poème de Jad Hatem ou une poétique de la révélation" in Acanthe, French literature publications, Saint Joseph University, volume 19, 2001, pp. 73–79.
- "Le patriarche di Grado exorcisant un possédé dans Albertine disparue" in Acanthe, French literature publications, Saint Joseph University, volume 20, 2002, pp. 19–32
- "Transgression et littérature" in Acanthe, French literature publications, Saint Joseph University, volume 21-22, 2003–2004, pp. 337–363
- "Miss Sacripant d'Elstir: leçon d'art, leçon de vie" in Travaux et jours, Saint Joseph University, No. 75, 2005, pp. 171–210
- "Le corps foudroyé dans Figures de la foudre: Méditations poétiques sur trois sculptures de Réthy Tambourji de Jad Hatem" in Plaisance, Rivista quadrimestrale di letteratura francese moderna e contemporanea, Rome, No. 10, 4th year, 2007, pp. 117–130
- "L'image dans le texte: Albertine comme sujet pictural dans À la recherche du temps perdu de Marcel Proust" in Acanthe, French literature publications, Saint Joseph University, volume 24-25, 2006–2007, pp. 133–166
- "La géographie subjective dans quelques romans de Richard Millet" in Travaux et jours, Saint Joseph University, No. 81, 2008–2009, pp. 65–73
- "Pour une poétique de l'interpicturalité" in Acanthe, French literature publications, Saint Joseph University, volume 26-27, 2008–2009, pp. 109–121
- "Sympathie et système de valeurs: pour une réception de La Confession négative de Richard Millet" in Littératures, No. 63, 2011, Presses universitaires du Mirail, pp. 111–124
- "Le roman contemporain libanais et la guerre" in Contemporary French and Francophone Studies/ War, Memory, Amnesia: Postwar Lebanon, Routledge, volume 18, issue No. 5, 2014, pp. 462–469
- "Philippe de Champaigne et Blaise Pascal: dans l'enceinte de Port-Royal" in Acanthe, French literature publications, Saint Joseph University, volume 33, 2015, pp. 101–113
- "Pour une lecture de la ruine: Berytus de Rabee Jaber et Attempt 137 to Map the Drive de Jalal Toufic et Grazielle Rizkallah Toufic" in Littérature, art et monde contemporain: récits, histoire, mémoire, Beirut, Presses de l'USJ, pp. 201–221
- "Georges Schehadé: The Available Landscape" in The Place That Remains: Recounting the Un-built Territory, Lausanne, Skira, 2018, p. 166

=== Texts on art and catalogues ===
- Ayman Baalbaki's Mythological City, Beirut, Alarm Editions, 2009
- "Experiencing the Mountain", Where I End and You Begin: Experiencing the Mountain, photographies by Nadim Asfar, May 2016
- "Money", Sifr, Hady Sy, January 2017
- "On Marginalisation, Activism and Feminism", dialogue with Etel Adnan, Lamia Joreige and Tagreed Darghouth, in Selections, No. 42, September 2017, pp. 48–61
- Poetics, Politics, Places, Catalogue, November 2017
- Mapping the City” in Saradar Collection Art Essays, online publication, May 2020, 15 pages.* "Habiter les interstices", Habiter les interstices : Beyrouth, les artistes et la ville, January 2022
- "Habiter les interstices", Habiter les interstices : Beyrouth, les artistes et la ville, January 2022* “A journey in the art of Ayman Baalbaki” in The World in the Image of Man, Lebanese Pavilion of the 59th Venice Biennale, Skira, 2022
- “Farroukh to Sadek: from excess to presence”, walid sadek paintings 2020-2022, October 2022.
- "Study of a Cloud", "Zena Assi, Study of a Cloud", June 2023.
- "Intermediary Spaces", "Edgard Mazigi, Intermediairy Spaces", October 2023.
- "Journal of Times - Journal of Present Times", catalogue de l’exposition à l’usine Abroyan, Beyrouth, mars 2024.
- "À propos des petits récits", texte de l’exposition « Sur/vie » de Nadim Karam, ESA, mai 2024.
- "When Silent Poetry Settles on the City", texte de l’exposition “Roofs of the City” de Maral Der Boghossian, Kohar Artisan Bookbindery, Juillet 2024.

=== Periodical articles and interviews ===
- "Quand les mots deviennent image: pour une lecture des écrits poétiques de Georgé Chaanine" in Esquisse, Art magazine, No. 3, May 2001, p. 26
- "Alberto Giacometti, une ligne déchirant l'espace" in Esquisse, Art magazine, No. 3, May 2001, pp. 62–65
- "Wael Shawky: la réécriture de l'histoire" in L'Art même, plastic arts chronicle of the French Community of Belgium, No. 51, 2nd quarter of 2011, p. 18
- "Mireille Kassar, AntiNarcissus" in Art Press, No. 431, March 2016, pp. 65–68
- "On Marginalisation, Activism and Feminism", dialogue with Etel Adnan, Lamia Joreige and Tagreed Darghouth, in Selections, No. 42, September 2017, pp. 48–61
- "What is Art", in Selections Art Magazine, 48, mars 2019.
- "Revelations of an extraordinary mind" in Selections Art Magazine, special issue “Being Ayman Baalbaki”, mars 2022, pp. 82–84.
- « Antoine Tabet et ses compagnons : portrait du Liban moderne » in L’Orient littéraire, n. 209, janvier 2024, p. 3.

=== Weekly chronicle ===
- "Sommes-nous modernes ?" in Plurielle/Ici Beyrouth, 22 novembre 2021
- "Lettre à Etel Adnan" in Plurielle/Ici Beyrouth, 24 novembre 2021
- "Crise de la culture ?" in Plurielle/Ici Beyrouth, 10 décembre 2021
- "Le mythe est une parole dépolitisée" in Plurielle/Ici Beyrouth, 19 décembre 2021
- "Du collectif comme résistance à l’Histoire" in Plurielle/Ici Beyrouth, 23 décembre 2021
- "Que puis-je espérer ?" Plurielle/Ici Beyrouth, 30 décembre 2021
- "Rien n’est vrai" in Plurielle/Ici Beyrouth, 7 janvier 2022
- "Une plongée dans La Ronde de nuit (1)" in Plurielle/Ici Beyrouth, 14 janvier 2022
- "Une plongée dans La Ronde de nuit (2)" in Plurielle/Ici Beyrouth, 21 janvier 2022
- "La collection Morosov : portrait de deux collectionneurs" in Plurielle/Ici Beyrouth, 28 janvier 2022
- "Habiter le présent : l’ange de l’Histoire" in Plurielle/Ici Beyrouth, 4 février 2022
- "Délicieux, la république du bien manger" in Plurielle/Ici Beyrouth, 11 février 2022
- "Antoine Compagnon : que reste-t-il de la culture française ?" in Plurielle/Ici Beyrouth, 18 février 2022
- "Quelques propos sur les histoires qu’on raconte… ou pas" in Plurielle/Ici Beyrouth, 25 février 2022]
- "Vers le métavers" in Plurielle/Ici Beyrouth, 4 mars 2022
- "Le dialogue avec la forêt : Galleria d’Eva Jospin" in Plurielle/Ici Beyrouth, 11 mars 2022
- "La ruine de sa demeure" in Plurielle/Ici Beyrouth, 18 mars 2022
- "Beirut and the Golden Sixties: A Manifesto of Fragility” in Plurielle/Ici Beyrouth, 25 mars 2022
- "Galleria Continua : l’Odyssée de l’art contemporain" in Plurielle/Ici Beyrouth, 1er avril 2022
- "Les passages : des espaces autres" in Plurielle/Ici Beyrouth, 8 avril 2022
- "Villes invisibles et utopies urbaines" in Plurielle/Ici Beyrouth, 15 avril 2022]
- "Chez Ely Dagher on ne voit plus la mer" in Plurielle/Ici Beyrouth, 22 avril 2022
- "Sebastiao Salgado : l’eau, les paysages et les hommes" in Plurielle/Ici Beyrouth, 29 avril 2022
- "Stage of Life : un parcours scénographique, cartographique et personnel" in Plurielle/Ici Beyrouth, 7 mai 2022
- "Utopie, dystopie et vivre-ensemble" in Plurielle/Ici Beyrouth, 13 mai 2022
- "De l’optimisme comme vertu politique" in Plurielle/Ici Beyrouth, 20 mai 2022
- "Festival Bipod : pour une désobéissance culturelle" in Plurielle/Ici Beyrouth, 27 mai 2022
- "The Dam : un barrage sur fond de révolution" in Plurielle/Ici Beyrouth, 28 mai 2022
- "De la transparence comme esthétique chez Azza Abo Rebieh" in Plurielle/Ici Beyrouth, 5 juin 2022
- "De l’amour comme propos mineur" in Plurielle/Ici Beyrouth, 10 juin 2022
- "A propos de l’art contemporain (1)" in Plurielle/Ici Beyrouth, 17 juin 2022
- "A propos de l’art contemporain (2)" in Plurielle/Ici Beyrouth, 24 juin 2022
- "Confiscated imaginaries : représentation et préservation en temps de crise" in Plurielle/Ici Beyrouth, 1er juillet 2022
- "Medusa : mythe, histoire et culture contemporaine (1)" in Plurielle/Ici Beyrouth, 8 juillet 2022
- "Ashkal Alwan : remodeler la relation au public" in Plurielle/Ici Beyrouth, 15 juillet 2022
- "Medusa : mythe, histoire et interprétation (2)" in Plurielle/Ici Beyrouth, 22 juillet 2022
- "Vers la définition d’un groupe : Séraphim, Doche, Barrage" in Plurielle/Ici Beyrouth, 29 juillet 2022
- "Trois femmes photographes : trois regards" in Plurielle/Ici Beyrouth, 5 août 2022
- "La peinture au cœur du propos" in Plurielle/Ici Beyrouth, 12 août 2022
- "Paintings 2020-2022 : Conversation avec Walid Sadek" in Plurielle/Ici Beyrouth, 20 août 2022
- "Terraform : une poétique de la machine et du vivant" in Plurielle/Ici Beyrouth, 28 août 2022
- "L’archivage comme entreprise de traduction collective" in Plurielle/Ici Beyrouth, 3 septembre 2022
- "Rapports sociaux, mariage et société des hommes" in Plurielle/Ici Beyrouth, 9 septembre 2022
- "Instabilité du monde et mondialité (1)" in Plurielle/Ici Beyrouth, 16 septembre 2022
- "Instabilité du monde et mondialité : le musée en devenir (2)" in Plurielle/Ici Beyrouth, 23 septembre 2022
- "Quand la ville nous parle" in Plurielle/Ici Beyrouth, 30 septembre 2022
- "La Rivière : dernier opus du triptyque de Ghassan Salhab" in Plurielle/Ici Beyrouth, 7 octobre 2022
- "Le marché de l’art se porte bien" in Plurielle/Ici Beyrouth, 15 octobre 2022
- "Le chant photographique d’Anne-Lise Broyer" in Plurielle/Ici Beyrouth, 26 octobre 2022
- "Les Goncourt et les Corm : la saga des familles" in Plurielle/Ici Beyrouth, 31 octobre 2022
- "Esthétiques contemporaines et temps d’incertitudes" in Plurielle/Ici Beyrouth, 8 novembre 2022
- "Vingt-deux perspectives sur le contemporain" in Plurielle/Ici Beyrouth, 12 novembre 2022
- "Une mémoire collective de la violence" in Plurielle/Ici Beyrouth, 18 novembre 2022
- "Détourne de moi tes yeux : une esthétique du détournement" in Plurielle/Ici Beyrouth, 25 novembre 2022
- "Le dialogue de l’éternel et du fugace (1/2)" in Plurielle/Ici Beyrouth, 3 décembre 2022
- "L’éternel et le fugace : Time no longer (2/2)" in Plurielle/Ici Beyrouth, 9 décembre 2022
- "Qu’est-ce qu’écrire ? Pourquoi écrire ?" in Plurielle/Ici Beyrouth, 17 décembre 2022
- "Le chant du monde et celui de la littérature" in Plurielle/Ici Beyrouth, 23 décembre 2022
- "Les lost boys de la Génération X" in Plurielle/Ici Beyrouth, 30 décembre 2022
- "Cézanne et l’image cachée" in Plurielle/Ici Beyrouth, 6 janvier 2023
- "Le dialogue des formes et des couleurs" in Plurielle/Ici Beyrouth, 15 janvier 2023
- "De la photographie comme propos" in Plurielle/Ici Beyrouth, 22 janvier 2023
- "Imaginer de nouveaux futurs désirables" in Plurielle/Ici Beyrouth, 27 janvier 2023
- "Les assemblées : rituels politiques et pouvoir de transformation" in Plurielle/Ici Beyrouth, 3 février 2023
- "Le bonheur est dans le jardin" in Plurielle/Ici Beyrouth, 10 février 2023
- "Délaissés urbains et espaces d’indécision" in Plurielle/Ici Beyrouth, 17 février 2023
- "La Révolution surréaliste : le pape mis en vente" in Plurielle/Ici Beyrouth, 25 février 2023
- "IA : ces intelligences qui inquiètent" in Plurielle/Ici Beyrouth, 5 mars 2023
- "Écrire le deuil : Journal de Roland Barthes" in Plurielle/Ici Beyrouth, 12 mars 2023
- "Quand l’art répond à la perte" in Plurielle/Ici Beyrouth, 17 mars 2023
- "Entre fascination et inquiétude : les explorateurs du collapse" in Plurielle/Ici Beyrouth, 25 mars 2023
- "Mort ou vivant, le chat ?" in Plurielle/Ici Beyrouth, 1er avril 2023
- "Que peut encore la littérature ?" in Plurielle/Ici Beyrouth, 7 avril 2023
- "Pour ou contre la culture du bannissement ?", 14 avril 2023
- "For or Against Cancel Culture?” in Plurielle/This is Beirut, May 18, 2023
- "Le chant élémentaire de Hanibal Srouji" in Plurielle/Ici Beyrouth, 21 avril 2023
- "Splendeur et misère de la Chine" in Plurielle/Ici Beyrouth, 28 avril 2023
- "Splendor and Misery of China” in Plurielle/This is Beirut, May 10, 2023
- "The Return de Rayan Tabet : une expérience immersive" in Plurielle/Ici Beyrouth, 6 mai 2023
- "Où tout cela commence et finit ?" in Plurielle/Ici Beyrouth, 12 mai 2023
- "L’extime, ou le silence assourdissant du cri" in Plurielle/Ici Beyrouth, 21 mai 2023
- "Extimacy, or the Deafening Silence of the Scream”, in Plurielle/This is Beirut, May 21, 2023
- "City Lights et la Beat Generation” in Plurielle/Ici Beyrouth, 26 mai 2023
- "City Lights and the Beat generation” in Plurielle/This is Beirut, May 26, 2023
- "Le Studio Huguette Caland à Los Angeles" in Plurielle/Ici Beyrouth, 2 juin 2023
- "Huguette Caland’s Studio in Los Angeles” in Plurielle/This is Beirut, June 2, 2023
- "Ansel Adams dans notre époque" in Plurielle/Ici Beyrouth, 11 juin 2023
- "Ansel Adams in our Time” in Plurielle/This is Beirut, June 11, 2023
- "La ville et son imaginaire chez Zena Assi" in Plurielle/Ici Beyrouth, 16 juin 2023
- "The City and it’s Imaginary in Zena Assi’s Work” in Plurielle/This is Beirut, June 16, 2023
- "Tarek Elkassouf : The Future is Near” in Plurielle/Ici Beyrouth, 23 juin 2023
- "Tarek Elkassouf: The Future is Near” in Plurielle/This is Beirut, June 23, 2023
- "Takeover : un projet pour exister autrement" in Plurielle/Ici Beyrouth, 27 juin 2023
- "Takeover : A Project to Exist Differently” in Plurielle/This is Beirut, June 27, 2023

=== Creative writing ===
- Passantes, Photographs by Alain Brenas, Beirut, Presses de l'Académie libanaise des Beaux-Arts, 2013

== Curatorial practice ==
- Le Secret, Espace Ygreg, Les bons voisins, Paris, France, April 4-April 28, 2017 (Co-curator)

Artists : Donatien Aubert, Ismail Bahri, Béatrice Balcou, Jean-Baptiste Caron, Sarah Charlesworth, Raphaël Dallaporta, Edith Dekyndt, Justine Emard, Nicolas Gourault, Gilbert Hage, Noelle Kahanu, Violaine Lochu, Aurel Porté, Shooshie Sulaiman, Jeanne Susplugas, Francisco Tropa, Melvin Way

- Poetics, Politics, Places, Timoteo Navarro Museum, Tucumán, Argentina, September–December 2017: In the frame of the International Biennale of Contemporary Art of South America (Curator)

Artists: Saliba Douaihy, Etel Adnan, Mireille Kassar, Gilbert Hage, Cynthia Zaven, Nadim Asfar, Danièle Genadry, Saba Innab.

- Habiter les interstices : Beyrouth, les artistes et la ville, Galerie Michel Journiac, Paris, France, January 2022 (co-curator)

Artists: Ali Cherri, Sirine Fattouh, Joana Hadjithomas et Khalil Joreige, Mireille Kassar, Marwan Moujaes, Thomas Van Reghem, Paola Yacoub, Maha Yammine

- "Ways of Vanishing”, Sursock Museum, Beirut, November 2023, in the frame of the contemporary art biennial of South America (BienalSur) (co-curator)

Artists : Marwa Arsanios (LBN), Ecem Arslanay (TUR) and Yigit Tanel Kaçar (ITA/TUR), Louise Botkay (BRA), Ali Cherri (LBN), Özden Demir (TUR), Fouad Elkhoury (LBN), Sirine Fattouh (LBN), Ahmad Ghossein (LBN), Aylin Gökmen (CHE/TUR), Joana Hadjithomas (LBN) and Khalil Joreige (LBN), Ghassan Halwani (LBN), Rafael Hastings (PER), Laura Huertas Millán (COL/FRA), Lamia Joreige (LBN), Mireille K assar (LBN), Florencia Levy (ARG), Los Ingrávidos (MEX), Omar Mismar (LBN), Óscar Muñoz (COL), Dala Nasser (LBN), Nour Ouayda (LBN), Paul Rosero Contre-ras (ECU), Ana Vaz (BRA), Maya Watanabe (PER), Paola Yacoub (LBN) and Michel Lasserre (FRA), Müge YIldiz (TUR), Akram Zaatari (LBN), Cynthia Zaven (LBN).

- "Journal of Times – Journal of Present Times”, Abroyan Factory, Beirut, march 2024 (curator)

Artist : Nadim Karam
