= Aref Rayess =

Lebanese painter and sculptor (1928–2005)

Aref El Rayess
- عارف الريس
- Born: 25 October 1928; Aley, Mount Lebanon
- Died: 27 January 2005 (aged 76)
- Known for: Painting, sculpture
- Notable work: The Road to Peace
- Children: Hala El Rayess

Aref El Rayess (or Aref Rayess) (25 October 1928 – 27 January 2005), was a Lebanese modernist painter and sculptor. His practice also included etching, tapestry and public sculpture.

Largely self-taught, Rayess first exhibited at the American University of Beirut in 1948 and later trained in Paris, including at the Académie de la Grande Chaumière in the studios of Fernand Léger, André Lhote and Ossip Zadkine. His travels and periods of residence in West Africa, Europe, North America and the Gulf influenced a body of work that moved between abstraction, figuration and politically engaged subjects.

== Life ==
Born in Aley, Mount Lebanon, Aref Rayess started his career as a self-taught artist exhibiting for the first time in 1948. He lived in Africa for many years during which he traveled between Senegal and Paris. In Paris, he joined the studios of Fernand Léger, André Lhote, Marcel Marceau and Ossip Zadkine while studying at the Académie de la Grande Chaumière. In 1957, he returned to Lebanon, but left again for Florence in 1959 with a scholarship from the Italian government. From 1960 to 1963, he lived in Rome where he went on studying and exhibiting. In 1963, he returned to Lebanon.

Rayess participated in many group shows including the biennales of São Paulo (1960) and Bagdad (1974); the Unesco exhibition in Montreal (1978); the Mall Galleries, London (1986) and the Salons of the Sursock Museum, Beirut (1961, 1962, 1963, 1965, 1966, 1968). He has held more than fifteen solo shows in Lebanon.

Internationally, his Individual exhibitions include: the Poliani Gallery, Rome (1959); Numero Gallery, Florence (1959); D'Arcy Gallery, New York; Excelsior Gallery, Mexico (1964); the Rodin Museum, Paris (1966); a retrospective of his works, 1957–1968, at the National Museum of Damascus (1969); Ornina Gallery, Damascus (1974), Gallery Rasim, Algeria (1976) and in Venezuela.

He was commissioned by the Lebanese government to design and execute a tapestry presented to the UNESCO centre in Paris. The Lebanese government also requested him to create two sculptures to represent Lebanon at the World Fair in New York.

Aref El Rayess won several awards in Lebanon. These include: the Lebanese Ministry of National Education Award for the 1955 spring exhibition, the Unesco Prize for the Spring Salon of 1957, the Ministry of Public Works First and Second Prize for Sculpture (1963), the Sursock Museum Grand Prix de Sculpture (1965–66) for different works exhibited and their First Prize for Sculpture (1966–67) as well as the Ministry of Tourism First and Second Prizes (1966).

President of the Lebanese Artists Association – Painters and Sculptors, El Rayess taught for many years at the Lebanese University and the American Lebanese University. With the outbreak of the civil war in Lebanon, he relocated to Saudi Arabia and was appointed as the city of Jeddah's art consultant for many years. He had been commissioned by the Saudi Arabian government to produce several sculptures. One of the most outstanding is that of the stylized name of Allah. Designed by him and built in Italy from aluminum, it stands twenty seven meters high in Palestine Square in Jeddah. Among the artist's most recent works is a series of oil paintings capturing the nature and feeling of the Arabian desert.

Rayess died in January 2005.

== Work ==
Aref El Rayess was a prolific artist, mainly known as a painter, he also practiced etching, sculpture and tapestry. One of his tapestries, The Signs of Cadmus, is part of the collection of the UNESCO Palace in Paris.

His work is widely based on the human being and its relationship to nature and history, stating that "Man is a unity that embodies both the means and the goals...".

In the 1960s his painting evolved around Man and the Third World and in the early 1970s, he unexpectedly presented an exhibition related to whorehouses off Martyrs' Square, Beirut.

With the outbreak of the Lebanese Civil War, El Rayess was one of the artists who interpreted the tragic events in art. Staying in Algiers, he produced in 1976 a series of etchings entitled The Road to Peace. This work gave its name to an exhibition Saleh Barakat curated in 2009 at the Beirut Art Center, encompassing Lebanese visual arts between 1975 and 1991. Apart from the etching series, oil paintings depicting the horror of war were featured in the exhibition. In these troubled times, El Rayess showed political involvement in creating a poster commemorating the assassination of the Druze leader Kamal Jumblatt.

Aref El Rayess also developed a practice of abstract sculpture. He was commissioned monumental works for the city of Jeddah, including a piece named "Swords of God (Soyuf Allah)".

== Auctions ==
Paintings by El Rayess have appeared relatively infrequently at auction. In October 2007, Labyrinths of the Millenium was estimated at $30,000–$35,000 and sold for $37,000. One year later, H. T. M. (Human, Time and Machine) was estimated at $60,000–$80,000 and was sold for $62,500.

== Publications ==
Most of the book can be found with his daughter Hala Aref El Rayess, and a few at "RectoVerso" a library dedicated to art in Lebanon.

2012 – http://www.beirutexhibitioncenter.com/exhibitions/art-lebanon ISBN 978-9953-0-2420-2

2004 – "Al Layl Al Tṭawīl Wa'al Kalimah" (The Long Night and The Word) OCLC Number: 64576609

2003 – "Al Ayyām Al Ramādīyah: Alwān, Aḥruf, Suwar" (The Gray Days: Colors, Letters, Pictures) Riad El Rayess Books – ISBN 9953211426 ISBN 9789953211428

2001 – A Dedication to his daughter "Hodourak Fi Ghiyab Al Thol" (Your presence in the absence of the shadow) Publishing house and ISBN not available.

2000 – "Matahat Jamila" (Beautiful Maze) Nawfal Publishing – ISBN not available.

1999 – A Selection of Interviews "Rehlah Dakhel al-Zat" (A journey within my self) Dar AlJadeed Publishing – ISBN not available.

1982 – One Hundred Years of Plastic Arts in Lebanon 1880–1980 Imprimerie Catholique sal, Araya, Lebanon – ISBN not available.

1976 – "Tarik al Salam" (The Road to Peace) Illustration of the 1975 War in Lebanon OCLC Number: 41596994

1972 – A Manifesto by Rayess "Maa' Man, Wa Dud Man" (With Who, and Against Whom) Publishing house and ISBN not available due to its contents.

== Selected exhibitions ==
=== Solo exhibitions ===
- Noir et Blanc – Temps et Homme d'Aref Rayess, Espace SD, Beirut, 2002
- 2001 – Chants du carré – Galerie Janine Rubeiz, Beirut, Lebanon
- 1997 – Gallery World of Art, Beirut, Lebanon
- 1996 – Galerie Janine Rubeiz, Beirut, Lebanon
- 1995 – Centre Culturel Français, Beirut, Lebanon
- 1993 – Hommage au petit prince, French Cultural Center, Beirut
- 1979 – Galerie Epreuve d'Artiste, Beirut, Lebanon
- 1978 – Exposition Caracas, Venezuela
- 1976 – Galerie Racim, Algeria
- 1975 – Gallery Le Point, Beirut, Lebanon
- 1973 – The Flowers of rue Al Moutanabbi, Galerie Contact, Beirut, Lebanon
- 1972 – Gallery One, Beirut, Lebanon
- 1971 – Galerie Manoug, Beirut, Lebanon
- 1969/1970 – Dar El Fan, Beirut, Lebanon
- 1968 – L'Orient le Jour, Beirut, Lebanon
- 1967 – Gallery One, Beirut, Lebanon
- 1965 – Galerie Excelsior, Mexico
- 1964 – D'Arcy Gallery, New York
- 1964 – Galerie La Licorne, Beirut, Lebanon
- 1961/1963 – Galerie La Licorne, Beirut, Lebanon
- 1958/1961 Rome, Florence, Venise – Italy
- 1958 – Galerie Alecco Saab, Beirut, Lebanon
- 1957 – Italian Cultural Center, Beirut, Lebanon
- 1954 – Dakar, Senegal, Africa
- 1948 – American University of Beirut, West Hall, Lebanon

=== Group exhibitions ===
- Art from Lebanon, Beirut Exhibition Center, 2012

=== Collective exhibitions ===
- 1948 – Unesco, Lebanon
- 1955/1957 – Ministry of Education, Lebanon
- 1961/1966 – Sursock Museum, Lebanon
- 1960 – Biennale São Paulo, Brazil
- 1964 – New York World Fair, USA
- 1967 – Biennale Musée Rodin, Paris
- 1968 – International Exposition, New York
- 1974 −1ere Biennale des Artistes Arabes, Baghdad
- 1979 – Ministry of Tourism, Lebanon
- 1980 – Unesco, Lebanon

=== Private collections ===
- Musée du Ministère de L'Education Nationale, Lebanon
- Musée Sursock, Lebanon
- Musée d'Art Contemporain, Irak
- Musée d'Art Contemporain, Syrie
- Musée National, Algérie

=== Awards ===
- 1955 – Prix de l'Education Nationale Salon du Printemps
- 1957 – UNESCO Awards in the Salon du Printemps
- 1963 – Premier et Second prix du Concours de Ministère des travaux Publique pour le Palais de Justice (National 1st & 2nd Prize)
- 1965/1966 – Sursock Museum's awards for Sculpture & Painting in the Salon D'Automne
- 1966 – Premier prix et Deuxième prix du concours de Sculpture du comite d'embellissement de la cite Libanaise
- 1967 – First Prize at the Sursock Museum's Award for Painting in the Salon D'Automne
- 1982 – The Tarua Europe's Award in Rome
- Musée National, Kuwait
- Musée National Jordan
- Musee de Jeddah, Arabie Saoudite
- Musee de Tabouk, Arabie Saoudite
- Old Hundred Museum, New York, USA
- Roosevelt Museum, Philadelphia, USA
- Palais de L'UNESCO, Paris, France
