= Omar Onsi =

Lebanese painter

- Born: Umar al-Unsi; 1901; Tallet Al-Khayat, Beirut, Lebanon, Ottoman Empire
- Died: 3 June 1969 (aged 67–68); Beirut, Lebanon
- Education: Khalil Saleeby in Lebanon; Académie Julian, Paris
- Known for: Painter
- Style: Modern art, Impressionism, Realism

Omar Onsi (1901–1969) (Arabic: عمر أنسي) was a pioneer of modern painting in Lebanon and Lebanon's most renowned impressionist painter. He was born in Tallet Al-Khayat, Beirut in 1901. His father, Dr. Abdul Rahman El Ounsi, was a prominent general practitioner, had been one of the first Beirut Muslims to study modern Western medicine and his mother came from the prominent Sunni Muslim family Salam, who notably dressed in Western attire. He was named after his paternal grandfather, the scholarly poet, Omar, who was well known in Beirut.

After an attempt to study medicine, Onsi studied painting in Beirut with Khalil Saleeby at his atelier across the street from Beirut University.

In around 1922, he travelled to Amman, where he settled for a number of years (1922–1927), and taught painting and English to the children of King Abdullah. His career subsequently benefited from the patronage of the Jordanian King. The discovery of the desert and its colours during this stay in Amman had a major influence on his work. During this time, he also documented the indigenous peoples, both ethnographically and visually.

In 1928, Onsi went to Paris to continue his training and stayed for 3 years, attending the Académie Julian and different workshops. During that period, Onsi focused on painting portraits, nudes, and Parisian scenery. While in Paris, he met the painter, Georges Cyr and the sculptor, Youssef El-Houwayek, with whom he became a lifelong friend. He also met his first wife, Ema, in Paris.

In 1930, following the untimely death of his first wife, he travelled to As-Suwayda in Syria for a period of mourning. In 1933, he returned to Lebanon, bringing back a colorful impressionist palette and a French second wife. From then on, his work focused on the Lebanese landscape. A Lebanese woman, known simply as Grandma Kamal, visited Onsi at his Tallet Al-Khayat property in the late 1930s, and recalled that there were many gazelles roaming about. Gazelles featured prominently in his paintings.

He held his first solo exhibition at the School of Arts and Crafts in Beirut in 1932. At that time, the market for Western-influenced art was emerging as the educated middle-classes and elites began to purchase works by local artists. From the outset, Onsi charged relatively high prices for his paintings - 5,000 francs for an allegory, 1,000 for a portrait and around 200 francs for a landscape. However, the landscapes were more popular with the Lebanese elites, and Onsi soon began producing landscapes in much greater numbers and began charging higher prices for them. Before long, he was receiving an average price of 500 francs for a landscape. The local press quickly touted him as a skilled paysagiste, a title that soon launched his career.

Onsi continued to travel throughout he 1940s and 50s, and exhibited his work in Germany, Spain, Italy, and Egypt. He died on 3 June 1969 in Beirut, after suffering from stomach cancer.

Along with artists, Mustafa Farrukh (1901–1957), César Gemayel (Qaisarr Jumayil) (1898–1958), Saliba Douaihy (Saliba Duwaihi) (born 1915) and Rachid Wehbi (Rachid Wahbah) (born 1917), Osni is regarded as a pioneer, having laid the foundations for a modern arts movement in Lebanon. These artists established an originality and freedom of expression that had never before been seen in Lebanon.

After his death, he became one of Lebanon's best-known artists.

== Work ==
Osni focussed on natural views (al-manazir al tabi'iyya) in which he strove to remove "traces of himself as a rationalizing being and to react unselfconsciously with sure draughtsmanship, direct brushwork, and heightened sensitivity to optical effects." He spent hours engaged in observation before rendering a graphic version of a subject. His painting, The Solitary House, is said to be the finest example of his style. He worked in pencil, watercolour, oil and occasionally in clay and bronze, although few of his figurines are extant.

=== Solo exhibitions ===
- Omar Onsi Retrospective, Sursock Museum, Beirut, 1997

=== Group exhibitions ===
- Art from Lebanon, Beirut Exhibition Center, 2012

Select list of paintings

- Bedouin, 1926, watercolor, 43 x 33 cm 1926
- Beirut (pre-1930), bef. 1930, oil on canvas, 50 x 65 cm
- A Passage to Lebanon, 1931, oil on Panel, 40.5 X 32.5 cm
- Beirut Landscape, gouache on Ppper
- Beirut Suburbs, date unknown, oil on board, 36 x 52 cm
- View of Hauran, 1935, oil on canvas
- Nabeh el Safa, 1936, watercolor, 35 x 50 cm, Joseph and Aline Faloughi collection, Beirut
- Fountain, 1936, oil on wood, 38 x 46 cm Agial Art Gallery, Beirut
- The Solitary House
- Village in Lebanon, 1937
- Old Pine, 1940 Watercolor, 56 x 44 cm Joseph and Aline Faloughi collection, Beirut
- Mountain Landscape, 1938, oil on canvas, 65 x 75 cm Joseph and Aline Faloughi collection, Beirut
- Dabkeh, date unknown, 200 x 556 cm, Military School, Fayadiyeh
- Orange Grove in Sidon, date unknown, oil, 39.5 x 31.5 cm, Collection of Mrs Haya Onsi Tabbara
- Path to the Artist's Home, date unknown, oil, 59 x 71 cm, Collection Mrs. Bouchra Onsi
- House on Rocks at Ain El Tannour, Meyrouba, date unknown, watercolor, 39 x 30 cm, Collection Mr. Tammam Salam
- The Tattooing, date unknown, watercolor, 33 x 43 cm, Collection Mr Mansour Onsi
- Camels at the Drinking Trough, date unknown, Oil, 80 x 99 cm, Collection Dr. Hassan Rifai
- Two Gazelles, date unknown, watercolor, 33 x 48 cm, Collection Mr Samir Abillamah
- Kurd Women in Beirut, date unknown, pastel, 48 x 63 cm, Collection Dr, Hassan Rifai
- Mule in Front of an "Irzal", date unknown, watercolor, 34 x 47 cm, Collection Mr. Jihad Abillamah
- Olive-Picking, date unknown, watercolor, 34 x 49 cm, collection Mr. Farouk Abillamah
- Tallet El Khayat, date unknown, oil on canvas
- The Oak of the village of Aramoun, watercolor, 37.5 x 57 cm
- The Village of Mayrouba, watercolor, 39 x 57 cm, date unknown
- The Village of Baabda, watercolor, 34 x 52 cm
- Wadia Sabra sitting on a chair, oil, 1950. Now reportedly missing ! It was most probably stolen when the Palestinians invaded and destroyed the Conservatoire during the Civil War in 1975.

== Awards and honors ==
- 1947 Lebanese National Order of the Cedars, Knights Rank
- 1956 Lebanese National Order of the Cedars, Merit Award
- 1963 Lebanese Philanthropic Merit Award
- 1964 Lebanese Ministry of Education Medallion
- 1968 Said Akl Prize
- 2004 Public sculpture installed in his honor in the park of the Serail, (Lebanese Government offices), Beirut, Lebanon
