= Alfred Basbous =

Lebanese modernist artist and sculptor

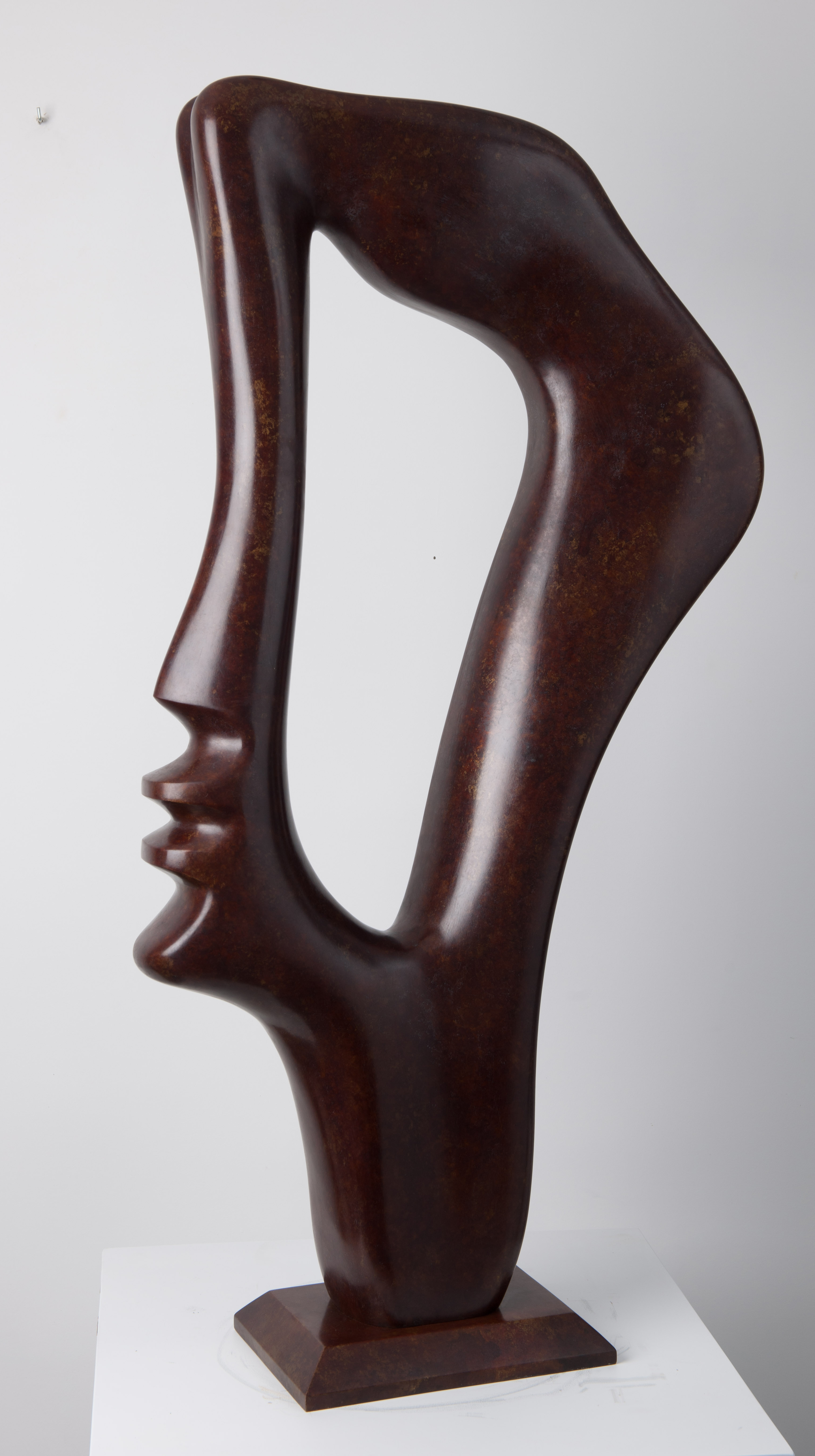
Profile by Alfred Basbous (2004)

Alfred Basbous (28 December 1924 – 1 January 2006) was a Lebanese modernist artist and sculptor.

His works are often abstract or figurative variations on the female body, notable for their fluidity of form.

Drawing from a diverse range of sources, including works by Henry Moore, Jean Arp, and Constantin Brâncuși, Basbous worked with marble, bronze, and stone to express what he saw as the simple essence of the human form, divesting it any embellishments he considered frivolous or meaningless. His works also display the influence of Phoenician culture, Lebanese folk art, and Christian Maronite Church iconography.

== Biography ==
Basbous was born in the village of Rachana, Lebanon, the son of a Christian cleric. After a period working as a mason for a railroad company, he began carving sculptures depicting birds, reptiles, and the female nude, which was to become a recurring theme of his work.

Basbous gave his first exhibition in 1958 at the Alecco Saab Gallery in Beirut. By 1960, aided by a scholarship from the French government, he was studying under the sculptor René Collmarini at L’Ecole Nationale des Beaux-Artes de Paris. The following year works by Basbous were exhibited in the International Sculpture Exhibition at the Musée Rodin in Paris.

Basbous visited Henry Moore’s studio in 1972, a year in which modernist public sculptures were unveiled all over Britain. Impressed by the British government’s support for the arts, he prevailed upon his own government to follow Britain’s example, taking the initiative himself by establishing his birthplace Rachana as an open-air sculpture park. From 1994 to 2004 he hosted the International Symposium of Sculpture at Rachana, where sculptors from all over the world were invited to work and exhibit. The park is today a UNESCO site.
