= Michel Basbous =

Lebanese sculptor

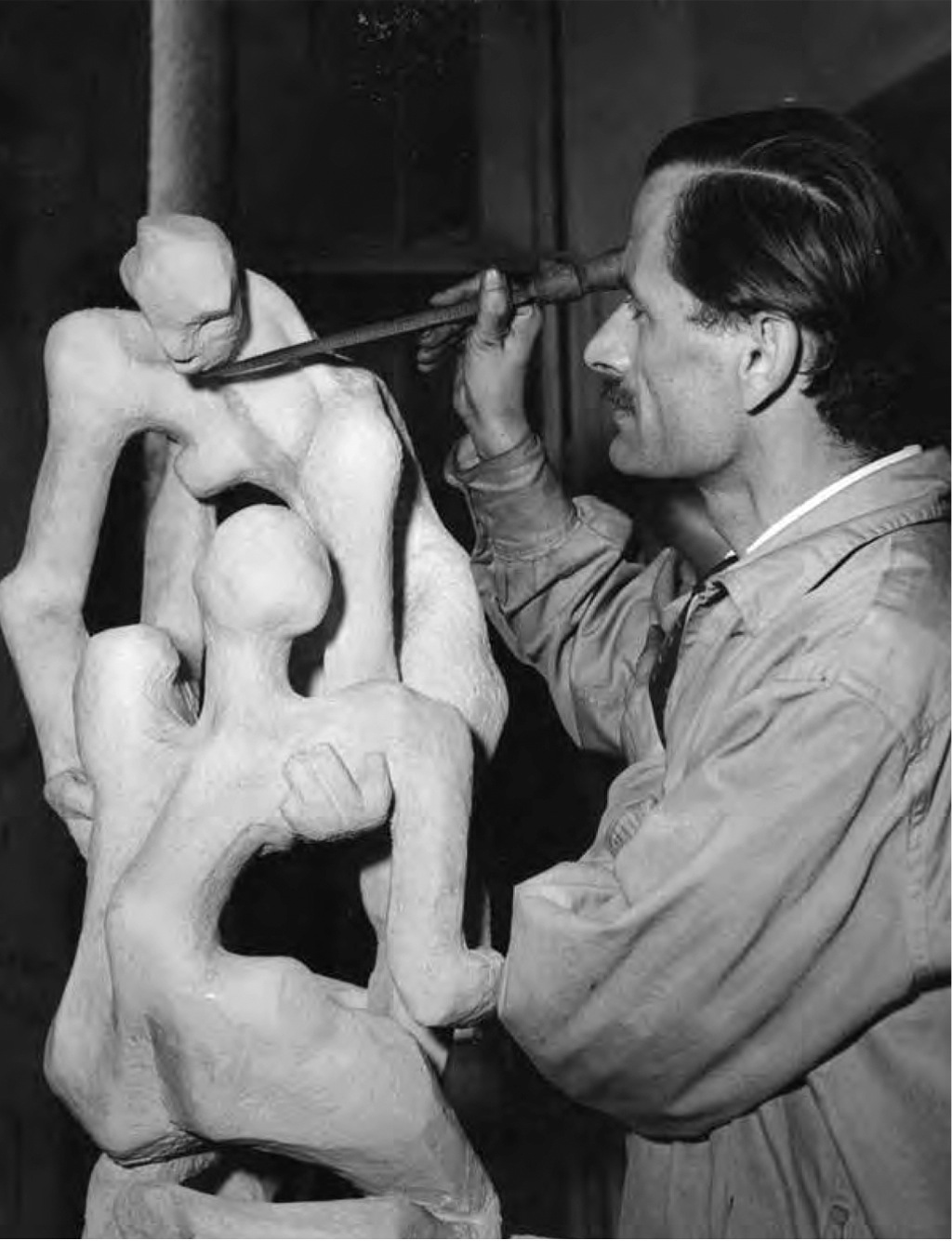
Michel Basbous in Ossip Zadkine's studio, Paris, France, 1954

Michel Basbous (1921–1981) was a Lebanese sculptor and painter known for his contributions to modernist sculpture in the Middle East. Born in Rachana, a small village in Lebanon, he integrated traditional influences into his modernist sculptures and played a role in developing Rachana as a cultural center.

Basbous's work is characterized by a strong connection to natural forms and the use of various materials such as wood, marble, bronze, and recycled objects. His sculptures often emphasized verticality, a characteristic associated with the themes of spirituality and human aspiration. His approach integrated the natural environment, creating pieces designed to interact with their surroundings. Basbous stated that the natural veins in stone or wood frequently influenced his creative process.

== Early life and education ==
Michel Basbous's early artistic interests were influenced by his father, a priest who also worked as a painter and calligrapher. During his childhood, Basbous experimented with shaping wood and stone, an early indication of his later focus on sculpture.

Basbous began his formal art education at the Académie Libanaise des Beaux-Arts (ALBA) from 1945 to 1949. He later received a scholarship from the Lebanese government, allowing him to further develop his skills at the Ecole Nationale Supérieure des Beaux-Arts (ENSBA) in Paris from 1949 to 1951.

== Career ==
In Paris, Basbous apprenticed under Ossip Zadkine from 1954 to 1955, where he was exposed to modernist principles while continuing to draw inspiration from traditional Lebanese forms. This experience influenced Basbous's artistic approach and reinforced his engagement with modernist sculptural principles.

Upon returning to Lebanon in the late 1950s, Basbous became involved in the emerging Lebanese modern art movement. In 1957, he taught sculpture at the American University of Beirut for a short period before returning to Rachana, where he established an open-air studio. His efforts contributed to Rachana's transformation into what became known as the “Museum Village.” Alongside his brothers, Alfred (1924–2006) and Joseph (1929–2001), he worked to develop the village as a hub for transdisciplinary art practices.

Despite the instability caused by the 1958 Lebanon Crisis, Basbous remained committed to his art. He exhibited works locally in Beirut and internationally, including in Paris (Musée d’Art Moderne and Musée Zadkine), Oxford (Ashmolean Museum), London (British Museum) and Japan (Hakone Open Air Museum and Ueno Royal Museum).

His work is in the permanent collection of the British Museum and the Barjeel Art Foundation.

== Legacy ==
Michel Basbous died in 1981, leaving behind a legacy in Lebanese and Middle Eastern modern art. His work is featured in major art institutions and public spaces worldwide.

Basbous's wife, Thérèse, and his son, Anachar Basbous, inherited his artistic heritage, with Anachar following in his father's footsteps to become a sculptor himself. Rachana remains a cultural destination, reflecting Basbous’s vision of integrating art into everyday life and the natural world.
