= Samer Mohdad =

Lebanese-Belgian photographer

- سامر معضاد
- Born: 1964 (age 61–62); Bzebdine, Lebanon
- Website: mohdad.arabimages.com

Samer Mohdad (Arabic: سامر معضاد, born 1964) is a Lebanese-Belgian photographer, visual artist and writer.

== Early life and education ==
Mohdad was born in Bzebdine, Lebanon in 1964. His family moved to Aley following the outbreak of the Lebanese Civil War. Mohdad moved to Belgium and obtained a degree in the art of photography from École supérieure des arts Saint-Luc de Liège.

== Career ==
Following his graduation in 1988, he joined Agence Vu in Paris. He held his first solo exhibition at Musée de l'Elysée in 1990. Also in 1990, Mohdad received an honorable mention in the World Press Photo award for General News In 1997 he established the Arab Image Foundation with Fouad Elkoury and Akram Zaatari in Beirut.

== Personal life ==
He also holds Belgian citizenship.

== Publications ==
- Les Enfants La Guerre, Liban 1985–1992 (1993)
- Retour à Gaza (1996)
- Mes Arabies (1999)
- Assaoudia: XXIe s. = XVe h. (2005)
- Beyrouth Mutations (2013)
- Voyage en Pays: Druze (2018)
