= 1964 SCCA National Championship Runoffs =

The 1964 American Road Race of Champions was the first running of the SCCA National Championship Runoffs. It took place on 14 and 15 November 1964 at the Riverside International Raceway. The ARRC was held as the non-championship final round of the SCCA National Sports Car Championship and the SCCA Divisional Championships. Most competitive drivers from SCCA's six divisions were invited to the event. No championships were contested that year as part of the Runoffs, and therefore, ARRC champions were not SCCA National Champions.

== Race results ==
Class winners for multi-class races in bold.

=== Race 1 - Formula Vee ===
The first race, held on November 14, was the Formula Vee race. It was held for 45 minutes and 23 laps.

Pos	Class	Qualified in class	Driver	No.	Car	Entrant	Division	Laps	Info
1	FV	unknown	(United States) Lewis Kerr	11	Formcar-VW	-	Northeast	23	Fastest lap in race.
2	FV	unknown	(United States) Roger Barr	13	Autodynamics D-1-VW	-	Northeast	23	
3	FV	unknown	(United States) William Duckworth	22	Formcar-VW	-	Southeast	23	
4	FV	unknown	(United States) Jerry Hansen	35	Formcar-VW	-	Central	23	
5	FV	unknown	(United States) Sheldon Dobkin	21	Beach Mk 5-VW	Over-Keys Motor Inc	Southeast	23	
6	FV	unknown	(United States) Jim Brady	52	Spectre-VW	-	Southwest	23	
7	FV	unknown	(United States) Robert Hubbard	41	Formcar-VW	-	Midwest	23	
8	FV	unknown	(United States) Boyd Hough	61	Formcar-VW	Morgensen Motors	Pacific	23	
9	FV	unknown	(United States) Guy McMurray	42	Formcar-VW	-	Midwest	22	
10	FV	unknown	(United States) Jim Downing	25	Formcar-VW	-	Southeast	22	
11	FV	unknown	(United States) Robert Docter	62	Crusader-VW	-	Pacific	22	
12	FV	unknown	(United States) John Neumeister	43	Formcar-VW	-	Midwest	22	
13	FV	unknown	(United States) Lars Giertz	53	Autodynamics D-1-VW	-	Southwest	22	
14	FV	unknown	(United States) John Grove	63	Crusader-VW	-	Pacific	22	
DNF	FV	unknown	(United States) Mak Kronn	32	Formcar-VW	-	Central	unknown	DNF
DNF	FV	unknown	(United States) Martin Grantham	51	Autodynamics D-1-VW	-	Southwest	unknown	DNF

=== Race 2 - H Production ===
The H Production race was held on November 14 for 45 minutes and 23 laps.

Pos	Class	Qualified in class	Driver	No.	Car	Entrant	Division	Laps	Info
1	HP	unknown	(United States) Fred Salo	31	Austin-Healey Sprite	Salo's Servi-Center	Central	23	Led laps 1, 17-23.
2	HP	unknown	(United Kingdom) Gilbert Page	11	Austin-Healey Sprite	-	Northeast	23	
3	HP	unknown	(United States) Clyde Cabrinha	63	Austin-Healey Sprite	-	Pacific	23	
4	HP	unknown	(United States) Robert Durham	51	Austin-Healey Sprite	-	Southwest	23	
5	HP	unknown	(United States) Richard Alley	41	Austin-Healey Sprite	-	Midwest	22	
6	HP	unknown	(United States) Dan Miller	53	Austin-Healey Sprite	-	Southwest	22	
7	HP	unknown	(United States) Bob Anderson	32	Austin-Healey Sprite	-	Central	22	
8	HP	unknown	(United States) Bill Cox	52	Austin-Healey Sprite	-	Southwest	22	
9	HP	unknown	(United States) Walt Biddle	33	Austin-Healey Sprite	-	Central	22	
10	HP	unknown	(United States) Hugh Major, Jr.	43	Austin-Healey Sprite	-	Midwest	22	
11	HP	unknown	(United States) Thomas Hukle	42	Austin-Healey Sprite	-	Midwest	18	
DNF	HP	1st	(United States) Roger Subith	61	Austin-Healey Sprite	-	Pacific	16	DNF (accident on lap 16). Led laps 2-16. Fastest lap in race.
DNF	HP	unknown	(United States) Danny Hopkins	62	Austin-Healey Sprite	-	Pacific	14	DNF

=== Race 3 - G Production ===
The G Production race was held on November 14 for 45 minutes and 23 laps.

Pos	Class	Qualified in class	Driver	No.	Car	Entrant	Division	Laps	Info
1	GP	unknown	(United States) Ed Barker	61	Triumph Spitfire	-	Pacific	23	Led laps 3-23. Fastest lap in race.
2	GP	unknown	(United States) Emmett Brown	62	MG Midget	-	Pacific	23	
3	GP	unknown	(United States) David Kiser	41	Triumph Spitfire	-	Midwest	23	
4	GP	unknown	(United States) Bob Clemens	33	Triumph Spitfire	-	Central	23	
5	GP	unknown	(United States) Erwin Lorincz	14	Triumph Spitfire	-	Northeast	23	
6	GP	unknown	(United States) Donald Bowman	32	Triumph Spitfire	-	Central	22	
7	GP	unknown	(United States) Walter Bass	42	Austin-Healey Sprite	-	Midwest	22	
8	GP	unknown	(United States) Roy Hopkins	52	Triumph Spitfire	-	Southwest	21	
DNF	GP	unknown	(United States) Bob Sharp	13	Datsun Sports SPL310	P. Bruk & Son	Northeast	7	DNF (lost wheel)
DNF	GP	unknown	(United States) Patricia Mernone	12	Morgan 4/4	-	Northeast	4	DNF
DNF	GP	unknown	(United States) Les Rutledge	31	Austin-Healey Sprite	-	Central	unknown	DNF
DNF	GP	unknown	(United States) Tommy Allen	43	Datsun Sports SPL310	-	Midwest	unknown	DNF
DNF	GP	unknown	(United States) Leavell Smith	51	Austin-Healey Sprite	-	Southwest	unknown	DNF
DNF	GP	unknown	(United States) George Davison	53	Austin-Healey Sprite	-	Southwest	unknown	DNF
DNF	GP	unknown	(United States) Lee Herbert	65	Triumph Spitfire	-	Pacific	unknown	DNF

=== Race 4 - H Modified ===
The H Modified race was held on November 14 for 45 minutes and 24 laps.

Pos	Class	Qualified in class	Driver	No.	Car	Entrant	Division	Laps	Info
1	HM	1st	(United States) Dan Parkinson	66	Dolphin America-Abarth	-	Pacific	24	Led laps 1-24. Fastest lap in race.
2	HM	2nd	(United States) John Gordon	15	OSCA S750 Special	-	Northeast	24	
3	HM	unknown	(United States) John Igleheart	14	Bobsy SR2-OSCA	-	Northeast	24	
4	HM	unknown	(United States) Chic Gast	64	Bobsy SR2-OSCA	-	Pacific	23	
5	HM	unknown	(United States) Frank Manley	45	DB Le Mans-Panhard	-	Midwest	23	
6	HM	unknown	(United States) Joe McClughan	54	BMW Special	-	Southwest	23	
7	HM	unknown	(United States) Robert Samm	56	Lambert III-Abarth	-	Southwest	21	
8	HM	unknown	(United States) Paul Coffield	35	Centaur Roadster-SAAB	-	Central	18	
DNF	HM	unknown	(United States) George Avent	24	Begra Mk III-Abarth	-	Southeast	unknown	DNF
DNF	HM	unknown	(United States) Martin Tanner	34	Martin T 5	-	Central	12	DNF
DNF	HM	unknown	(United States) Hugh Grammer	55	Bandini 750 Sport Siluro-Crosley	-	Southwest	unknown	DNF
DNF	HM	unknown	(United States) Ingvar Lindqvist	65	Lindqvist Special-SAAB	-	Pacific	unknown	DNF (spin)

=== Race 5 - E & F Modified ===
E Modified & F Modified drivers raced in a multi-class race held on November 14 for 45 minutes and 27 laps.

Pos	Class	Qualified in class	Driver	No.	Car	Entrant	Division	Laps	Info
1	**FM**	**unknown**	**(United States) Rick Muther**	**unknown**	**Lotus 23B-Ford**	-	**Pacific**	**27**	**Fastest lap in race.**
2	**EM**	**unknown**	**(United States) Ralph Wood**	**61**	**Elva Mk VII-Porsche**	-	**Pacific**	**27**	
3	EM	unknown	(United States) Dave Jordan	unknown	Dolphin America-Porsche	Precision Motor Cars	Pacific	27	
4	FM	unknown	(United States) Alan Friedland	14	Elva Mk VII-Porsche	George Friedland	Northeast	27	
5	FM	unknown	(United States) Michael Hall	34	Elva Mk VII-Ford	-	Central	27	
6	EM	unknown	(United States) Charlie Kolb	21	Porsche 718 RS	-	Southeast	27	
7	EM	unknown	(United States) Steve Froines	62	Porsche 718 RS 60	Dan Garcia	Pacific	27	
8	EM	unknown	(United States) Herb Wetanson	11	Porsche 718 RSK	-	Northeast	25	
9	FM	unknown	(United States) Martin Grantham	55	Merlyn MK 6	David Bland	Southwest	21	
DNF	EM	unknown	(United States) Henry Candler	44	Lotus 23B	-	Midwest	unknown	DNF
DNF	FM	unknown	(United States) Bud Morley	45	Elva Mk VII-BMW	-	Midwest	unknown	DNF
DNF	FM	unknown	(United States) Miles Gupton	65	Platypus-Porsche	-	Pacific	unknown	DNF
DNS	FM	unknown	(United States) Frank Monise	64	Lotus 23B-Ford	-	Pacific	-	DNS

=== Race 6 - E Production ===
The E Production race was held for on November 14 for 45 minutes and 25 laps.

Pos	Class	Qualified in class	Driver	No.	Car	Entrant	Division	Laps	Info
1	EP	1st	(United States) Alan Johnson	62	Porsche 356 1600	Scientific Automotive	Pacific	25	Fastest lap in race. Led laps 1-25.
2	EP	4th	(United States) Ron Grable	13	Porsche 356 Speedster	-	Northeast	25	
3	EP	unknown	(United States) Dennis Harrison	61	Porsche 356 1600	Scientific Automotive	Pacific	25	
4	EP	unknown	(United States) Bert Everett	12	Porsche 356	-	Northeast	25	
5	EP	unknown	(United States) Bob Connors	51	Porsche 356	-	Southwest	25	
6	EP	unknown	(United States) Howard Fowler	22	Porsche 356	-	Southeast	24	
7	EP	unknown	(United States) Gerry Mason	34	Porsche 356	-	Central	24	
8	EP	unknown	(United States) Bob Wenzel	42	Alfa Romeo Giulietta Veloce	-	Midwest	24	
9	EP	unknown	(United States) John Belperche	23	Porsche 356	-	Southeast	23	
10	EP	unknown	(United States) Ted Parrish	41	Morgan +4	-	Midwest	23	
11	EP	unknown	(United States) Joe Locario	52	Alfa Romeo Giulia	-	Southwest	22	
DNF	EP	unknown	(United States) Hans Ziereis	11	Porsche 356	-	Northeast	9	DNF
DNF	EP	unknown	(United States) Dave Tallasken	21	Elva Courier	-	Southeast	13	DNF
DNF	EP	unknown	(United States) Jerry Frydenlund	33	Porsche 356B	Delta Import Motors	Central	unknown	DNF
DNF	EP	unknown	(United States) Richard K. Roberts	43	Porsche 356	-	Midwest	unknown	DNF
DNF	EP	unknown	(United States) Ken Leith	53	Porsche 356	-	Southwest	unknown	DNF
DNF	EP	unknown	(United States) Walt Maas	63	Porsche 356	Lukes & Shorman	Pacific	unknown	DNF

=== Race 7 - F Production ===
The F Production race was held on November 14 for 45 minutes and 23 laps.

Pos	Class	Qualified in class	Driver	No.	Car	Entrant	Division	Laps	Info
1	FP	unknown	(United States) Richard Hull	33	Volvo P1800	-	Central	23	Fastest lap in race.
2	FP	9th	(United States) Robert Petrick	32	MG MGA	-	Central	23	
3	FP	unknown	(United States) Sheldon Shoff	11	Lotus Seven America	-	Northeast	23	
4	FP	unknown	(United States) Tim Burr	53	Triumph TR3	-	Southwest	23	
5	FP	unknown	(United States) Gerald Demele	63	Lotus Seven America	-	Pacific	23	
6	FP	unknown	(United States) Bernard Herstein	51	Triumph TR3	-	Southwest	22	
7	FP	unknown	(United States) Bill Bagby	52	Triumph TR3	-	Southwest	22	
8	FP	unknown	(United States) Elouise Norris	44	Triumph TR3	-	Midwest	22	
9	FP	unknown	(United States) Steve Froines	64	Sunbeam Alpine	-	Pacific	21	
DNF	FP	10th	(United States) Art Riley	13	Volvo P1800	-	Northeast	22	DNF (wheel)
DNF	FP	unknown	(United States) Bill Buchman	22	Sunbeam Alpine	-	Southeast	unknown	DNF
DNF	FP	7th	(United States) Dan Carmichael	31	Sunbeam Alpine	Sports Car Forum Inc	Central	unknown	DNF (spin)
DNF	FP	1st	(United States) Brooks Noah	41	Lotus Seven America	-	Midwest	unknown	DNF
DNF	FP	2nd	(United States) Bill Riggs	43	Triumph TR3	-	Midwest	unknown	DNF (handling)
DNF	FP	unknown	(United States) Jim Dittemore	62	Triumph TR3	-	Pacific	unknown	DNF

=== Race 8 - G Modified ===
The G Modified race was held on November 15 for 45 minutes and 26 laps.

Pos	Class	Qualified in class	Driver	No.	Car	Entrant	Division	Laps	Info
1	GM	2nd	(United States) Charles Barns	51	Merlyn MK 6-Cosworth	-	Southwest	26	Quickest lap in race (disputed). Led laps 17-26.
2	GM	unknown	(United States) William Molle	61	Incisor (Lotus 23B-Coventry Climax)	-	Pacific	26	Fastest lap in race (disputed). Led laps 1-16.
3	GM	unknown	(United States) Rich Erickson	63	Lotus 23	-	Pacific	26	
4	GM	unknown	(United States) Lynn Kysar	53	Merlyn MK 6	-	Southwest	26	
5	GM	unknown	(United States) Jim Baker	23	Lotus 23	-	Southeast	26	
6	GM	unknown	(United States) Tom Yeager	32	Merlyn MK 6-Ford	-	Central	25	
7	GM	unknown	(United States) Peter Helferich	31	Elva Mk VI	-	Central	25	
8	GM	unknown	(United States) Gordon Heald	11	Elva Mk VII-Coventry Climax	-	Northeast	25	
9	GM	unknown	(United States) Robert Kelce	41	Elva Mk VII	-	Midwest	25	
10	GM	unknown	(United States) O.M. MacLeran	unknown	Elva Mk VII	-	Central	24	
11	GM	unknown	(United States) Bernard Kemp	52	Merlyn	-	Southwest	13	
DNF	GM	unknown	(United States) Harry Banta	62	Genie Mk.5-Coventry Climax	-	Pacific	unknown	DNF

=== Race 9 - C Production ===
The C Production race was held on November 15 for 45 minutes and 25 laps.

Pos	Class	Qualified in class	Driver	No.	Car	Entrant	Division	Laps	Info
1	CP	3rd	(United States) Earl Jones	63	Morgan +4 Super Sports	-	Pacific	25	Led laps 5-25.
2	CP	unknown	(United States) John Siefkes	42	Lotus Super Seven	-	Midwest	25	
3	CP	unknown	(United States) John Gardella	31	Lotus Super Seven	-	Central	25	
4	CP	unknown	(United States) Ed Tucker	51	Lotus Elan	-	Southwest	24	
5	CP	unknown	(United States) Whit Talbott	34	Lotus Super Seven	-	Central	23	
6	CP	unknown	(United States) Ray Houchins	12	Lotus Elan	Team Houchins Racing	Northeast	22	Fastest lap in race.
7	CP	unknown	(United States) C. K. Thompson	23	Lotus Super Seven	-	Southeast	18	
DNF	CP	unknown	(United States) Michael Watson	62	Lotus Super Seven	-	Pacific	13	DNF
DNF	CP	1st	(United States) Joe Ward	61	Lotus Super Seven	-	Pacific	4	DNF. Led laps 1-5.
DNF	CP	unknown	(United States) Woody Adams	41	Lotus Super Seven	Captain Richard H. Adams	Midwest	unknown	DNF
DNF	CP	unknown	(United States) A. C. Langworthy	43	Lotus Super Seven	-	Midwest	unknown	DNF

=== Race 10 - Formula Junior & Libre ===
Formula Libre & Formula Junior drivers raced in a multi-class race held on November 15 for 45 minutes and 27 laps.

Pos	Class	Qualified in class	Driver	No.	Car	Entrant	Division	Laps	Info
1	**FL**	**1st**	**(United States) George Alderman**	**15**	**Cooper T53****-Alfa Romeo**	-	**Northeast**	**27**	**Fastest lap in race. Led laps 4-27.**
2	**FJr.**	**1st**	**(United States) Ron Herrera**	**61**	**Lotus 22-Ford**	-	**Pacific**	**27**	**Led laps 1-3.**
3	FL	unknown	(United States) G.M. O'Keiff	55	Lotus 27-Ford	-	Southwest	27	
4	FL	unknown	(United States) Don Burrows	65	BMC-Coventry Climax	-	Pacific	27	
5	FJr.	unknown	(United States) Alson Brizard	62	Cooper T56-Ford	-	Pacific	26	
6	FL	unknown	(United States) Boyd Groberg	66	Lotus 22-Ford	-	Pacific	26	
7	FJr.	unknown	(United States) Leonard Conda	41	Elva 300-Ford	-	Midwest	26	
8	FJr.	unknown	(United States) Richard Brown	31	Lotus 20-Ford	V. W. Green	Central	25	
9	FJr.	unknown	(United States) Neil Babbs	22	Bandini Formula Junior-Fiat	-	Southeast	16	
DNF	FJr.	unknown	(United States) Chuck Gounis	21	Elva-Ford	-	Southeast	unknown	DNF
DNF	FJr.	unknown	(United States) Gordon Gresham	42	Lotus 20-Ford	-	Midwest	unknown	DNF
DNF	FJr.	unknown	(United States) Joe Hutchinson	51	Lotus 20	-	Southwest	unknown	DNF
DNF	FJr.	unknown	(United States) Ed Tucker	52	Lotus 27-Ford	-	Southwest	unknown	DNF
DNF	FJr.	unknown	(United States) Pierre Phillips	63	Lotus 27-Ford	-	Pacific	unknown	DNF (oil leak)
DNF	FL	unknown	(United States) Bob O'Brien	64	Cooper	-	Pacific	unknown	DNF

=== Race 11 - C & D Modified ===
C Modified & D Modified drivers raced in a multi-class race held on November 15 for 45 minutes and 28 laps.

Pos	Class	Qualified in class	Driver	No.	Car	Entrant	Division	Laps	Info
1	**CM**	**unknown**	(United States) **Bart Martin**	**61**	**Cooper Monaco T49-Chevrolet**	**Grizzly Engineering**	**Pacific**	**28**	**Fastest lap in race. Led laps 3-11, 28.**
2	**DM**	**unknown**	**(United States) Jerry Titus**	**66**	**Webster 2-Litre-Coventry Climax**	Webster Racing Enterprises	**Pacific**	**28**	**Led laps 12-27.**
3	CM	unknown	(United States) Ralph Salyer	32	Cheetah GT Cro-Sal Special-Chevrolet	-	Central	28	
4	CM	unknown	(United States) William Wonder	12	Genie Mk.8-Ford	-	Northeast	27	
5	CM	unknown	(United States) Pete Voevodsky	62	Townsend Special Mk III-Pontiac	-	Pacific	27	
6	DM	unknown	(United States) Glenn Baldwin	35	Lotus 23C	-	Central	25	
7	DM	unknown	(United States) Owen Rutherford	34	Cooper Monaco T49-Maserati	-	Central	21	
8	DM	unknown	(United States) Richard Burns	unknown	Austin-Healey 100 S Special	-	Pacific	14	
DNF	CM	unknown	(United States) Dick Doane	33	Chevette-Chevrolet	-	Central	27	DNF (gas line). Led laps 1-2.
DNF	CM	unknown	(United States) Bob Montana	63	Cooper Monaco T49-Plymouth	-	Pacific	unknown	DNF
DNF	DM	unknown	(United States) John Jewett	65	Lotus Eleven-Plymouth	-	Pacific	unknown	DNF

=== Race 12 - A & B Production ===
A Production & B Production drivers raced in a multi-class race held on November 15 for 45 minutes and 27 laps. There were originally two separate races scheduled, but the entrant number was too low for two races.

Pos	Class	Qualified in class	Driver	No.	Car	Entrant	Division	Laps	Info
1	**AP**	**unknown**	**(United States) Ed Leslie**	**61**	**Shelby Cobra**	**Shelby American**	**Pacific**	**27**	**Fastest lap in race. Led laps 1-27.**
2	AP	unknown	(United States) Bob Johnson	31	Shelby Cobra	Shelby American	Central	27	
3	AP	unknown	(United States) Dick Guldstrand	62	Chevrolet Corvette Sting Ray	Boher Chevrolet	Pacific	26	
4	**BP**	**unknown**	**(United States) Merle Brennan**	**61**	**Jaguar XKE**	**Kjell Qvale**	**Pacific**	**26**	
5	BP	unknown	(United States) Paul Canary	33	Chevrolet Corvette	-	Central	26	
6	BP	unknown	(United States) David Dooley	41	Jaguar XKE	-	Midwest	25	
7	BP	unknown	(United States) Dan Carmichael	35	Sunbeam Tiger	-	Central	25	
8	BP	unknown	(United States) Fred Sutherland	63	Chevrolet Corvette	-	Pacific	25	
9	BP	unknown	(United States) Joe Mulholland	31	Jaguar XKE	-	Central	25	
10	BP	unknown	(United States) Don Yenko	11	Chevrolet Corvette	-	Northeast	25	Time penalty.
11	BP	unknown	(United States) John Coyle	62	Chevrolet Corvette	-	Pacific	24	
12	BP	unknown	(United States) John Bushell	12	Chevrolet Corvette	-	Northeast	24	
13	AP	unknown	(United States) Bill Steele	51	Shelby Cobra	-	Southwest	24	
14	BP	unknown	(United States) Brad Brooker	43	Chevrolet Corvette	-	Midwest	23	
15	BP	unknown	(United States) Louis Heuss	51	Jaguar XKE	-	Southwest	23	
16	BP	unknown	(United States) Jerry Henderson	44	Chevrolet Corvette	-	Midwest	20	
DNF	AP	unknown	(United States) Dan Gerber	34	Shelby Cobra	-	Central	13	DNF
DNF	AP	unknown	(United States) Harold Keck	11	Shelby Cobra	-	Northeast	7	DNF
DNF	AP	unknown	(United States) Chuck Parsons	63	Shelby Cobra	Randy Hilton	Pacific	0	DNF (accident)
DNF	AP	unknown	(United States) Dick Lang	33	Chevrolet Corvette Sting Ray	-	Central	0	DNF (spin)

=== Race 13 - D Production ===
The final race was the D Production race. It was held on November 15 for 45 minutes and 25 laps.

Pos	Class	Qualified in class	Driver	No.	Car	Entrant	Division	Laps	Info
1	DP	unknown	(United States) Bob Tullius	11	Triumph TR4	-	Northeast	25	Led laps 14-25.
2	DP	unknown	(United States) Jim Adams	61	MG MGB	Hollywood Sports Cars	Pacific	25	
3	DP	unknown	(United States) Norm Evans	63	Triumph TR4	-	Pacific	25	
4	DP	unknown	(United States) John Goans	41	Triumph TR4	-	Midwest	25	
5	DP	unknown	(United States) Chuck Cantwell	32	MG MGB	Overseas Imported Cars	Central	25	
6	DP	unknown	(United States) Eddie Kimmel	42	Triumph TR4	-	Midwest	24	
7	DP	unknown	(United States) Don Dillon	51	Triumph TR4	-	Southwest	24	
8	DP	unknown	(United States) Bruce Kellner	12	Triumph TR4	-	Northeast	23	Led laps 4-13.
9	DP	unknown	(United States) Jim Branam	34	MG MGB	-	Central	23	
10	DP	unknown	(United States) Harold St. John	22	Triumph TR4	-	Southeast	22	
11	DP	unknown	(United States) Lynn Beaumont	52	Austin-Healey 3000	-	Southwest	22	
12	DP	unknown	(United States) John Hill	24	Daimler SP250	-	Southeast	20	
DNF	DP	unknown	(United States) Jim Ladd	13	Austin-Healey 3000	Ladd Motors Inc.	Northeast	2	DNF (fatal accident). One of 2 fatal accidents in Runoffs history.
DNF	DP	unknown	(United States) Charles Gates	62	Triumph TR4	-	Pacific	2	DNF (accident)

== Legacy ==
The event has been a big success. More than 160 drivers have arrived to the ARRC, including future road racing stars such as Chuck Parsons, Jerry Titus, Rick Muther, Bob Sharp, Jerry Hansen, Bob Tullius, Ed Leslie, Jim Downing, Ron Grable, Dave Jordan, Dick Guldstrand and George Alderman. The race has been the first race from the late 1950s that saw amateur West Coast and East Coast racers compete against each other, as the SCCA National Sports Car Championship was East Coast-only and the USRRC, despite allowing amateur drivers to compete, was a pro championship.

The 1964 American Road Race of Champions started a new chapter in the history of American amateur road racing. The National Championship was cancelled for 1965 and the ARRC became the only interdivisional amateur road race. It was still a non-championship event until 1966, when Runoffs winners in each class became National Champions.

== Notes ==
Due to limited attention to SCCA amateur races at the time, the results are not fully complete and there are a lot of inaccuracies.

=== Formula Vee ===
Some sources say that Downing was the pole-sitter in race, which is not confirmed by the SCCA.

=== G Production ===
2 The SCCA site says Mernone ran for 4 laps, while other sources say she ran only for three laps.

=== E & F Modified ===
3 Some sources say Candler had an Elva Mk VII for the race.

=== F Production ===
4 Noah's pole is debated by the SCCA website, so Riggs could be the pole-sitter.

=== C Production ===
5 The SCCA website lists Ward running a Lotus Elan, but in the entry list he is listed running a Super Seven.
