= Annandale High School =

High school in Annandale, Virginia

Coordinates: 38°49′20″N 77°12′28″W

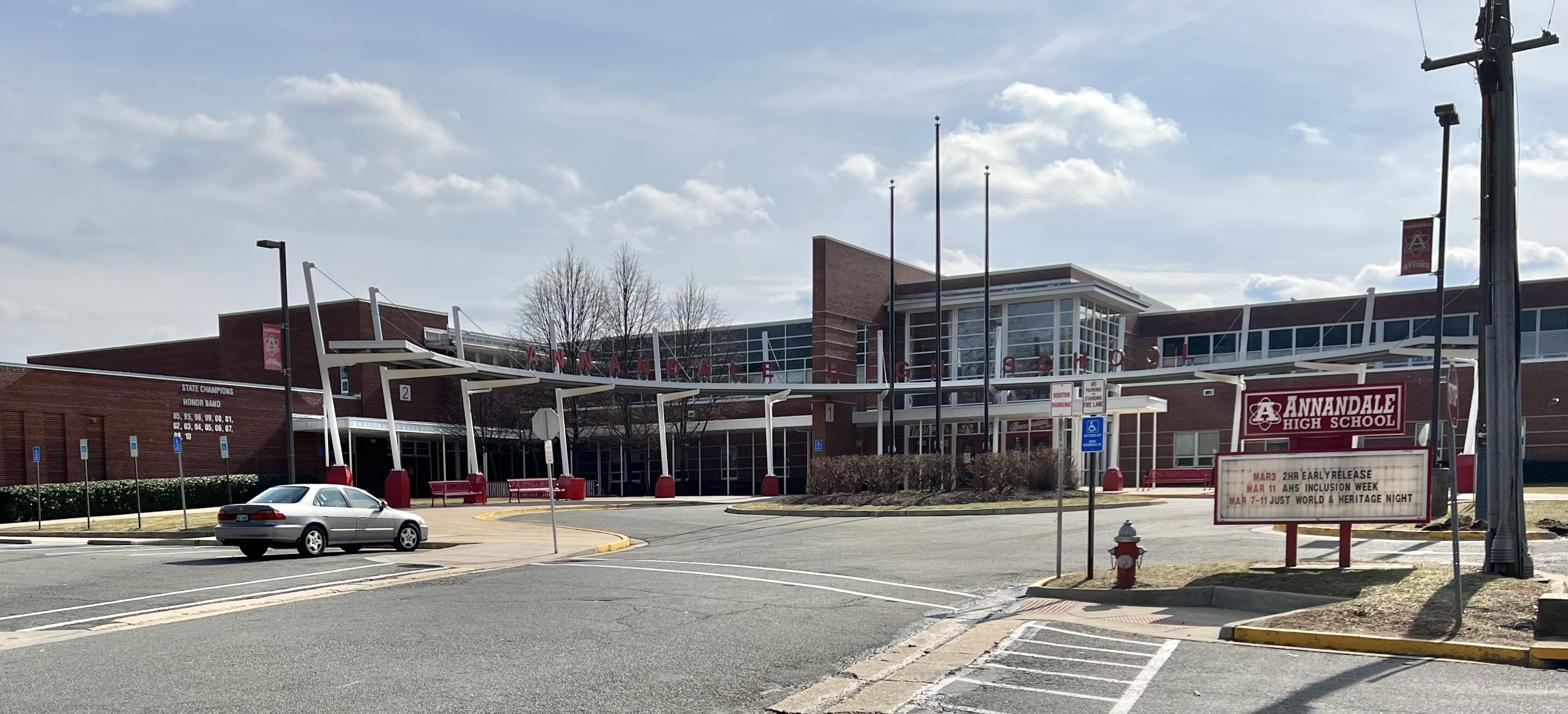

Location
- 4700 Medford Drive; Annandale, Virginia 22003

Information
- School type: Public, high school
- Founded: June 30, 1954; 72 years ago
- School district: Fairfax County Public Schools
- Principal: Shawn DeRose
- Faculty: 149.59 FTE (as of 2023-24)
- Grades: 9–12
- Enrollment: 2,192 (as of 2023-24) (2023–24)
- Student to teacher ratio: 14.65 (as of 2023-24)
- Language: English
- Campus type: Suburban
- Colors: Red and white
- Athletics conference: Gunston District, VHSL Class 6 Region C
- Mascot: Atom
- Feeder schools: Holmes Middle School, Poe Middle School, Robert Frost Middle School
- Website: www.fcps.edu/AnnandaleHS

Annandale High School is a public high school in Annandale, Virginia, United States. It is part of the Fairfax County Public Schools system.

The school's student body has been recognized for its high level of racial and cultural diversity since at least the 1980s. Students derive from over 90 countries and speak more than 50 languages.

== History ==
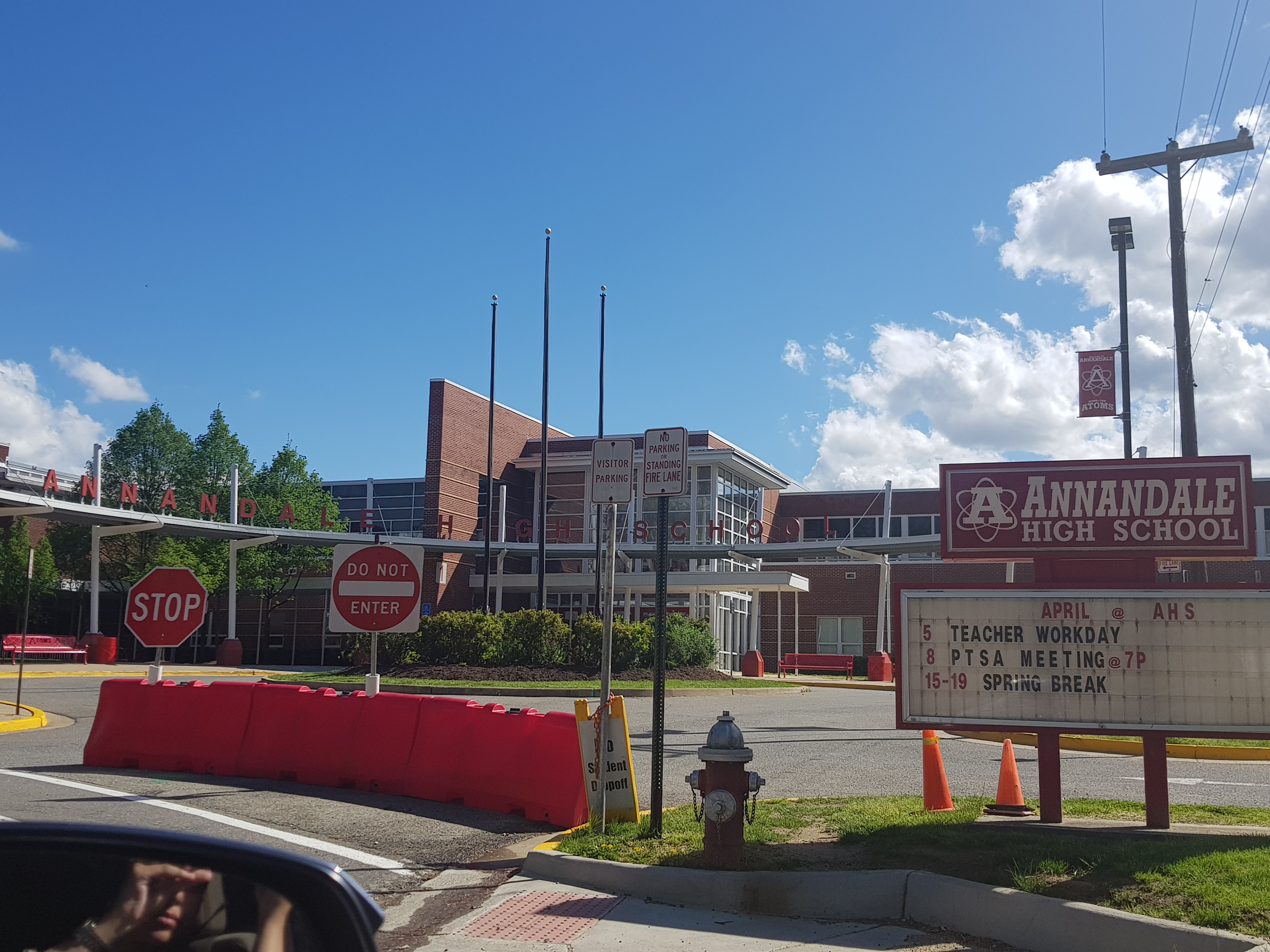
Annandale High School in 2019

Annandale was chosen in 1998 as the site and focus of the Race Initiative Advisory Board's round-table discussions on race and education. The event was hosted by members of the board, including Thomas Kean and William Winter, and chaired by historian John Hope Franklin. The discussions were held as part of U.S. President Bill Clinton's One America Initiative.

In 2006, U.S. Secretary of Education Margaret Spellings visited Annandale to announce that a $188,000 grant would be given to Fairfax County Public Schools to expand Arabic and Chinese programs, as part of the National Security Language Initiative. At the time, Annandale students taking Arabic were among "the less than 1 per cent of high school students studying languages deemed critical."

In October 2011, AHS was again noted by the White House for its cultural diversity, hosting a visit by First Lady Michelle Obama and First Lady of South Korea Kim Yoon-ok, both of whom praised the school's widespread ethnic make-up in speeches to the student body. During her address, Michelle Obama said, “This is the perfect place for you to find out who you are and what you want to become, and that’s really what education is all about.” The visits were accompanied by a ceremony featuring Grammy-nominated violinist Jennifer Koh. At the time, Madame Kim was traveling on a state visit to the U.S. with her husband, Korean President Lee Myung-bak, who were invited as guests of honor to a White House dinner that week after Congress approved the United States–Korea Free Trade Agreement. During the 2009–2010 school year, Korean and other Asian-Americans represented 22 percent of the AHS student body.

=== Demographics ===
In 2024-2025 Annandale's student body was 53.50% Hispanic, 18.18% Asian, 12.95% White, 12.66% Black and 2.71% other. During the 2024-2025 school year, 47.50% of the student body received free or reduced price lunch, the year prior it was 60.69%. 90.81% of the school was proficient in English. AHS is considered one of the most diverse schools among FCPS, itself one of the most diverse school districts in the country.

The 2009–2010 school year marked the first year that Hispanic students represented a plurality of Annandale students, and the first year in the school's history that any racial group other than White students represented a plurality within the student body.

In the aftermath of the Fall of Kabul (2021), there has been a small but growing Afghani population in Fairfax County schools including Annandale High School.

=== The A-Blast ===
The A-Blast is Annandale High School's student-run, student-sponsored newspaper. It achieved several awards and recognitions from the late 1990s to 2009, during which the paper won a number of National Scholastic Press Association Pacemaker Awards, placed among the Best-in-Show at a variety of NSPA national conventions, and won the Columbia Scholastic Press Association Gold Crown Award (in 2009).

The A-Blast is a Washington Post Young Journalists Development Program student newspaper. The paper's writers and editors receive publishing and content-related guidance from Post professional staff, and periodically visit The Washington Post headquarters in Washington, D.C., for collaborative workshops. A-Blast editors regularly participate in Post programs for high school students, including the High School Writing Seminar and the High School Journalism Workshop. The A-Blast is printed on The Washington Post press in Springfield, VA.

The A-Blast uses WordPress as its technology platform and is hosted by School Newspapers Online.

=== Football program ===
Annandale High School has one of the most storied football traditions in Northern Virginia. Over the past 50 years, the Atoms have captured six VHSL state championships—in 1965, 1967, 1972, 1978, 1993, and 1994—and numerous district titles. Historically, Annandale competed in the Potomac District before VHSL redistricting moved the school into the Patriot District, and they now compete in the National District.

Annandale's 1978 team is regarded as one of the most dominant in Virginia high school football history. Coached by Bob Hardage, the Atoms completed an undefeated season and were ranked #1 in the nation by the National Sports Service.

The program enjoyed a strong run in the mid-2000s, winning Patriot District titles in 2005, 2006, 2007, and 2009 (the 2009 title was shared with West Springfield High School). Despite regular season dominance, the Atoms faced early exits in the postseason, falling to first-round opponents each of those years.

=== Boys' basketball ===
Annandale High School’s boys’ basketball program has a long-standing presence in Northern Virginia high school athletics. The Atoms have fielded competitive teams across multiple decades, earning regional and district recognition, particularly during the 1980s and early 1990s.

One of the program’s high points came in 1988 when Annandale advanced to the Northern Region championship game, falling just short of a state tournament berth. The team remained a regular fixture in regional tournaments through the early 1990s, known for its physical play and disciplined coaching under then-head coach Walter Wolfe.

More recently, the Atoms experienced a resurgence in the 2021–22 season, finishing second in the National District and qualifying for the 6C Region Tournament. The squad was led by a balanced offense and strong perimeter defense, earning praise for its team-oriented approach and development of younger players.

=== Boys' baseball ===
The basketball program reached a peak in the early 1990s under longtime head coach Mike Scott, capturing district titles and making multiple appearances in the Northern Region tournament. The 1992 and 1993 squads were particularly strong, known for their dominant pitching and defensive fundamentals, with several players advancing to play college baseball at the NCAA Division II and III levels.

More recently, Annandale has made steady progress in rebuilding the program. In 2017, the Atoms posted their first winning season in over a decade and advanced to the second round of the regional playoffs after upsetting favored West Potomac in extra innings.

The team continues to emphasize fundamentals, pitching development, and leadership, with many players participating in local travel leagues during the offseason. The program also benefits from strong support within the school community and a renovated baseball field completed in 2021, which includes upgraded dugouts and a turf infield.

=== Additional history ===
Opening its doors in 1954, Annandale High School had 1,000 students, ranging in grades eight-eleven. During this time, the students voted to call themselves "Atoms" after the influence from U.S. president Dwight D. Eisenhower's speech called "Atoms for Peace."

The former Thomas Jefferson High School (Jefferson, TJHS), originally occupied the FCPS building of the current TJHSST. Over a two-year period, from 1985 to 1987, the Jefferson students were merged into Annandale. The former TJHS students, now Annandale seniors, were appropriately given the one-time special distinction to use a dual name, TJHS/AHS, for school year 1987–88. No students from Jefferson or TJHSST graduated in 1988.

== Academics ==
=== Rankings ===
Annandale High School was ranked #122, with a score of 1.391, in The Washington Post's 2010 Challenge Index, an annual ranking of public high schools in the Washington Metropolitan Area. Each school's score, and rank, was based on a simple formula: "divide the number of Advanced Placement, International Baccalaureate or other college-level tests a school gave in 2009 by the number of graduating seniors." 172 schools were ranked in 2010. In 2008 Annandale placed #105 (out of 166) in the Challenge Index, with a score of 1.542, and in 2007 it was ranked #107 (out of 190), with a score of 1.425.

=== Annandale/Fairfax County Public Schools realignment ===
In 2010, Fairfax County Public Schools (FCPS) initiated a boundary study to address significant overcrowding at Annandale High School (AHS), which at the time was operating at approximately 120% of its capacity, with projections indicating further increases in enrollment.

To alleviate the overcrowding, FCPS considered several redistricting options. These included reassigning students from Annandale to nearby schools such as Falls Church High School, Lake Braddock Secondary School, and W.T. Woodson High School.

The proposed realignment sparked significant pushback from parts of the community. In response, a grassroots group of parents and residents formed what became known as the \"Annandale Border Control Force.\" Their goal was to protect AHS’s existing attendance boundaries, especially in the face of proposals that would reassign key neighborhoods. Members of the group argued that removing portions of Annandale would erode the school's socioeconomic and cultural diversity, which they viewed as central to its identity.

Despite multiple public hearings and strong advocacy, the Fairfax County School Board voted in favor of a boundary adjustment plan in early 2011. As a result, beginning with the 2012–2013 academic year, several communities—including parts of Wakefield Chapel—were reassigned to schools such as Woodson High School.

More recently, FCPS revisited the issue in 2025, proposing a boundary change that would reassign 372 students from Holmes Middle School to Annandale High School in order to simplify a split feeder pattern and promote continuity across school levels.

=== Enrollment ===
Enrollment at Annandale High School (AHS) has fluctuated over the past several decades in response to demographic trends, housing development, and boundary adjustments by Fairfax County Public Schools (FCPS).

During the 1995–1996 school year, enrollment at AHS surpassed 2,000 students for the first time. Enrollment continued to grow steadily throughout the late 1990s and early 2000s, peaking at 2,568 students during the 2003–2004 academic year.

By the 2007–2008 school year, AHS enrollment dipped to a ten-year low of approximately 2,045 students, partly due to redistricting and shifting neighborhood demographics. However, enrollment rebounded to 2,257 students in the 2009–2010 school year.

As of the 2021–2022 academic year, AHS reported an enrollment of 2,121 students, with demographic data showing a student body that is 58.3% Hispanic, 17.7% Asian, 12.6% Black, and 8.2% White. The school continues to serve one of the most diverse student populations in the county.

Enrollment has remained above 2,000 students each year since the mid-1990s, although FCPS has made periodic adjustments to feeder patterns and school boundaries, particularly in response to overcrowding concerns.

=== Academic programs ===
AHS has the following FCPS Programs:

- Advancement Via Individual Determination (AVID)
- Early Identification Program (EIP)
- English for Speakers of Other Languages (ESOL)
- International Baccalaureate Middle Years Program (IBMYP)
- International Baccalaureate Program (IB)
- Transitional High School Program
- Special Education- servicing Learning Disabilities, Emotional Disabilities, MR/DD Autism and MOD.
- In addition to standard foreign languages (Latin, French, Spanish), Arabic is offered, making Annandale one of the few high schools in the country to offer such a program.

== Notable alumni ==
- Atia Abawi, author and former CNN and NBC News foreign correspondent; graduated AHS in 1999
- Jim Acosta, CNN chief White House correspondent; graduated AHS in 1989
- Larry Asante, safety for Tampa Bay Buccaneers, Oakland Raiders; 5th round draft pick in 2010 (did not graduate from AHS; graduated from Hayfield Secondary School)
- Tony Cavalero, actor, played Dewey Finn on Nickelodeon's "School of Rock"
- Roger Craig, class of 1995, recurrent Jeopardy! contestant who holds a number of the show's all-time records
- Ray Crittenden, football player for New England Patriots (1993–94), San Diego Chargers (1997) and CFL (1995–96)
- James R. Clapper, Director of National Intelligence, retired Lieutenant General of U.S. Air Force (did not graduate from AHS)
- Amanda Cromwell, head coach for UCLA Bruins women's soccer team and former United States women's national soccer team player
- Mark Duffner, football coach, senior defensive assistant for the Cincinnati Bengals
- Faisal Gill, former senior policy advisor at Department of Homeland Security
- Clarence Goodson, soccer player San Jose Earthquakes of Major League Soccer (did not graduate from AHS)
- Dave Grohl, rock musician, instrumentalist, and singer-songwriter; lead vocalist, guitarist, and songwriter for Foo Fighters, drummer for Nirvana (did not graduate from AHS)
- Gina Grosso, Assistant Secretary of Veterans Affairs for Human Resources / Operations, Security and Preparedness
- Fawn Hall, former secretary to Lt. Colonel Oliver North, notable figure in Iran-Contra Affair
- Bill Hamid, American soccer player for D.C. United
- Mark Hamill, actor and voice artist, best known for playing Luke Skywalker in original Star Wars trilogy (did not graduate from AHS)
- Mark Hoppus, bass guitarist and vocalist, co-founder and member of Blink-182 and +44, host of Hoppus on Music (did not graduate from AHS)
- Rob Huebel, comedian and actor, known for playing Owen Maestro in television series Childrens Hospital, and himself in series Human Giant; voice of Anchorman in Despicable Me
- Susan Hutchison (Susan Sylvester), television news journalist, politician (class of 1972)
- Robin Jennings, former MLB player (Chicago Cubs, Oakland Athletics, Colorado Rockies, Cincinnati Reds)
- Patricia Mernone (class of 1957), sports car racer in the 1960s
- George Nolen (class of 1974), CEO of Siemens USA
- Lucien Samaha, photographer and artist, original member of the Arab Image Foundation
- Jocelyn Seagrave, actress, best known for Guiding Light, Pacific Palisades
- Carl Strong (class of 1976), former U.S. soccer midfielder
- Sonny Utz, former football fullback for Dallas Cowboys, Atlanta Falcons, Winnipeg Blue Bombers
- Michael Vitez, journalist for The Philadelphia Inquirer, and winner of the 1997 Pulitzer Prize in Explanatory Journalism
- Dylan Walsh, (class of 1981), actor, known for his role as Dr. Sean McNamara in television series Nip Tuck and as Detective Al Burns in series Unforgettable

== Literature ==
Kugler, Eileen Gale (2003). Debunking the Middle-Class Myth: Why Diverse Schools Are Good For All Kids. Scarecrow Education Press.
