= Gunston District =

The Gunston District was a high school sports district in Northern Virginia that competed in the Virginia High School League. The schools were mostly from the Alexandria area.

== About the district ==
What used to be the old Alexandria District in 1965 became the Gunston District two years later in 1967 with members Edison, Fort Hunt, Groveton, Mount Vernon, Robert E. Lee and West Springfield. In 1985 Fort Hunt and Groveton High Schools consolidated into West Potomac High School. In 1994, the Gunston District was abandoned as part of a realignment within the Northern Region, until 2017 when the district was revived when the VHSL realigned the districts and regions all together. As part of the VHSL's 4-year realignment, the National and Gunston Districts were consolidated and kept the National District name thus ending the 2nd incarnation of the Gunston District.

== Membership History ==
=== Final members (2020-21) ===
- Annandale Atoms of Annandale
- Hayfield Hawks of Alexandria
- Mount Vernon Majors of Alexandria
- T.C. Williams Titans of Alexandria
- West Potomac Wolverines of Alexandria

=== Former members ===
- Edison Eagles of Alexandria (1967-1994)
- Fort Hunt Federals of Alexandria (1967-1975, 1976-1985) consolidated into West Potomac
- Groveton Tigers of Alexandria (1967-1985) consolidated into West Potomac
- Lake Braddock Bruins of Burke (1974-1975)
- Robert E. Lee Lancers of Springfield (1967-1994) now John R. Lewis
- Thomas Jefferson Colonials of Alexandria (1975-1977)
- Thomas Jefferson S&T Colonials of Alexandria (1988-1994)
- West Springfield Spartans of Springfield (1967-1975)
