= Nolen =

Nolen is a surname. Notable people with the surname include:

- Billy Nolen, American government official
- Gabbie Nolen (born 1982), American country music singer-songwriter
- George Nolen, American business executive
- Jimmy Nolen, American guitarist
- John Nolen (1869–1937), American landscape architect
- LaShyra Nolen (born 1995), American medical student and science communicator
- Luke Nolen (born 1980), Australian jockey
- Paul Nolen (1929–2009), American basketball player
- Timothy Nolen (1941–2023), American actor and baritone
- W.L. Nolen (1943–1970), American convict
- Walter Nolen (born 2003), American football player
- William A. Nolen (1928–1986), American surgeon and author

== See also ==
- Susan Nolen-Hoeksema (1959–2013), American psychologist
- Nolan (surname)
- Leonard Nolens (1947–2025), Belgian poet and diary writer
- Wiel Nolens (1860–1931), Dutch politician and Roman Catholic priest
