= Akram Zaatari =

Lebanese filmmaker (born 1966)

Akram Zaatari (born 1966) is a Lebanese filmmaker, photographer, archival artist and curator. In 1997, he co-founded the Arab Image Foundation with photographers Fouad Elkoury, and Samer Mohdad. His work is largely based on collecting, studying and archiving the photographic history of the Arab World.

Zaatari was selected to represent Lebanon at the 2013 Venice Biennale by Sam Bardaouil and Till Fellrath, curators for the Lebanese Pavilion.

== Early life ==
Zaatari was born in Sidon, Lebanon year: 1966.

== Work ==
He has been exploring issues pertinent to post-war Lebanon. He investigates the way television mediates territorial conflicts and wars, and is particularly interested in logic of religious and national resistance movements, and the circulation and production of images in the context of today's geographic division in the Middle East. His work has been widely exhibited worldwide in biennales and venues such as the Centre Pompidou and is in the permanent collection of museums such as Tate Modern and the Thyssen Bornemisza Contemporary.

== Filmography ==
- Majnounak (Crazy of You), 1997
- Red Chewing Gum, 2000
- Her + Him VAN LEO, 2001
- How I love you, 2001
- This Day (al yaoum), 2003
- In this house, 2005
- Tomorrow Everything Will Be Alright, 2010
- On Photography People and Modern Times, 2010
- Letter to a Refusing Pilot, 2013

== Awards ==
- Grand Prize of the 17th International Contemporary Art Festival SESC_Videobrasil in São Paulo (2011)

== Publications ==
- The Vehicle. Picturing moments of transition in a modernizing society (Arab Image Foundation and Mind the Gap, 1999)
- Mapping Sitting (Arab Image Foundation and Mind the Gap, 2002)
- Hashem el Madani: Studio Practices (Arab Image Foundation, Mind the Gap and the Photographers' Gallery, 2004)
- Hashem el Madani: Promenades (Arab Image Foundation and Mind the Gap, 2007)
- Earth of Endless Secrets (Portikus and Beirut Art Center, 2010)
- Against Photography (Kaph Books and MACBA, 2018)
- Building Index. Rifat Chadirji , edited by Akram Zaatari and Mark Wasiuta (Arab Image Foundation and Kaph Books, 2018)

== Exhibitions ==
=== Solo exhibitions ===
- Akram Zaatari. Objects of Study, Galerie Sfeir Semler, Hamburg, 2007
- Earth of Endless Secrets. Writing for a Posterior Time, Beirut Art Center, 2009
- Akram Zaatari. Nature Morte, Baltic Mill, 2009
- Akram Zaatari Composition for Two Wings, Oslo, Kunstnernes Hus, 2011
- Liverpool Biennial Spotlight Akram Zaatari, Liverpool Biennial, 2012
- This Day at Ten, Le Magasin-Cnac, Grenoble, 2012
- Akram Zaatari, Letter to a refusing pilot, Lebanese Pavilion, Arsenale, 55. Venice Biennial, Venice, Italy, 2013
- Akram Zaatari, All Is Well, Agnes Etherington Art Centre, Queens University, Kingston, ON, 2013–2014
- Akram Zaatari, Unfolding, Moderna Museet, Stockholm, 2015
- Akram Zaatari, Against Photography. An Annoted History of the Image Arab Foundation, MACBA, Barcelona, 2017
- Akram Zaatari. The Third Window, Sfeir Semler Gallery, Beirut 2018

=== Group exhibitions ===
- Documenta (13), Kassel, 2012
- Across Boundaries. Focus on Lebanese Photography, curated by Tarek Nahas, Beirut Art Fair 2018
- In 2023, Akram Zaatari participated in BIENALSUR (Bienal Internacional de Arte Contemporáneo del Sur), presenting work in the exhibition Modos de desvanecimiento at the Sursock Museum in Beirut, Lebanon.
