= Zeina Abirached =

Lebanese illustrator

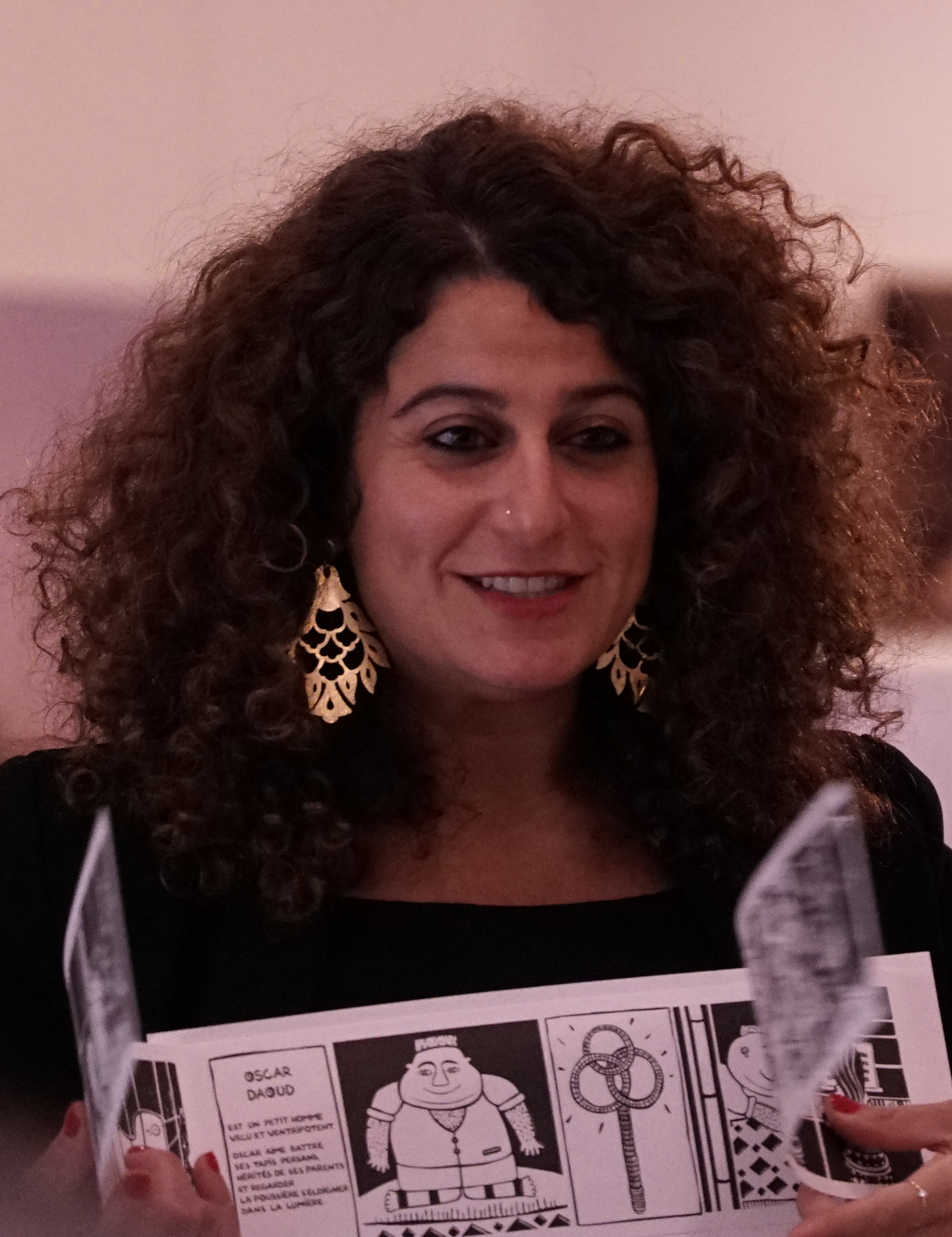
- Zeina Abirached in 2019
- Born: 1981 (age 44–45); Beirut, Lebanon

Zeina Abirached (born 1981 in Beirut, Lebanon) is a Lebanese illustrator, graphic novelist and comic artist. She studied at the Académie Libanaise des Beaux-Arts ALBA and the École nationale supérieure des arts décoratifs. Her books are based on autobiographic narratives related to her childhood within the Lebanese Civil War and on the history of her family, including the story of her grandfather who invented a new kind of piano.

== Work ==
Zeina Abirached was born in 1981 and was raised in a war-torn Beirut. In 2002, she produced a little comic book composed of black and white drawings within the Atelier de Recherche ALBA. Her training as a commercial designer brought a decorative approach and inventive graphic solutions to her black-and-white comics. She later moved to Paris and continued producing comics based on individual and collective memory and on archival documents. She finds her inspiration in old photographs and TV footage, and in the work of comic authors such as David B and Jacques Tardi.

Abirached's memoir Mourir, partir, revenir - Le Jeu des hirondelles was the first graphic novel to be awarded the FACE French Voices Grant for publication of a contemporary French-language work in English, given by the PEN American Center and the French Embassy. It was published by the Graphic Universe division of Lerner Publishing Group in 2012 under the title A Game for Swallows: To Die, To Leave, To Return. Through her works, she portrays not just the memoirs of the civil war in Lebanon, but also reclaims a history that has been either ignored by official accounts of the war or been forgotten completely. I remember Beirut, one of her graphic novels which have been translated into English, was inspired by the famous French author Georges Perec.

The Centre Belge de la Bande Déssinée (The Comics Art Museum) in Brussels included Zeina Abirached and her book Le Piano oriental in a permanent exhibit called "The Art of the Comic Strip."

== Publications ==
- (2023) Le prophète. Adaptation of The Prophet by Kahlil Gibran. Paris: Seghers.
- (2018) Prendre refuge. Co-written with Mathias Énard. Tournai: Casterman.
- (2015) Le piano oriental. Tournai: Casterman.
- (2012) Mourir, partir, revenir - Le Jeu des hirondelles. Paris: Cambourakis.
  - Translated as A Game for Swallows: To Die, To Leave, To Return. Graphic Universe/Lerner Publishing Group. (2012)
- (2011) Agatha de Beyrouth. Paris: Cambourakis.
- (2009) Je me souviens. Paris: Cambourakis.
- (2006) 38, rue Youssef Semaani. Paris: Cambourakis.
- (2006) Beyrouth Catharsis. Paris: Cambourakis.
