= Arab Image Foundation =

Organization for photography from the Middle East, North Africa and the Arab diaspora

- المؤسسة العربية للصورة
- Established: 1997
- Location: Beirut, Lebanon
- Type: Photography
- Collection size: 500,000
- Director: Rana Nasser Eddin
- Website: www.arabimagefoundation.org

The Arab Image Foundation (Arabic: المؤسسة العربية للصورة, al-Muʾassasah al-ʿArabiyyah lil-Ṣūrah) is a non-profit organization established in Beirut in 1997. It aims to track down, collect, preserve and study photographs from the Middle East, North Africa and the Arab diaspora. Its expanding collection includes more than 600,000 photographic objects from Lebanon, Syria, Palestine, Jordan, Egypt, Morocco, Iraq, Iran, Mexico, Argentina, and Senegal.

== History ==
Arab Image Foundation was created in 1997 by photographers Fouad Elkoury and Samer Mohdad, and artist Akram Zaatari as a reaction to the lack of photographic archives in the region and the rapid disappearance of the few that remained. Lucien Samaha was one of the original members of the Arab Image Foundation. The collections reveal a large aspect of the social history of the Arab World, including the picture that Arabs have constructed of themselves since the creation of photography.

The Foundation has become internationally and regionally recognized as the leading photographic institution in the Middle East. In addition to housing and conserving hundreds of thousands of photographs, the Foundation has spearheaded conservations and preservation projects in the Middle East, co-sponsoring workshops to disseminate the knowledge and skills needed to identify, restore, and conserve the Arab world's large photographic archive.

In addition to on site facilities including a public space, a library, a research center and a laboratory, the AIF has organized multiple gallery and museum exhibits, and produced book publications, monographs, films, and collectible merchandise, such as postcards and posterbook publications and films. The foundation also runs a prestigious residency program for artists and scholars.

== Governance ==
The Foundation is governed by a Board of Directors and a General Assembly. The current Board of Directors (2021–2024) is composed of Vartan Avakian, Donald Choubassi, Yasmine Eid-Sabbagh, Fabiola Hanna, Kristine Khouri, and Hrair Sarkissian.

The General Assembly includes Zeina Arida, Vartan Avakian, Negar Azimi, Lara Baladi, Karl Bassil, Donald Choubassi, Yasmine Eid-Sabbagh, Fabiola Hanna, Kristine Khouri, Khaled Malas, Sarah Morris, Issam Nassar, Hrair Sarkissian, and Tamara Sawaya.

== Projects ==
=== Exhibitions ===
- Les Martyrs de Qana, Project by Doha Shams, curated by Samer Mohdad (1997)
- Liban Intime 1900-1960, Curated by Samer Mohdad and Fouad el Khoury (1998)
- Portrait du Caire: Alban, Armand and Van Leo, Curated by Akram Zaatari (1999)
- Albums Marocains 1900-1960, Curated by Yto Barrada (1999)
- The Vehicle. Picturing moments of transition in a modernizing society, Curated by Akram Zaatari (1999)
- Palestine before '48, Curated by Akram Zaatari (1999)
- Van Leo, Curated by Akram Zaatari (2000)
- Pratiques photographiques au Liban (1900–1960) Curated by Akram Zaatari (2001)
- Mapping Sitting. On Portraiture and Photography. A project by Walid Raad and Akram Zaatari (2002)
- Arts et couleurs .Curated by Lara Baladi (2004)
- Hashem el Madani: Practices, An ongoing project by Akram Zaatari (2004)
- Hashem el Madani: Promenades, An ongoing project by Akram Zaatari (2006)
- Hashem el Madani: Itinerary, An ongoing project by Akram Zaatari (2007)
- How beautiful is Panama! A photographic conversation from Burj al-Shamali camp, Initiated by Yasmine Eid-Sabbagh and Simon Lourié (2008)
- An Uncanny Impulse - The Mohsen Yammine collection at the Arab Image Foundation, curated by Marc Mouarkech and Clémence Cottard (2017)
- Against Photography - An annotated history of the Arab Image Foundation, curated by Akram Zaatari (2017)
- Des possibles de la photographie. La collection 0069FA : une archive à l'œuvre, curated by Clémence Cottard-Hachem and Marc Mouarkech, Rencontres d'Arles (2019)

=== Publications ===
- Histoires Intimes Liban 1900-1960 (Actes Sud, 1997)
- Portraits du Caire (Actes Sud, 1999)
- The Vehicle. Picturing moments of transition in a modernizing society. Edited by Akram Zaatari (Arab Image Foundation and Mind the Gap, 1999)
- Mapping Sitting. Edited by Karl Bassil, Zeina Maasri and Akram Zaatari in collaboration with Walid Raad (Arab Image Foundation and Mind the Gap, 2002)
- Review of Photographic Memory. Edited by Jalal Toufic (Arab Image Foundation, 2004)
- Hashem el Madani: Studio Practices. Edited by Karl Bassil, Lisa Le Feuvre and Akram Zaatari, (Arab Image Foundation, Mind the Gap and the Photographers' Gallery, 2004)
- Hashem el Madani: Promenades (Arab Image Foundation and Mind the Gap, 2007)
- A Lebanese Archive by Ania Dabrowska from the collection of Diab Alkarssifi (Book Works and Arab Image Foundation, 2015)
- Traversées photographiques. Le journal du docteur Cottard , edited by Gregory Buchakjian and Clémence Cottard Hachem (Arab Image Foundation, 2017)
- Building Index. Rifat Chadirji , edited by Akram Zaatari and Mark Wasiuta (Arab Image Foundation and Kaph Books, 2018)

=== Films ===
- Jours tranquilles en Palestine (Fouad Elkoury and Sylvain Roumette, 1998)
- Her+Him Van Leo (Akram Zaatari, 2001)

=== Platforms ===
- History of the Last Things Before the Last: Art as Writing History (a symposium proposed by Clément Chéroux and Akram Zaatari, organized by the Centre Pompidou and the Arab Image Foundation, 2012)
- Middle East Photograph Preservation Initiative (MEPPI)
