= Lamia Ziadé =

Lebanese illustrator and visual artist (born 1968)

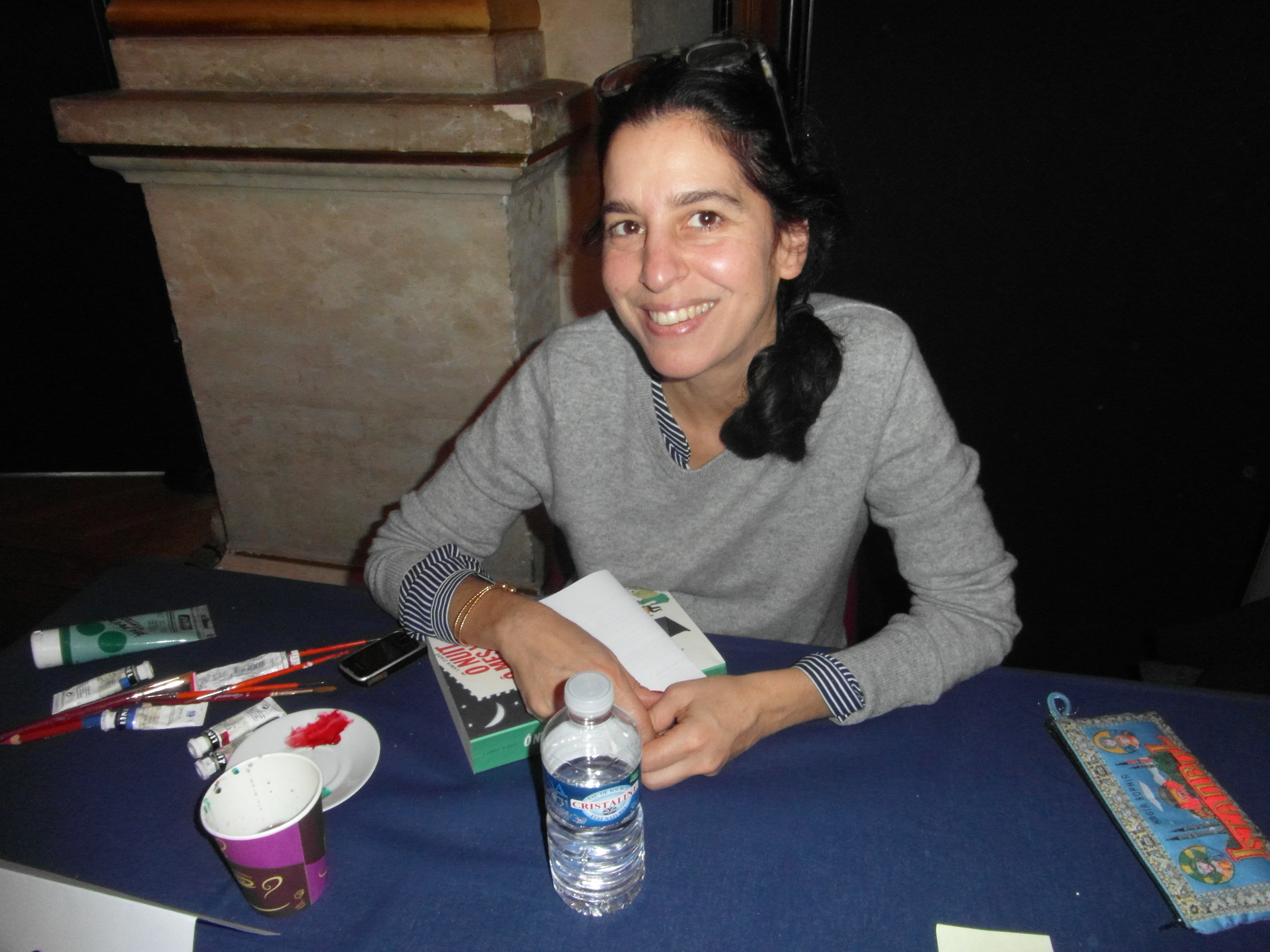
Ziadé, Paris, 2016

Lamia Ziadé (born in Beirut, Lebanon, 1968) is a Lebanese illustrator and visual artist. She grew up in Lebanon then moved to Paris and studied graphic arts at the Atelier Met de Penninghen. She lives and works in Paris.

== Life and work ==
Lamia Ziadé began her career as a fabric designer for luxury brands, including Jean-Paul Gaultier and Issey Miyake. She developed her illustration practice through the publication of books, including children’s books and adult books with sometimes erotic content.

In parallel to her drawings and illustrations, Ziadé began, in 2003, to work on larger scale artworks on erotic and humorous themes, with an esthetic inspired by Pop Art. These mixed media canvases imply a multiplicity of techniques (such as collage and embroidery) and the accumulation of heterogeneous artifacts such as minibar whisky bottles and Air France headrests. In 2008, she exhibited a project entitled Hotel’s War. This installation of wool and fabric childlike models of buildings makes reference to the Battle of the Hotels that took place in the heart of Beirut city in 1975–1976 years.

Trauma and memories from these events, and from the Lebanese Civil War in general pushed Lamia Ziadé to publish Bye Bye Babylon, an autobiographical illustrated novel in which she evokes her personal perception of the transformations that shook her country.

Her 2017 book Ma très grande mélancolie arab was translated into English by Emma Ramadan as My Great Arab Melancholy and published in 2024. A mix of memoir, biography, and history, it traces the lives of Arab intellectuals in the twentieth and twenty-first centuries. It won the James Tait Black Memorial Prize for 2024.

== Publications ==
- Strip tease (Rouergue, 1998)
- Souliax (with Olivier Douzou, Rouergue, 1999)
- Utilisation maximum de la douceur (with Vincent Ravalec; Seuil, 2001
- Dix doigts pour une voix (with Patricia Huet; Seuil, 2002)
- Bye Bye Babylon. Beirut 1975–1979 (Jonathan Cape, 2011)
- Ô nuit, ô mes yeux: Le Caire / Beyrouth / Damas / Jérusalem (P.O.L., 2015)
- Lettres à mon fils, with Fouad Elkoury (Actes Sud, 2016)
- Ma très grande mélancolie arabe (P.O.L., 2017)

== Selected exhibitions ==
=== Solo exhibitions ===
- Lola Cartable, Galerie de l’Entretemps, Paris, 1996
- Je veux que personne ne le sache, Galerie KamelMennour, Paris, 2003
- I’m so glad you found me, Galerie Kamel Mennour, Paris, 2006
- Hotels' War, Galerie Tanit, Munich, 2008
- Time for a Kent, Galerie Benjamin Trigano, Los Angeles, 2008
- Chamade Paris, Galerie Alfa, Paris, 2009
- Smoke, Espace Kettaneh Kunigk, Beirut, 2009

=== Group exhibitions ===
- Girls, girls, girls, CAN, Neuchâtel, 2004
- Sexy Souks, Point Ephémère, Paris, 2007
- Phase Zéro, Galerie Serge Aboukrat, Paris, 2009
- Blitz, Galerie ALFA, Paris, 2010
- Tracés de voyages, If Galerie, Paris, 2010
- All About Beirut, White Box, Munich, 2010
- Rebirth, Lebanon 21st Century Contemporary Art, Beirut Exhibition Art Center, Beirut, 2011
- Subtitled: With Narratives from Lebanon, Royal College of Art, London, 2011
