= Lucien Samaha =

Lebanese-American photographer and artist

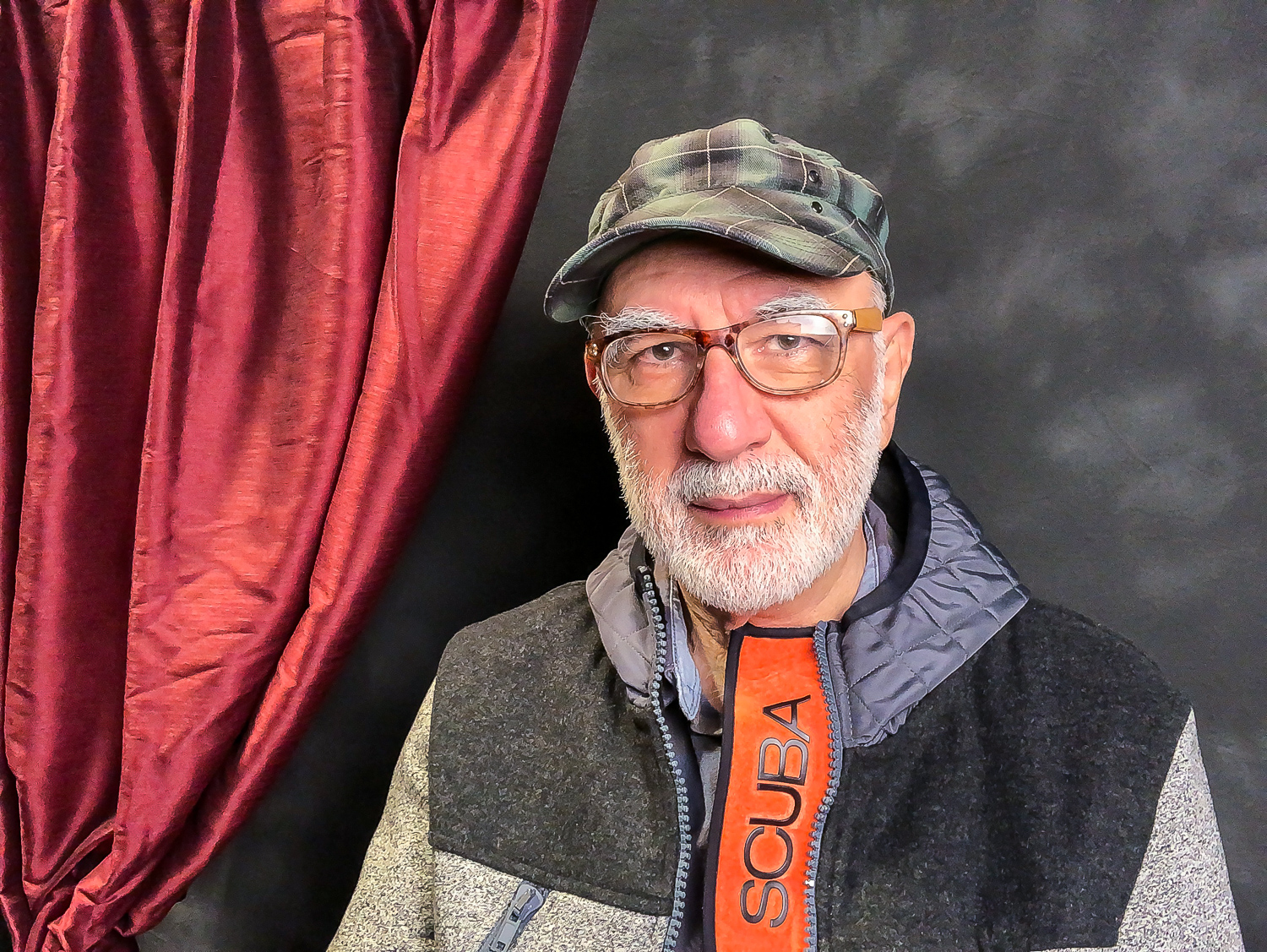
- Born: 1958 (age 67–68); Beirut, Lebanon
- Known for: Photography

Lucien Samaha is a Lebanese-American photographer and artist based in New York City.

== Life and career ==
Samaha was born in Beirut and migrated to the US in 1970. He attended Annandale High School and Rochester Institute of Technology. He was a flight attendant with Trans World Airlines from 1978 to 1986. In 1990, he was the recipient of the first Eastman Kodak Company Professional Photography Division Scholarship ever given to a photographer and later joined the Eastman Kodak Company. He was one of the original members of the Arab Image Foundation.

== Exhibitions ==
=== Solo exhibitions ===
- 2008: Uneasy About Beirut, Sara Tecchia Roma New York, New York, USA
- 2013: The Flight Attendant Years: 1978-1986, Lombard Freid Projects, New York, USA
- 2016: The Actor's Shadow, Sibiu City Hall, Romania
- 2016: The Solitude of Modern Man as Portrayed in Contemporary Cinema, Transilvania International Film Festival, Romania
- 2019: A History of Digital Photography, Pioneer Works, New York, USA

=== Group exhibitions ===
- 2008: Good is What Pleases, Museum für Moderne Kunst, Frankfurt, Germany
- 2006: Persona-Personae, Sara Tecchia Roma New York, New York, USA
- 2006: I Want To Show You Somewhere, Douglas F. Cooley Memorial Art Gallery, Oregon, USA
- 2007: The Searchers, EFA Gallery, New York, USA
- 2018: Beirút, Beyrut, Beyrouth, Beyrout, Oslo Kunstforening, Oslo, Norway
