= Rick Muther =

American racing driver

Rick Muther (August 13, 1935 in Alhambra, California – March 12, 1995) was an American racing driver.

== Biography ==
Muther was for the most part The Indy 500's first hippy race driver. Muther started in SCCA sports car racing in Southern California at Riverside winning the prestigious Tim Mayer award.

Before racing full time, Muther operated heavy construction equipment and drove as a stunt driver for television shows, including The F.B.I. His wife Pat operated a beauty parlor.

In 1964, Muther won the featured E and F Modified Class in the inaugural American Road Race of Champions driving a Lotus 23B and averaging 95.3 miles an hour.

Muther drove in the USAC and CART Championship Car series, racing in the 1967-1975 USAC and 1980 CART seasons, with 46 combined career starts, including the Indianapolis 500 in 1970-1971 and 1974 and finished in the top-ten 13 times.

In the 1971 Indy 500, Muther collided with David Hobbs halfway through the race. Writing for the New York Times, John Radosta noted that "both cars were broken up, but neither driver was hurt."

A highlight of Muther's career was racing for four-time Indy winner A. J. Foyt in the 1975 California 500. Eventually, Foyt hired another teammate, fearing he would be beaten by Muther. Muther's best Indy car finishes were in fifth position in 1968 at Riverside and in 1972 at Milwaukee. He was considered a very capable racing driver and was respected by his peers even though he was not a front-runner.

One of Indy's colorful drivers, Muther often had the wild helmet paint jobs by Gary Finoe, a disciple of Von Dutch. Muther's attire was Kelly Mouse design flying eyeball clothing. He did, however, sport business attire in sponsorship meetings. Muther had many friends in the California music and art scene. A proud "double Leo", he often incorporated Lions in his helmet designs. Muther died of heart failure in his sleep, in San Juan, Washington.

== Complete motorsports results ==
=== American Open-Wheel racing results ===
(key) (Races in bold indicate pole position, races in italics indicate fastest race lap)

==== SCCA National Championship Runoffs ====
Year	Track	Car	Engine	Class	Finish	Start	Status
1964	Riverside	Lotus 23		F Modified	1	12	Running

==== Indy 500 results ====
Year	Chassis	Engine	Start	Finish
1968	Cheetah	Ford	Qualifying Crash	
1969	Gerhardt	Offy	Failed to Qualify	
1970	Brawner Hawk	Offy	15th	8th
1971	Hawk	Offy	18th	21st
1972	Hawk	Offy	Failed to Qualify	
1973	Eagle	Offy	Failed to Qualify	
1974	Coyote	Foyt	24th	27th
1975	Eagle	Offy	Was first alternate getting bumped in the final minute of qualifying.	
1976	Eagle	Offy	Failed to Qualify	
1980	Penske	Cosworth	Very fast in practice Muther spun-out in turn one while qualifying after front roll bar arm snapped off, only to be left in line as qualifying was ended early for rain.	
