= Atelier de Recherche ALBA =

Atelier de Recherche ALBA (Research Workshop ALBA) is a trans-disciplinary structure in the Académie Libanaise des Beaux-Arts ALBA, created and curated by Pierre Hage Boutros, Rana Haddad and Gregory Buchakjian.

== History ==
Atelier de Recherche was founded in 1997 and aimed to deal with urban issues related to the city of Beirut. It initiated numerous projects based on specific places in the city including exhibitions, installations and publications. It seems to have ceased operating after 2005.

== Projects ==
=== The Barakat Building Project (2000) ===
This project was based on the Barakat Building or “Yellow House”, designed in the 1920s by Youssef Aftimus and was located on Beirut’s demarcation line. The project consisted of a large installation based on narratives and testimonies of oral history.

=== The Beirut Theater Project (2001) ===
In 2001, Atelier de Recherche ALBA produced an installation in the "Théâtre de Beyrouth". It consisted of a theater seat place in a vitrine and being cut in two pieces by a mechanical device, thus reminding the work of Gordon Matta Clark. Also based on narratives, the piece was placed in the showcase window, in order to create an interaction with people passing by the street.

=== Pas de Place (No Place) (2002) ===
This project was based on a mapping of Beirut's central district. It resulted in installations, soundtracks and publications, including a comic book Beyrouth Catharsis, by Zeina Abirached.
