= Gregory Buchakjian =

Lebanese photographer, filmmaker and art historian

Gregory Buchakjian (born 1971, in Beirut, Lebanon) is a Lebanese photographer, filmmaker and art historian. He studied at the Paris-Sorbonne University. He is the director of the School of Visual Arts at Académie Libanaise des Beaux-Arts ALBA and was co founder, with architects Pierre Hage Boutros and Rana Haddad, of Atelier de Recherche ALBA.

From 2012 to 2019, Buchakjian has been a member of the advisory committee of the Saradar Collection, devoted to Lebanese art from the contemporary and modern periods.

== Work ==
Buchakjian emerged in the art scene after the 2006 Lebanon War within a collective of Lebanese filmmakers. He directed What Shoes, a short animation film presented as part of the Videos Under Siege project featured in the Dubai International Film Festival 2008.

In the following years, he slipped into Beirut's vibrant and underground nightlife. His photographs depict sensuality although violence and anxiety remain hidden. Taking its name "Nighthawks" from a famous painting by Edward Hopper, the project was exhibited in Der Aa-kerk, Groningen as part of the 18th Noorderlicht Photofestival 2011: Metropolis. In the aftermath, Buchakjian produced a scholarly study on the history of nightlife photography in Lebanon.

Buchakjian was part of The Place that Remains, the first national Pavilion of Lebanon curated by Hala Younes at the 2018 Venice Biennale of Architecture.

After the eruption of the 2019–2020 Lebanese protests, he collected screenshots of photographs, videos, drawings and texts published on social media. The first 480 in order of appearance were gathered in the work Thawra Stories followed by the list of the Instagram accounts where they were released.

=== Abandoned dwellings ===
From 2009 to 2016, Buchakjian constituted a long-term research and exploration devoted to abandoned dwellings in Beirut that involved a PhD dissertation. In this context, he collaborated with Said Baalbaki on a lithography artist book based on Wadi Abu Jamil, the former Jewish Quarter of Beirut, where Baalbaki grew up, that was witnessed dramatic transformations during the war and postwar periods. He also exhibited, in dialogue with François Sargologo, photographic ruins extracted from a building that was allegedly inhabited by a member of the General Command of "Al Assifa" forces within the Palestine Liberation Organization.

The artistic project was disclosed in 2018 with an exhibition curated by Karina El Helou at Beirut's Sursock Museum. It included staged photographs of human figures wandering in the ruins, an apparatus displaying data sheets for 700 buildings and a video in which Buchakjian and Valerie Cachard manipulate, examine and read extracts from hundreds of documents they collected during their visits. In the second installment at Brussel's Villa Empain, one entire room was exclusively about the house of former prime minister Takieddin el-Solh, with drawings made after objects found on the grounds and two pictures of the same space, one by Buchakjian and one taken in 1984 by Fouad Elkoury.

== Publications ==
- Halte (Labor et Fides, Geneva, 2006)
- Pièces choisies, collection Bank Audi (Bank Audi, Beirut, 2008)
- Esteban Lisa in the land of the Cedars. Tradition and Abstraction (Fundación Esteban Lisa, Buenos Aires and Fundación Antonio Pérez, Disputación de Cuenca, 2010)
- De lumière et de sang (Alarm Editions, Beirut, 2010)
- Art is the answer! Contemporary Lebanese artists and designers (Villa Empain, Brussels, 2012)
- War and other Impossible Possibilities. Thoughts on Arab History and Contemporary Art (Alarm Editions, Beirut, 2012)
- Michel Basbous (Beirut Exhibition Center, Beirut, 2014)
- Passing Time. With Fouad Elkoury and Manal Khader (Kaph Books, Beirut, 2017)
- Abandoned Dwellings. A History of Beirut, edited by Valerie Cachard (Kaph Books, Beirut, 2018)

== Selected exhibitions ==
=== Solo exhibitions ===
- Nighthawks, Comme des Garçons Guerilla Store, Beirut, 2008
- Abandoned Dwellings, Display of Systems, curated by Karina El Helou, Sursock Museum, Beirut, 2018
- Abandoned Dwellings of Beirut, Villa Empain, Brussels, 2019

=== Group exhibitions ===
- Nafas Beirut, Espace SD, Beirut, 2006
- De Lumière et de Sang, Foundation Audi, Beirut, 2010
- Q Calling the Shots – vol. 1: Architectural Photography, Q Contemporary, Beirut, 2010
- Q Calling the Shots – vol. 2: Narrative Photography, Q Contemporary, Beirut, 2011
- Metropolis. City Life in the Urban Age, Noorderlicht Photofestival 2011, Groningen, 2011
- Platform: The Year in Images, National Museum of Singapore, 2012
- Pellicula, Galerie Janine Rubeiz, Beirut, 2013
- The Place that Remains, Lebanese Pavilion, 16th Venice Biennale of Architecture, 2018
- Across Boundaries. Focus on Lebanese Photography, curated by Tarek Nahas, Beirut Art Fair 2018
- Beyond. Contemporary Lebanese Art and Design, Phillips (auctioneers), London 2019
- Beirut Lab: 1975(2020) Curated by Juli Carson and Yassmeen Tukan, University Art Gallery, University of California, Irvine, 2019
