= Gabriele Basilico =

Italian photographer (1944–2013)

- Basilico in 2012
- Born: 12 August 1944; Milan, Italy
- Died: 13 February 2013 (aged 68); Milan, Italy
- Occupation: Photographer

Gabriele Basilico (12 August 1944 – 13 February 2013) was an Italian photographer who defined himself as "a measurer of space".

== Life and career ==
Born in Milan, Basilico originally studied to become an architect before pursuing a career in photography. His initial works focused around reportage, but he later shifted his focus to architectural photography due to the influence of his previous studies in architecture, and influenced by the work of Hilla and Bernd Becher. He was interested in landscape photography and, especially, in the representation of the city. He achieved international fame in 1982 with his photographic report on the industrial areas of Milan, "Milano. Ritratti di fabbriche".

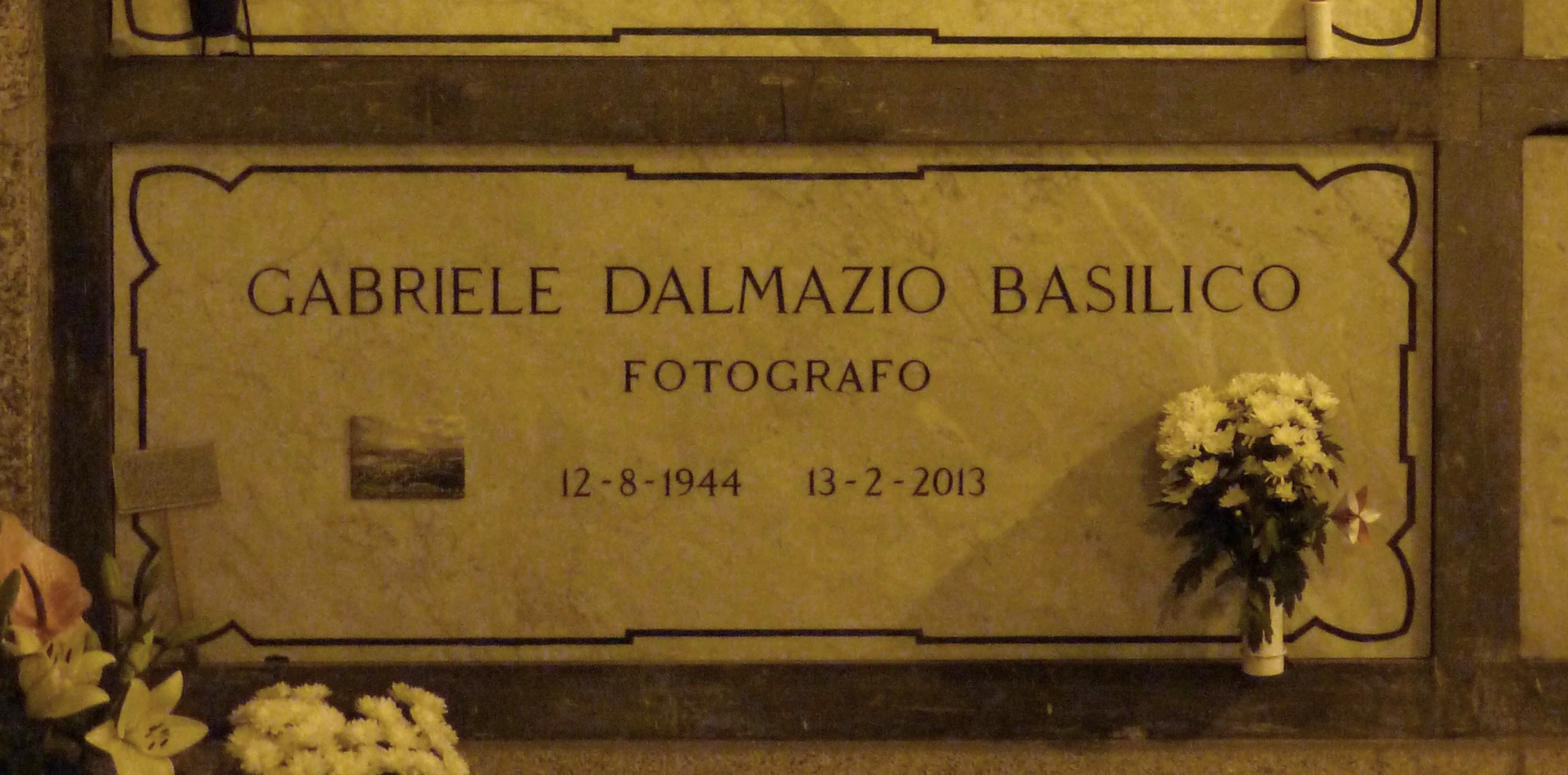
Basilico's grave at the Monumental Cemetery of Milan in 2015

In the mid-1980s he was part of a group of photographers commissioned by the French Government (DATAR) to document the transformation of the Transalpine landscape.

In 1991 his photographs helped to document the effects of war on the Lebanese capital of Beirut with his celebrated work, "Beirut 1991".

He was invited at Biennale di Venezia in 1996 with the exposition Sezioni del paesaggio italiano/Italy. Cross Sections of a Country, in collaboration with Stefano Boeri. He received the prize “Osella d'oro” for contemporary architectural photography. In 1999 he published Interrupted City and Cityscapes, with beyond 300 pictures of cities, realised from the '80. Starting from this book he selected a photographic series exposed at Stedelijk Museum in Amsterdam, CPF (Centro Portugues de Fotografia) in Porto, MART (Museo d'Arte Moderna di Trento e Rovereto) in Trento, and at MAMBA (Museo de Arte Moderno) in Buenos Aires. In 2000 he worked in the metropolitan area of Berlin, invited by DAAD (Deutscher Akademischer Austausch Dienst). He received the prize “I.N.U.” (Istituto Nazionale di Urbanistica) due to his contribution to the documentation of the contemporary urban space.

His last public work was showcased in December 2012, at the inauguration of a new square, Piazza Gae Aulenti, in Milan. The work consisted of a series of photographs that portrayed the Porta Nuova Project from its inception through completion.

The majority of Basilico's work was done using a traditional viewfinder camera and black-and-white film. He was awarded the Osella d'Oro at the 1996 Venice Biennale.

== Publications ==
- Milano. Ambiente urbano (IGIS edizioni, 1978)
- Gabriele Basilico, Dancing in Emilia (Priuli & Verlucca, 1980)
- Milano. Ritratti di fabbriche (Sugarco edizioni, 1981) ISBN 9788871796277
- Italia & France, Vedute 1978-1985 (Jaca Book, 1986) ISBN 8816640103
- Vedute (Arles: Incontri di Fotografia, 1987)
- Trasimeno – Percorsi e Visioni (Silvana Editoriale, 1987)
- IL PARCO DI MIGLIARINO SAN ROSSORE MASSACIUCCOLI (Regione Toscana, 1988) ISBN 8831751166
- Esplorazioni di fabbriche (Mondadori Electa, 1989) ISBN 88-435-2801-7
- Porti di mare (Art&, 1990) ISBN 9788885893207
- Bord de Mer (Art&, 1992)
- Beirut (Art&, 1994) ISBN 978-8860734297
- L’esperienza dei Luoghi (Art&, 1997)
- Monza: paesaggi interiori (Silvana Editoriale, 1999) ISBN 88-8215-162-X
- Bord de Mer (Baldini&Castoldi, 2003) ISBN 8495952475
- Scattered City (Le Point du Jour, 2007) ISBN 8842420484
- Architetture, città, visioni (Bruno Mondadori, 2007) ISBN 8842420484
- Mosca verticale. (Federico Motta, 2008) ISBN 887179589X
- Beirut 1991 (2003) – Gabriele Basilico (Baldini Castoldi Dalai, 2008) ISBN 978-8884903815
- Bord de Mer, Inediti 1984-1985 (VerbaVolant, 2011)
- Leggere le fotografie in dodici lezioni (Rizzoli, 2012) ISBN 9788817056908
- Bord de mer (Contrasto, 2012) ISBN 9788869657153
- Dancing in Emilia. Gabriele Basilico (Silvana Editoriale, 2013) ISBN 9788836627622
- Gabriele Basilico. Iran 1970 (Humboldt Books, 2015) ISBN 9788890841873
- Matosinhos. Non c’è architettura senza luce (Corsiero editore, 2017) ISBN 978-88-98420-62-9
- Entropy and Urban Space (La Fabrica, 2018) ISBN 978-84-17048-06-8
- Gabriele Basilico. Metropoli. (Skira, 2020) ISBN 9788857243153
- Territori intermedi (Skira, 2021) ISBN 9788857246161
- non recensiti (Humboldt Books, 2021) ISBN 9788899385866
