= Thomas Jefferson High School (1964–1987) =

Coordinates: 38°49′05.37″N 77°10′06.48″W

Location
- 6560 Braddock Rd. Alexandria, Virginia 22312; United States

Information
- School type: Public, high school
- Founded: 1964
- Closed: 1987
- School district: Fairfax County Public Schools
- Grades: 9–12
- Language: English
- Campus type: Suburban
- Mascot: Colonials

Thomas Jefferson High School was a public high school in Fairfax County, Virginia, United States; it had an Alexandria mailing address but was outside of the Alexandria city limits. A part of the Fairfax County Public Schools, it opened in 1964 and closed in 1987.

The school was co-located with the Thomas Jefferson High School for Science and Technology from 1985 to 1987. It stopped accepting new students after 1985, and merged with Annandale High School for the 1987–1988 school year. No students from Jefferson or TJHSST graduated in 1988. Students who had attended TJ from 1984 to 1987 graduated from Annandale HS in 1988.

== Notable alumni ==
- Vincent K. Brooks, United States Army general
- Dave Grohl, drummer, Scream, Nirvana, and Them Crooked Vultures, and lead singer and guitarist, Foo Fighters
- Alisa Harvey, middle-distance runner
- Aaron Hillegass, computer programmer, author, trainer, and founder of Big Nerd Ranch
- Scott Norwood, former NFL kicker of the Buffalo Bills
- Jay Raymond, first United States Chief of Space Operations
