= Patricia Mernone =

American automobile racer and organic chemist (born 1940)

- Born: 1940 (age 85–86)
- Other names: Pat Mernone, Pat Young (after marriage)
- Occupations: Automobile racer, organic chemist
- Years active: 1960s

Patricia Ann Lynn Mernone (born 1940) was an American automobile racer and organic chemist. In 1964, she became the first American woman driver to compete for a national racing title, when she drove in the first American Road Race of Champions. Her portrait, portrayed by Norman Rockwell, is displayed in the National Portrait Gallery in Washington D.C.

== Early life ==
Mernone was the daughter of Edward Mernone Jr. and Mattie Powell Mernone. She was from Falls Church, Virginia, and attended nearby Annandale High School. Her father was a rally driver and race track owner, and he encouraged her to learn how to drive racing cars at Carroll Shelby's school. She was a graduate student in chemistry at American University during her racing career.

== Career ==
Mernone began driving competitively in 1961, in Sports Car Club of America events. She worked with tuner and driver Peter van der Vate from 1962 to 1964, sharing the wheel of an Austin-Healey Sebring Sprite. Together the pair won the Class G Production category in 1963. In 1963 she was also part of an "all-girl team" with Donna Mae Mims, driving a Renault Dauphine at Marlboro in Maryland.

Mernone was the points leader that summer in the Class G Production category, and "the only woman driver of 200" entries in an event at Thompson Raceway in Connecticut, where she drove a Morgan tuned by van der Vate. On the basis of her regional wins in the Class H Production category in 1964, Mernone was invited to compete in the first American Road Race of Champions in Riverside, California, making her the first American woman driver to compete for a national racing title.

In 1964 and 1965, Mernone and teammate Marianne "Pinkie" Rollo drove a Peugeot 404 together at several events. She raced her Morgan again in 1965, and won an event at Virginia International Raceway. In 1966, she competed in a Formula Vee race in New Jersey. She was an editorial assistant for the American Chemical Society when she raced a Porsche 911 at Virginia International Raceway in 1967. In 1969, Mernone was the subject of a portrait drawing by painter Norman Rockwell, now in the collection of the National Portrait Gallery.

== Personal life ==
Mernone married a fellow racing driver, Bill Young, who was also her father's business partner. Patricia Young was alive and living in Canyon Lake, California, in 2002, when her stepfather Charles M. Kugel died.
