= Noorderlicht =

- Stichting Fotografie Noorderlicht
- Established: 1980
- Location: Groningen, Netherlands
- Type: Photography
- Director: Roosje Klap
- Website: www.noorderlicht.com

Noorderlicht (Dutch for "Northern Light") is an international platform for photography and lens-based media based in Groningen, The Netherlands. In addition to the Noorderlicht Biennale, Noorderlicht organizes exhibitions, an educational program, a publishing house, and its own print lab.

== History ==
Noorderlicht photogallery was founded in 1980. Ten years later, the photofestival was launched, becoming one of the most important international photographic events. In 1991, the festival became a biennale, until 2000, when it was restored as an annual event. From this date, the festival site has alternated between Groningen and Friesland. Since 2021, Noorderlicht has been a biennial for photography and lens-based media in the three Northern provinces of the Netherlands. Ton Broekhuis, co-founder of Noorderlicht, served as director until 2016. Kees van der Meiden succeeded him. Since 2024, Roosje Roosje Klap has been the general and artistic director of Noorderlicht.

== Photofestivals ==
List of Noorderlicht Festivals (1990–2025)

- 1990 – Groningen: Noorderlicht I
- 1991 – Groningen: Noorderlicht II
- 1993 – Groningen: Home
- 1995 – Groningen: Common Lives
- 1997 – Groningen: The Garden of Eden – Imagining a Dynamic Reality
- 1999 – Groningen: Wonderland – The Boundaries of Documentary Photography
- 2000 – Friesland, Leeuwarden: Africa Inside – Photography from Africa
- 2001 – Groningen: Sense of Space – The Human Experience of Space
- 2002 – Friesland, Leeuwarden: Mundos Creados – Photography from Latin America
- 2003 – Groningen: Global Detail – The Effects of Globalization
- 2004 – Friesland, Leeuwarden: Nazar – Photography from the Arab World
- 2005 – Groningen: Traces & Omens – On the Passage of Time
- 2006 – Friesland, Leeuwarden: Another Asia – Photography from South and Southeast Asia
- 2007 – Groningen: Act of Faith – On Belief and Conflict, Ecstasy and Excess
- 2008 – Friesland, Leeuwarden: Behind Walls – Eastern Europe Before 1989
- 2009 – Groningen: Human Conditions – Six Curators Share Their Personal Views
- 2010 – Friesland, Leeuwarden: Land – Country Life in the Urban Age (Part 1 of the Urbanization Diptych)
- 2011 – Groningen: Metropolis – City Life in the Urban Age (Part 2 of the Urbanization Diptych)
- 2012 – Friesland, Leeuwarden: Terra Cognita – The Relationship Between Humans and Nature
- 2013 – Groningen: TWENTY – Celebrating Twenty Editions of Noorderlicht
- 2014 – Friesland, Heerenveen: An Ocean of Possibilities – Human Resilience in Times of Crisis
- 2015 – Groningen: Data Rush – Tension Between Freedom and Control in a Virtual World
- 2016 – Friesland, Heerenveen: Arena – Visible and Invisible Traces of Humans in the Landscape
- 2017 – Groningen: Nucleus – On Art and Science
- 2018 – Friesland, Heerenveen: In Vivo – The Ambivalent Relationship Between Humans and Nature
- 2019 – Groningen: Taxed to the Max – The Influence of Global Corporations on Everyday Life
- 2020 – Heerenveen & Groningen: Generation Z – The Worldview of the Post-1996 Generation
- 2021 – Friesland, Groningen & Drenthe: The Makeable Mind – How Today’s Image Makers Shape Our Perception of the World
- 2023 – Friesland, Groningen & Drenthe: Regenerate – Restoring and Renewing Human and Natural Relationships
- 2025 – Friesland, Groningen & Drenthe: Machine Entanglements – The Interrelationship of Technology and Ecology
