= Cooper T49 =

Sports racing car

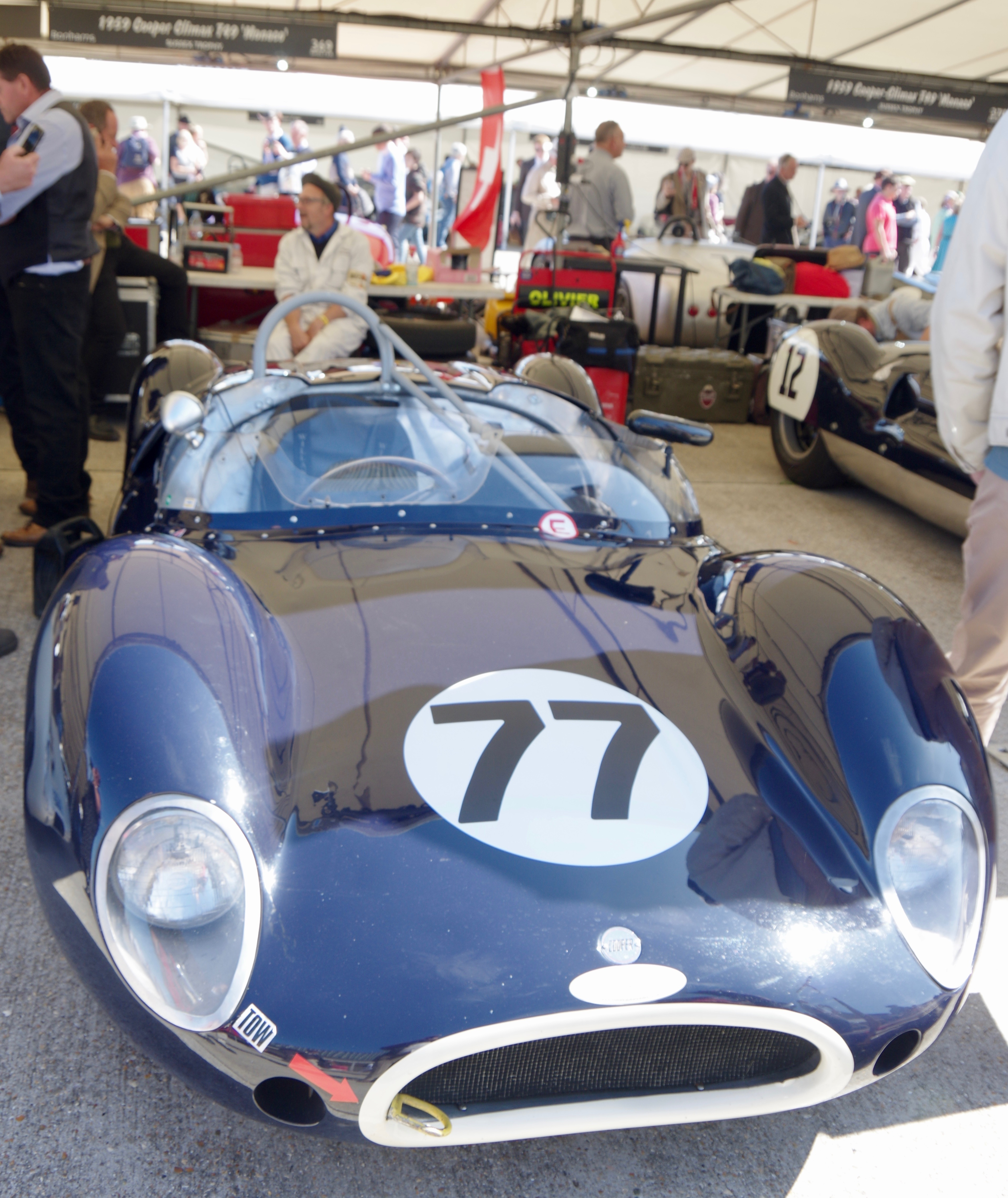
1959 Cooper T49 Monaco

The Cooper T49 (Type 49), also known as the Cooper Monaco T49, or the Cooper T49 Monaco, is a lightweight sports racing car, designed, developed and built by the British manufacturer Cooper, in 1959. It was manufactured as the successor to the Cooper T39 (more commonly known as the 'Bobtail'). It competed in motor racing between 1959 and 1966, and was extremely successful, as well as being very competitive. It won 89 races (plus an additional 16 class wins), scored 136 podium finishes, and clinched 11 pole positions. It was powered by a Coventry Climax four-cylinder engine of varying displacements; those being 1,098 cc (67.0 cu in), 1,450 cc (88 cu in), and 2,000 cc (120 cu in).
