= Fouad Elkoury =

Lebanese photographer and filmmaker

Fouad Elkoury (Arabic: فؤاد الخوري; born 1952) is a Lebanese photographer and filmmaker. He is known for his photographs of war in Lebanon.

== Life and work ==
ElKoury was born in Paris, the son of Lebanese architect Pierre el-Khoury. He studied architecture in London before switching to photography.

He began photographing daily life during the Lebanese Civil War. He documented the 1982 Israeli invasion of Lebanon and found himself on the Atlantis, the ship aboard of which Yasser Arafat had been evacuated, producing an unexpected nautical photo essay.

In 1989, ElKoury joined Rapho agency and spent one year in Egypt.

In 1991, he was part of a collective photographic project in charge of capturing an ultimate image of Beirut city center's ruins, with Robert Frank, Raymond Depardon, René Burri, Josef Koudelka and Gabriele Basilico.

ElKoury is one of the co-founders of the Arab Image Foundation a non-profit organization whose mission is to collect, preserve and study photographs from the Middle East, North Africa and the Arab diaspora.

In 2002, ElKoury was commissioned to produce a body of work to be exhibited at the Maison européenne de la photographie as Sombres. He represented Lebanon in the 52nd Venice Biennale in 2007 with the series "On War and Love", 2006. In 2011, he exhibited Be…longing in a solo show at the Beirut Art Center. Elkoury participated in Roundtable: The 9th Gwangju Biennale, from September to November 2012 in Gwangju, Korea. In 2016, he exhibited the video installation Le plus beau jour [The Greatest Day] at Bildmuseet, Umeå University, Sweden, from June to September 2016.

== Filmography ==
- Jours tranquiles en Palestine (1998)
- The Wandering Myth (2001)
- Lettres à Francine (2002)
- Moving Out (2004)
- Welcome to Beirut (2005)

== Publications ==
- Beyrouth aller-retour (l’Etoile, 1984)
- Palestine – L’envers du miroir (Hazan, 1996)
- Liban Provisoire (Hazan, 1998)
- Suite Egyptienne (Actes Sud, 1999)
- Sombres (Marval, 2002)
- La sagesse du photographe (l’œil neuf, 2004)
- On war and love (Intervalles, 2007)
- What happened to my dreams? (Espace Kettaneh-Kunigk 2010)
- Be ... Longing (Steidl, 2011)
- Lettres à mon fils, with Lamia Ziadé (Actes Sud, 2016)
- Passing Time, With Gregory Buchakjian and Manal Khader (Kaph Books, Beirut, 2017)
- Cinéma Cairo Palace: A Journey Into Egyptian Cinéma (1985-1996) (Kaph Books, 2024)

== Awards ==
- Prix Medicis Hors les murs (1989)
- World Press Photo, Honorable mention, General News stories (1995)
