= George Nolen =

American business executive (born 1956)

George C. Nolen (born May 31, 1956) is an American business executive who was CEO of Siemens Corporation from 2004 to 2009.

In 2010 Nolen became senior managing director at Madison Industries and is president, CEO and chairman of Filtration Group, Madison Industries' largest portfolio company. International Filtration News describes Filtration Group as "the fastest-growing global filtration pure-play".

== Early life and education ==
Nolen grew up in Annandale, Virginia as one of seven children. He attended St Michaels Catholic School and graduated from Annandale High School in 1974. He graduated from Virginia Tech in 1978 a Bachelor of Science in Business. He has attended advanced management courses at Babson College and Duke University.

== Career ==
Nolen started with Silicon Valley start-up ROLM Communication in 1982. In 1986, ROLM was sold to IBM, where Nolen went to become Director of Telecommunications Products and Software. Nolen moved over to Siemens in 1992, when IBM sold its telecommunication portfolio to Siemens. Nolen became CEO of Siemens Corporation, the US arm of Siemens AG in 2004. He spent 26 years in various executive roles at Siemens prior to his retirement in 2009.

Nolen was CEO of Filtration Group Corporation from 2017 to 2019. In addition to his role at Filtration Group he was Senior Managing Director at Madison Industries since 2010.

In 2005, Governor Mark Warner of Virginia appointed Nolen to the Virginia Tech Board of Visitors. He became Rector of the board from 2010-2012. He led the Presidential Search committee selecting Dr Timothy Sands to be the 16th President of Virginia Tech.
