= Bzebdine =

Bzebdine بزبدين
- Coordinates: 33.8716°N 35.7310°E
- Country: Lebanon
- Governorate: Mount Lebanon
- District: Baabda District

Bzebdine (Arabic: بزبدين) is a municipality in Baabda District, Mount Lebanon Governorate, Lebanon.
