= Marcel Duchamp Prize =

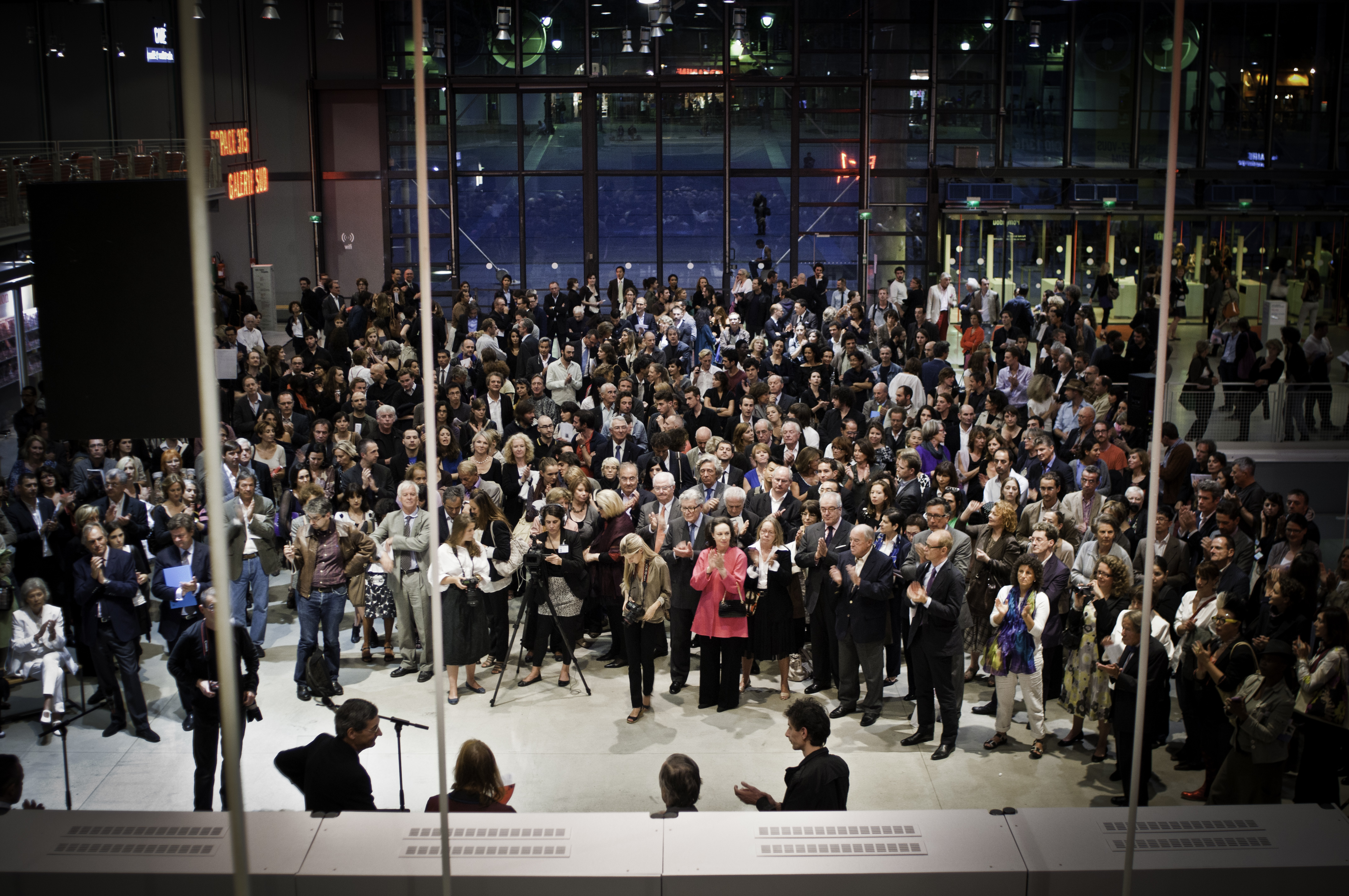
Prix Marcel Duchamp 2009 in Centre Georges Pompidou

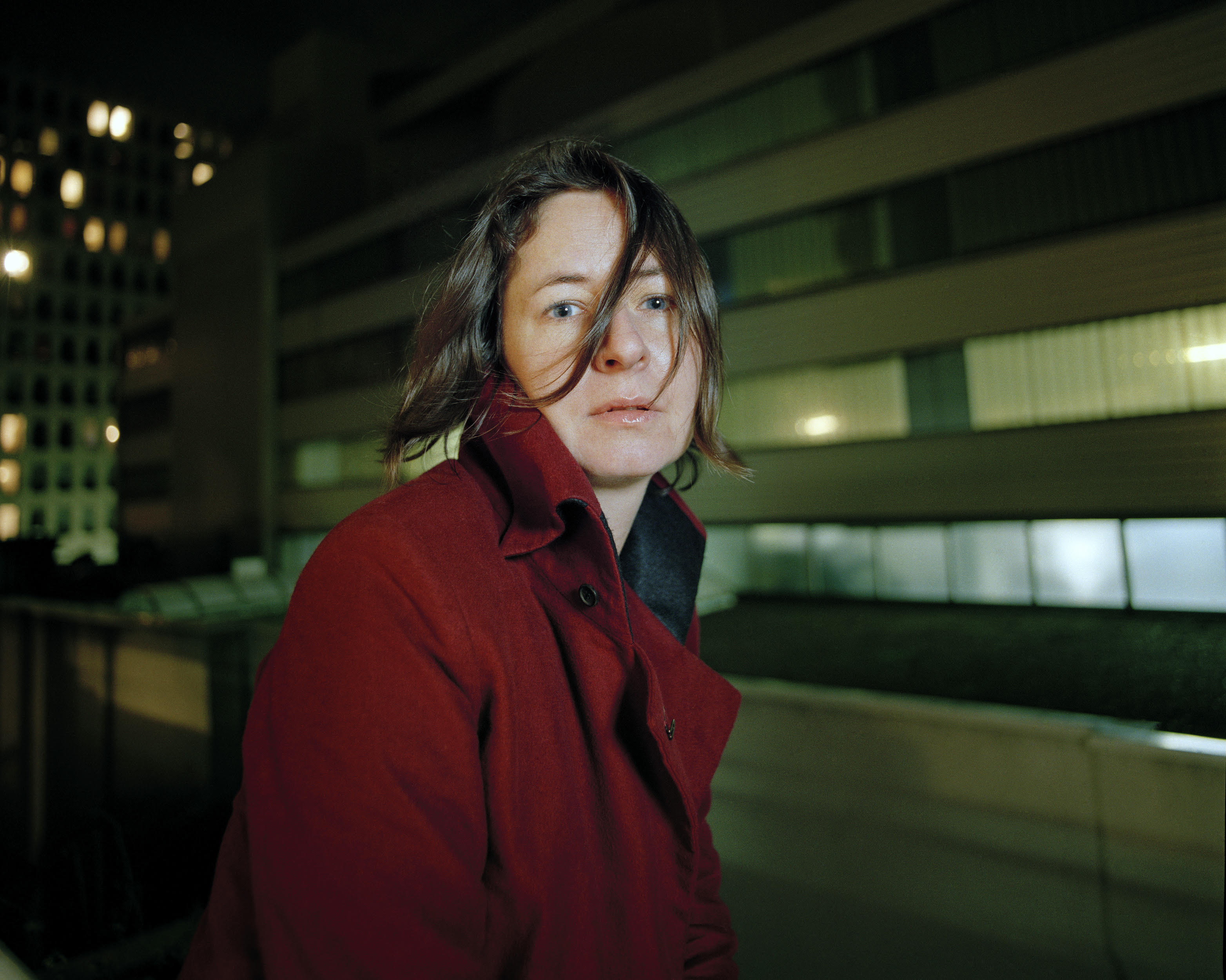
Winner of the year 2002: Dominique Gonzalez-Foerster

The Marcel Duchamp Prize (in French : Prix Marcel Duchamp) is an annual award given to a young artist by the Association pour la Diffusion Internationale de l'Art Français (ADIAF).

The winner receives €35,000 personally and up to €30,000 in order to produce an exhibition of their work in the Modern Art museum (Centre Georges Pompidou).

The prize is named after the artist Marcel Duchamp.

== History of the Marcel-Duchamp Prize ==
In the early 1990s, an association was created, the ADIAF (Association for the international dissemination of French art), notably by Gilles Fuchs, international lawyer but also art collector, and by the gallery owner Daniel Templon, to participate in better promotion and distribution of the works of French visual artists. Launched by a group of five people, the ADIAF has nearly 400 members in 2020. You become a member by cooptation: you have to be a collector (but this criterion includes exceptions, in particular some gallery owners, brokers and art restorers) and be interested in the French art scene.

== Prize winners ==
Year	Winner	Other nominees
2001	Thomas Hirschhorn	Pierre Bismuth, Rebecca Bournigault, Claude Closky, Felice Varini, Xavier Veilhan
2002	Dominique Gonzalez-Foerster	Anri Sala, Bernard Frize, Valérie Jouve, Wang Du
2003	Mathieu Mercier	Stéphane Couturier, Claude Lévêque, Pascal Pinaud, Eric Poitevin
2004	Carole Benzaken	Valérie Belin, Philippe Cognée, Richard Fauguet, Philippe Ramette
2005	Claude Closky	Kader Attia, Gilles Barbier, Olivier Blanckart
2006	Philippe Mayaux	Abdel Abdessemed, Leandro Erlich, Bruno Peinado
2007	Tatiana Trouvé	Adam Adach, Pierre Ardouvin, Richard Fauguet
2008	Laurent Grasso	Michel Blazy, Stéphane Calais, Didier Marcel
2009	Saâdane Afif	Damien Deroubaix, Nicolas Moulin, Philippe Perrot
2010	Cyprien Gaillard	Céleste Boursier-Mougenot, Camille Henrot, Anne-Marie Schneider
2011	Mircea Cantor	Damien Cabanes, Guillaume Leblon, Samuel Rousseau
2012	Daniel Dewar et Grégory Gicquel- sculpture	Valérie Favre, Bertrand Lamarche, Franck Scurti
2013	Latifa Echakhch	Farah Atassi, Claire Fontaine, Raphaël Zarka
2014	Julien Prévieux	Evariste Richer, Théo Mercier, Florian et Michaël Quistrebert
2015	Melik Ohanian	Davide Balula, Neïl Beloufa, Zineb Sedira
2016	Kader Attia	Yto Barrada, Ulla von Brandenburg, Barthélémy Toguo
2017	Joana Hadjithomas and Khalil Joreige	Maja Bajevic, Charlotte Moth, Vittorio Santoro
2018	Clément Cogitore	Mohamed Bourouissa, Thu Van Tran, Marie Voignier
2019	Éric Baudelaire	Katinka Bock, Marguerite Humeau, Ida Tursic & Wilfried Mille
2020	Kapwani Kiwanga	Alice Anderson, Hicham Berrada, Enrique Ramirez
2021	Lili Reynaud-Dewar	Isabelle Cornaro, Julian Charrière, Julien Creuzet
2022	Mimosa Echard	Giulia Andreani, Iván Argote, Philippe Decrauzat
2023	Tarik Kiswanson	Bertille Bak, Bouchra Khalili, Massinissa Selmani
2024	Gaëlle Choisne	Abdelkader Benchamma, Angela Detanico and Rafael Lain, Noémie Goudal
2025	Xie Lei	Bianca Bondi, Eva Nielsen, Lionel Sabatté
2026	David Brognon and Stéphanie Rollin	Joël Andrianomearisoa, Josèfa Ntjam and Laura Henno

== See also ==
- List of European art awards
