= Samuel Rousseau =

Samuel Rousseau may refer to:

- Samuel Rousseau (orientalist), British Oriental scholar and printer
- Samuel Rousseau (composer), French composer
- Samuel Rousseau (artist), French artist
