= Mimosa Echard =

French artist

Mimosa Echard is a French visual artist who lives and works in Paris.

== Biography ==
Echard was born in 1986 in Alès, France. She grew up with her sisters in a hippie community in the Cévennes. She studied at the École nationale supérieure des arts décoratifs in Paris, from which she graduated in 2010.

In 2019, she was a resident at Villa Kujoyama in Kyoto. Since 2021, she has been the head of a multimedia workshop at the Beaux-Arts de Paris.

Echard is the winner of the 2022 edition of the Marcel Duchamp Prize.

She is represented by the galleries Chantal Crousel (Paris) and Martina Simeti (Milan).

== Work ==
Echard's artistic research explores the boundaries between nature and pop culture. Thanks to a multidisciplinary practice that ranges from painting, to sculpture, to video and digital, she creates fictional worlds with psychedelic traits through the accumulation and assemblage of objects, images as well as botanical references from the Cévennes (her native region), a region with a long history of counter-cultural and community experiments initiated in the 1970s.

Collaboration is important in reading her work: ”Collaborations are always a way of creating collective events and experiences outside of the validation system of art and institutions”. One example is the "open-source experimental exploration game" proposed by Echard as part of her exhibition at Palais de Tokyo in 2022, accessible only online. Designed in collaboration with a software developer, musicians and actors, the “scenario imagines an engaging and humorous approach to interspecies relations”.

Her work has been the subject of several solo exhibitions, including Sporal, at Palais de Tokyo in 2022, or Sluggy Me at the Collection Lambert, in Avignon in 2021, but also in various galleries including the Samy Abraham gallery in Paris

== Solo exhibitions (selection) ==
- 2010: Pour changer de forme, diploma, École nationale supérieure des arts décoratifs, Paris
- 2012: Booster, Modules Pierre-Bergé – Yves-Saint-Laurent Foundation, curated by Daria de Beauvais, Palais de Tokyo, Paris
- 2012: Oiseau / hasard, Bernard-Anthonioz Art House, Nogent-sur-Marne
- 2014: Destroy the Image and You Will Break the Enemy, Project room, Chez Valentin Gallery, Paris
- 2015: Asterico Mariposa, Fire Place, Barcelona
- 2015: Dead is the New Life, Le Plateau (center of contemporary art) / Frac, Île-de-France
- 2015: Mithril, with Jonathan Martin, Circonstance Gallery, Nice
- 2015: Une robe profonde d'empathie, with Jean-Marie Perdrix, Samy Abraham Gallery, Paris
- 2016: iDeath, Samy Abraham Gallery, Paris
- 2017: Friends, Samy Abraham Gallery, Paris
- 2017: Pulsion Potion, Cell Project Space Gallery, London
- 2018: Mauve Dose, Maternity Ward of the Geneva HUG, Geneva
- 2019: Pulpe, with Shanta Rao, curated by Raphaël Brunet, Ecole municipale des beaux-arts, Édouard-Manet Gallery, Gennevilliers
- 2019: Luca, with Michel Blazy, Dortmunder Kunstverein, Dortmund
- 2019: Cracher une image de toi/ Spitting an image of you, with Ryan Foerster and Hannah Buonaguro, VNH Gallery, Paris
- 2020 Un bout de toi, Salomon, Martina Simeti, Milan, Italy
- 2021 Numbs, Chantal Crousel Gallery, Paris, France
- 2021 Sluggy Me, Lambert Collection, Avignon, France
- 2022 Sporal, Palais de Tokyo, Paris, France

== Awards and selections ==
- 2015 Finalist, Le Meurice Prize for Contemporary Art, Paris, France
- 2018 Finalist, BFSP Sculpture Prize, Fonderia Artistica Battaglia, Milan, Italy
- 2021 Acquisition of the Marval Collection Fund, Italy
- 2021 Ettore and Ines Fico Prize, Turin, Italy
- 2022: Marcel Duchamp Prize, Centre Georges-Pompidou, Paris

== Residencies ==
- 2011: Thailywood artist residency, Chonburi (Thailand)
- 2014 Lafayette Anticipations, Corporate Foundation of the Lafayette Galleries, Paris, France
- 2014: Villa Arson, Nice
- 2014/15: Cité internationale des arts, Paris
- 2019: Villa Kujoyama, Kyoto
- 2022 Villa Albertine, Miami, US

== Collections ==
Her works are part of public and private collections including: the Pompidou Center, the Louis Vuitton Foundation, the Paris Museum of Modern Art, the National Centre of Plastic Arts in Paris, the Corporate Foundation of the Lafayette Galleries in France, the Ettore Fico Museum in Turin, Italy; and the Samdani Art Foundation, in Dhaka, Bangladesh

== Notes and references ==
=== Bibliography ===
- Daria de Beauvais and Frédéric Grossi (eds.) (texts by Pip Wallis, Mimosa Echard, Daria de Beauvais), Sporal, Les Presses du réel, 2022 (French/English) ISBN 978-2-37896-320-0

=== Press ===
- Matthieu Jacquet, "Dans l'incroyable atelier de Mimosa Echard, l’enchanteresse qui transforme l'art et la nature", Numéro, 9 April 2021
- Lise Guéhenneux, "Mimosa Echard", Crash Magazine, Edition 93, March 2021, p. 60–71
- Charles Aubin, "Horn of Plenty: Mimosa Echard", Mousse Magazine, October 2020
- Roxana Azimi, "Jeune pousse. Mimosa Echard, naturel butineur”, Le Monde, January 2017

=== External links ===
- Sporal video game website
