= Cité internationale des arts =

French nonprofit center for artists

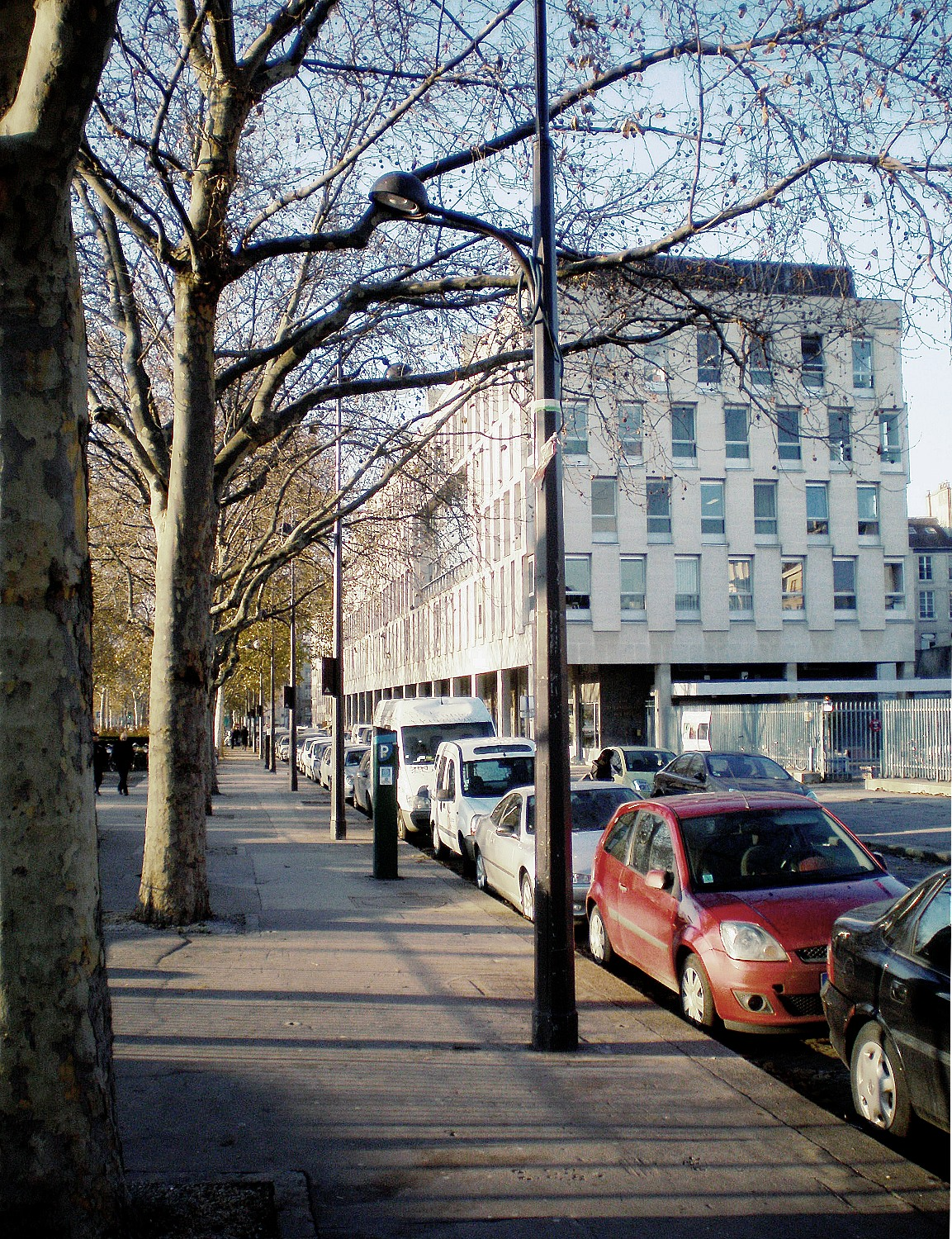
- Marais's site, on Rue de l'Hôtel-de-Ville in Paris.
- Interactive map of Cité internationale des arts
- Builder: Paul Tournon, Olivier-Clément Cacoub and Ngo Viet Thu
- Type: Artist's residency
- Inauguration date: 1965
- Website: www.citeinternationaledesarts.fr

The Cité internationale des arts is a nonprofit foundation, based in Paris, France, managing an artist-in-residence building complex. Its mission is to foster research and creative work by international contemporary artists in all disciplines: visual arts, music, performing arts, architecture, and writing.

Inaugurated in 1965, it comprises 326 studio apartments, spread across two sites, one in the Marais district and the other in Montmartre. It hosts approximately 1,000 artists each year, making it the largest artists' residence in the world.

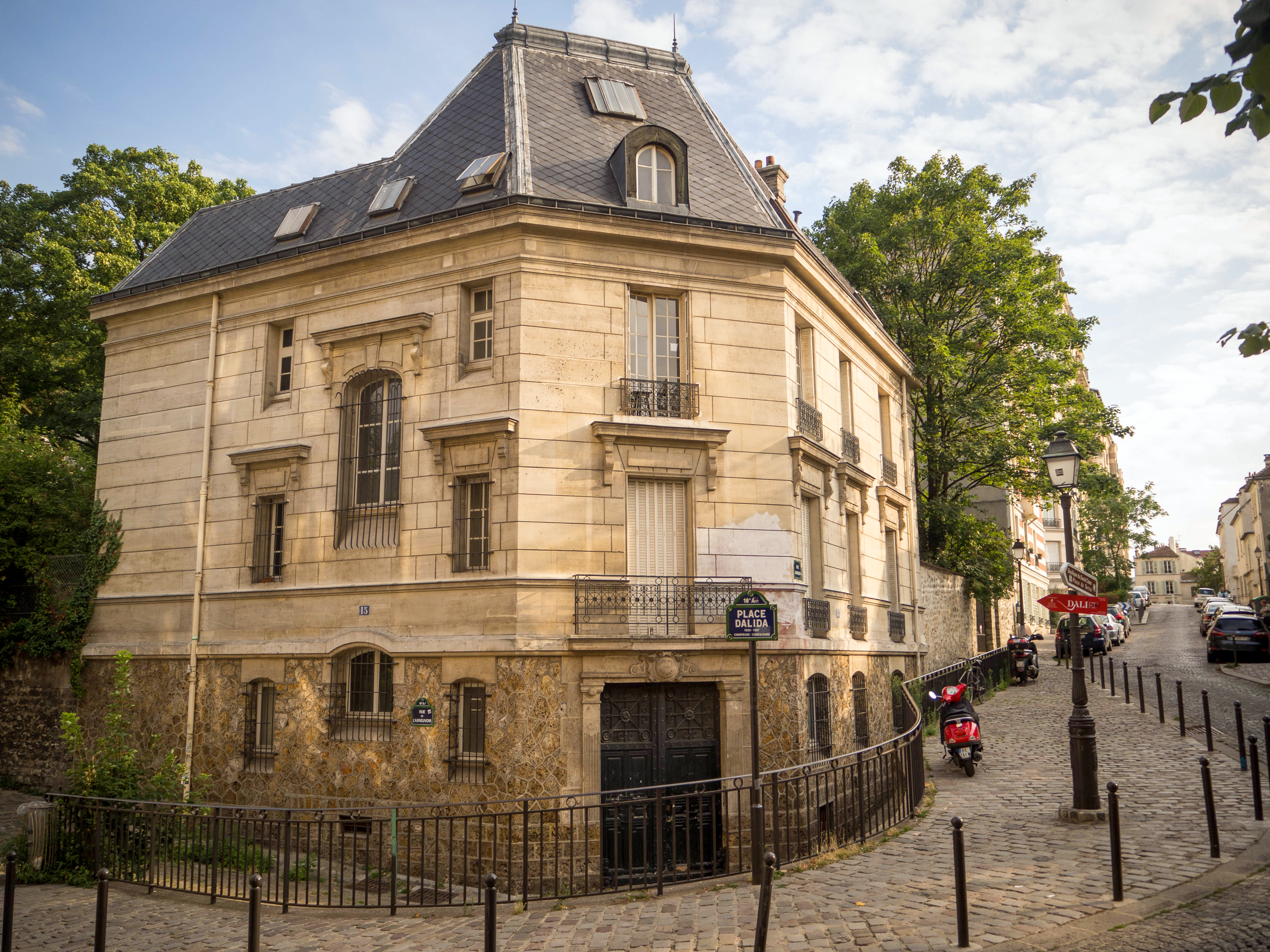
Montmartre's site, n^{o} 16 rue Girardon.

== History and description ==
The idea for the Cité internationale des arts was first proposed by the Finnish artist Eero Snellman (1890-1951) at the 1937 Exposition Internationale des Arts et Techniques dans la Vie Moderne. After the Second World War, Félix and Simone Brunau, a couple member of the French résistance close to the Général de Gaulle has worked to bring the idea to fruition by turning it into a real project. The fledging project took the form of an association created in 1947, before becoming a foundation in 1957, which benefited from the support of the Ministry of Culture and the Ministry of Foreign Affairs as well as the Academy of Fine Arts and the City of Paris.

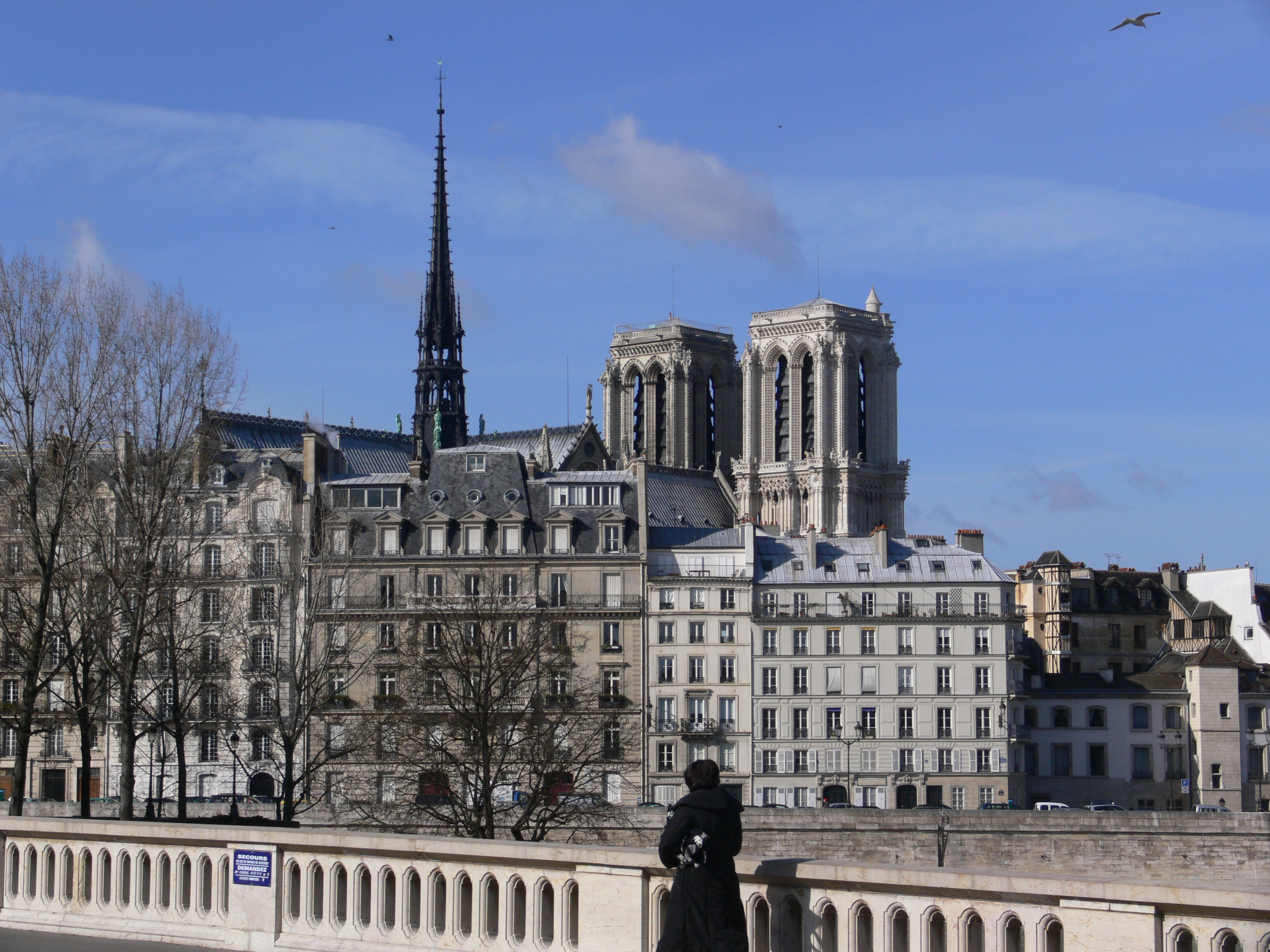
View of the bridge Pont Louis-Philippe and Notre-Dame, on which Marais' site overlooks

It had its first headquarters at the Ministry of Culture on rue de Valois before moving to 18 rue de l'Hôtel de Ville in the 4th arrondissement, the City of Paris, having been granted an emphyteutic lease for the construction of a set of live-work spaces.

Officially opening in 1965, the Cité internationale des arts offers residency workshops known as "living workshops" (French: ateliers-logements) designed for work and housing, located at two main sites. One, located in the Marais (rue de l'Hôtel-de-Ville opposite île Saint-Louis) includes the first building from 1965 as well as buildings from the XVIIth and XVIIIth centuries or constructions from the 1970s and 1990s, while the second is located in Montmartre, at 16 rue Girardon, with various buildings from the XVIIIth century and modern worshops from the 1960s.The Marais location site was the work of architects prix de rome Paul Tournon, Ngo Viet Thu and Olivier-Clément Cacoub.

== Cultural programmes ==
For sixty years the Cité internationale des arts has welcomed international artists to promote contemporary art and help artists in their creation. With 135 international partners, whether States' governments, universities, cultural associations or private institutions, it has various residency programs from 2 months to a year destined to artists from all age, nationality and practice (dance,

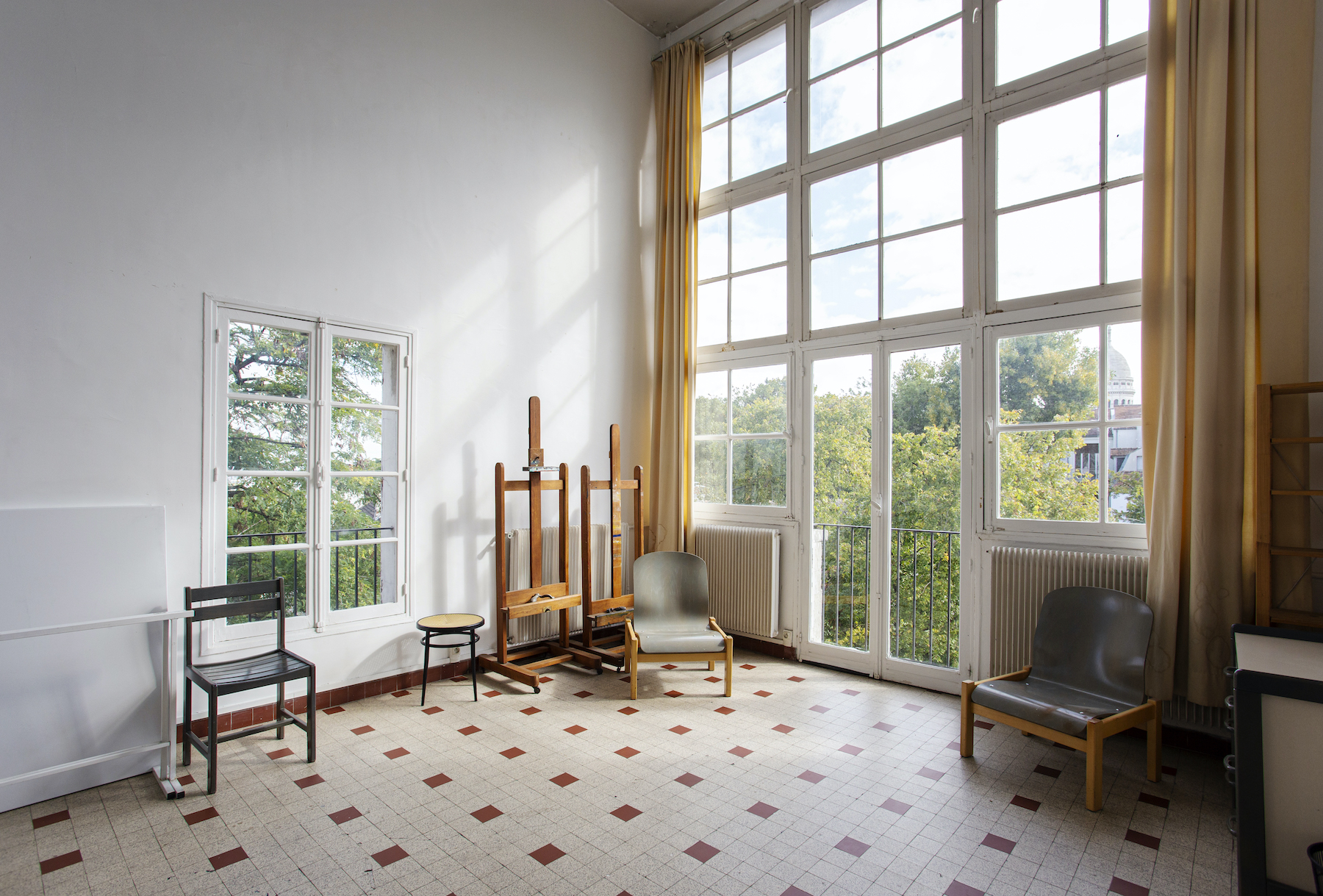
A studio in Montmartre

The Cité internationale des arts offers collective workshops for visual artists (engraving, screen printing and ceramic), rehearsal studios for musicians and dancers as well as an auditorium that can host events organised either with the artists in residence, or by partners and non-partner structures of the Foundation. It also offers a support program for artists, with tutoring, French classes, meeting with professionals from the art world and visits of contemporary art institutions Its residency programs are aimed at French and foreign artists who wish to work in Paris.

The Foundation organizes a few exhibition each year, presenting art from previous or current residents, it also opens every wednesday for artist's open studios, when the public can meet and discover the creation of residents.

The Foundation has accommodated more than 35,000 artists since its foundation.

== Former residents ==
=== Photographers and filmmakers ===
- Joan Jonas
- Gary Hill
- Carrie Mae Weems
- Thomas Ruff
- Lorna Simpson
- Wolfgang Tillmans
- Apichatpong Weerasethakul
- Zanele Muholi
- Dominique Gonzalez-Foerster
- James Coleman
- Thomas Demand
- Anri Sala
- Youssef Nabil
- Johan Grimonprez
- James Barnor
- Moyra Davey
- Éric Baudelaire

=== Visual artists ===
- Louise Bourgeois
- Alighiero Boetti
- Dan Graham
- Ilya Kabakov
- Gabriel Orozco
- Ibrahim Mahama
- Pierre Huyghe
- Philippe Parreno
- Huang Yong Ping
- Giulio Paolini
- Howardena Pindell
- Richard Tuttle
- Tatiana Trouvé
- Miriam Cahn
- Anne Imhof
- ORLAN
- Ulla von Brandeburg
- Jean-Michel Othoniel
- Adel Abdessemed
- Haegue Yang
- Nil Yalter
- Kimsooja
- Johan Creten
- Tarek Atoui
- Lygia Clark
- Jim Dine
- Johan Creten
- Martha Wilson
- Harmony Hammond
- Mircea Cantor
- Simone Fattal
- Lili Reynaud-Dewar
- Latifa Echakhch
- Leonor Antunes
- Chéri Samba
- Maria Nordman
- Thu Van Tran
- Peter Saul
- Lee Bae
- Philippe Apeloig
- Jagoda Buic
- Pauline Boudry
- Ser Serpas
- Philippe Apeloig
- Béatrice Casadesus
- Matthieu Laurette
- Gaëlle Choisne
- Melik Ohanian
- Grégory Chatonsky
- Minia Biabiany
- Katinka Bock
- Dineo Seshee Bopape
- Tan Choh Tee

=== Musicians ===
- Laurie Anderson
- Astor Piazzola
- Céleste Boursier-Mougenot
- Serge Gainsbourg
- Janusz OIejniczak
- Anne Queffélec
- Emma Daumas

=== Writers ===
- Camille Bryen
- Harald Szeemann
- Saul Williams
