= Salzburger Kunstverein =

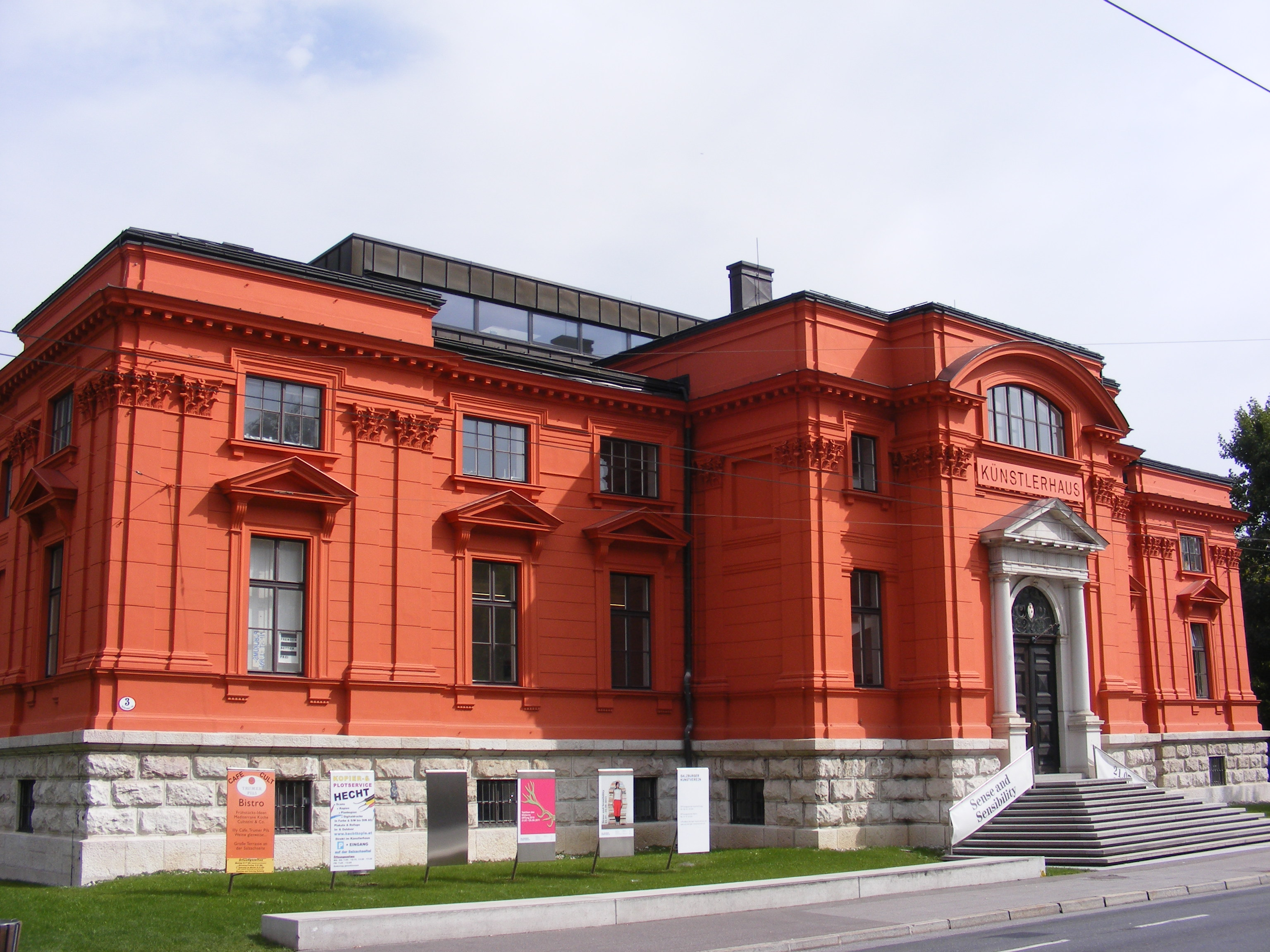
- Salzburg's Künstlerhaus - site of the Salzburger Kunstverein
- Formation: March 10, 1844; 182 years ago
- Purpose: To awaken love for art, and educate a sense for art
- Headquarters: Künstlerhaus
- Location(s): Hellbrunner Straße 3 5020 Salzburg Austria
- Members: 550 (including 450 artists)
- President: Gerda Ridler
- Director: Mirela Baciak
- Staff: 10
- Website: www.salzburger-kunstverein.at

The Salzburger Kunstverein is a contemporary art organisation that specialises in art exhibitions. It is located in Salzburg, Austria, and is housed in the Künstlerhaus, which was built in 1885. The Salzburger Kunstverein organizes between ten and twelve exhibitions of international and Austrian artists annually. The current director is Mirela Baciak.

== History ==
The Salzburger Kunstverein was founded on March 10, 1844. It was one of the first of such institutions in Austria. According to its founding principles, its aim is "to awaken love for art and educate a sense for art". In 1885 the "Künstlerhaus" was built. Today, it is still the Kunstverein's headquarters; it contains studio and exhibition areas as well.

Since 1992 the program has been elaborated and organised by the respective director (1992 Hildegund Amanshauser, 1993-1995 Silvia Eiblmayr, 1996-2004 Hildegund Amanshauser, 2005-2013 Hemma Schmutz, 2014-03/2023 Séamus Kealy, since 07/2023 Mirela Baciak) and aims to meet international standards. By means of exhibitions, symposia, lectures, workshops or networking projects with other institutions the concept aspires to discover new forms of promoting art.

In 2008 the Salzburger Kunstverein was awarded the ADKV-ART COLOGNE Price (together with the Westfälischer Kunstverein Münster) for its "excellent exhibition making and art education".

== Selected exhibitions ==
Source: Salzburger Kunstverein

- 1993 Heimo Zobernig
- 1995 Marlene Dumas
- 1997 Elke Denda / Candida Höfer
- 1998 Stan Douglas
- 1999 Luc Tuymans
- 2000 Monica Bonvicini
- 2001 Erwin Wurm
- 2002 Elizabeth Peyton
- 2004 Cameron Jamie
- 2005 Ines Doujak
- 2006 Soleil Noir
- 2007 Peter Piller
- 2008 Gülsün Karamustafa
- 2009 Performing the East
- 2009 Dan Perjovschi
- 2010 Roman Ondák
- 2010 Manfred Pernice
- 2011 Constantin Luser
- 2012 Anna Jermolaewa
- 2014 Punctum
- 2014 Bedwyr Williams
- 2015 Überschönheit
- 2015 Paloma Varga Weisz
- 2015 Nedko Solakov
- 2016 Hans Schabus
- 2016 Stan Douglas
- 2016 The People's Cinema
- 2017 A Painter's Doubt
- 2017 Geoffrey Farmer / Gareth Moore
- 2018 Ashley Hans Scheirl
- 2019 Omer Fast
- 2020 Megan Rooney
- 2022 Khalil Rabah
- 2022 Camille Henrot
- 2023 Tarik Kiswanson
- 2024 The Myth of Normal
- 2024 The Color of Energy

== Prizes and awards ==
- 2008 ADKV-ART COLOGNE prize for Kunstvereine
- 2014 "Exhibition of the Year: Punctum", Profil Magazin (Profil 52, print, 22. Dec. 2014)
- 2015 Salzburg Culture Poster prize for the exhibition poster Invisible Violence
- 2016 "Top Five Exhibitions of the Year: The People's Cinema", Profil Magazin (Profil 52, print, 19. Dec. 2016)
- 2017 Salzburg Culture Poster prize for the exhibition poster A Painter's Doubt

== Selected publications ==
- 1994 150 Jahre Salzburger Kunstverein
- 1995 Lois Renner
- 1998 Florian Pumhösl
- 2005 Michael Raedecker
- 2005 Trichtlinburg
- 2007 Archiv Peter Piller. Zeitung
- 2008 Otto Zitko. Die Konstruktion der Geste
- 2011 Roman Ondák
- 2014 Punctum
- 2015 Stan Douglas
- 2016 The People's Cinema
- 2017 A Painter's Doubt
- 2020 Gernot Wieland
- 2021 ... Line as Thought, Lines as Universes ...
- 2024 Vasilis Papageorgiou. Sunseekers or Dimming the Sun or
- 2024 The Color of Energy

== Literature ==
- Gottfried Goiginger: Toleranz als Programm. Der Salzburger Kunstverein nach 1945. In: 150 Jahre Salzburger Kunstverein (Ed.), Kunst und Öffentlichkeit 1844–1994. Salzburg 1994, p. 171–199.
- Roman Höllbacher: Das Künstlerhaus als Denkmal des Kunstvereins. In: 150 Jahre Salzburger Kunstverein (Ed.), Kunst und Öffentlichkeit 1844–1994. Salzburg 1994, p. 47–77.
- Christa Svoboda: Zur Geschichte des Salzburger Kunstvereins. In: 150 Jahre Salzburger Kunstverein (Ed.), Kunst und Öffentlichkeit 1844–1994. Salzburg 1994, p. 9–46.
