= Johan Creten =

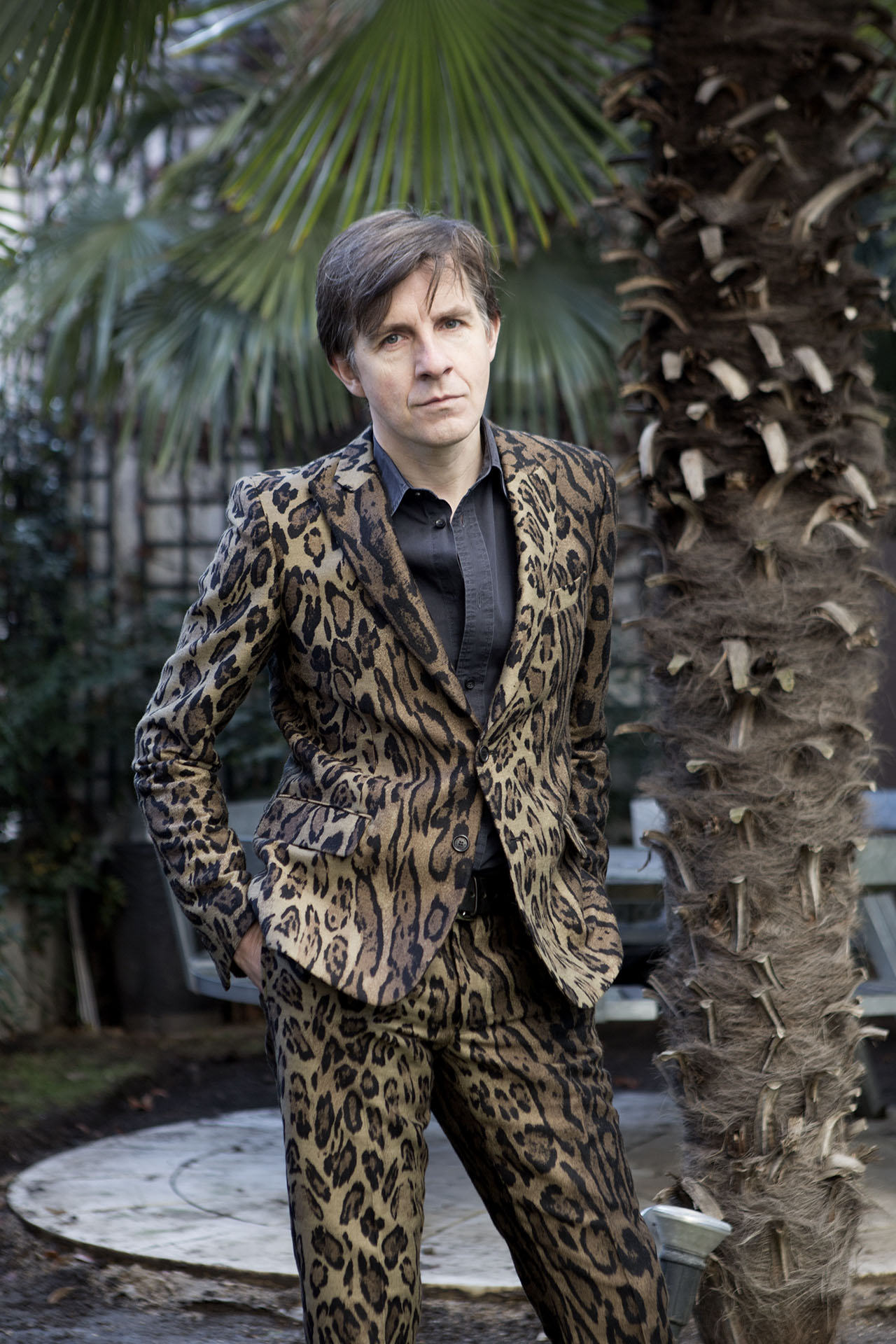
Johan Creten

Johan Creten (born 1963) is a Flemish sculptor, born in Sint-Truiden, Belgium. He lives and works in Paris, France, where he benefited from an artist residency at Cité internationale des arts in 1986, 1987, 1991, 1993. In 2009 he was nominated for the Flemish Culture Prize.

== Life and career ==
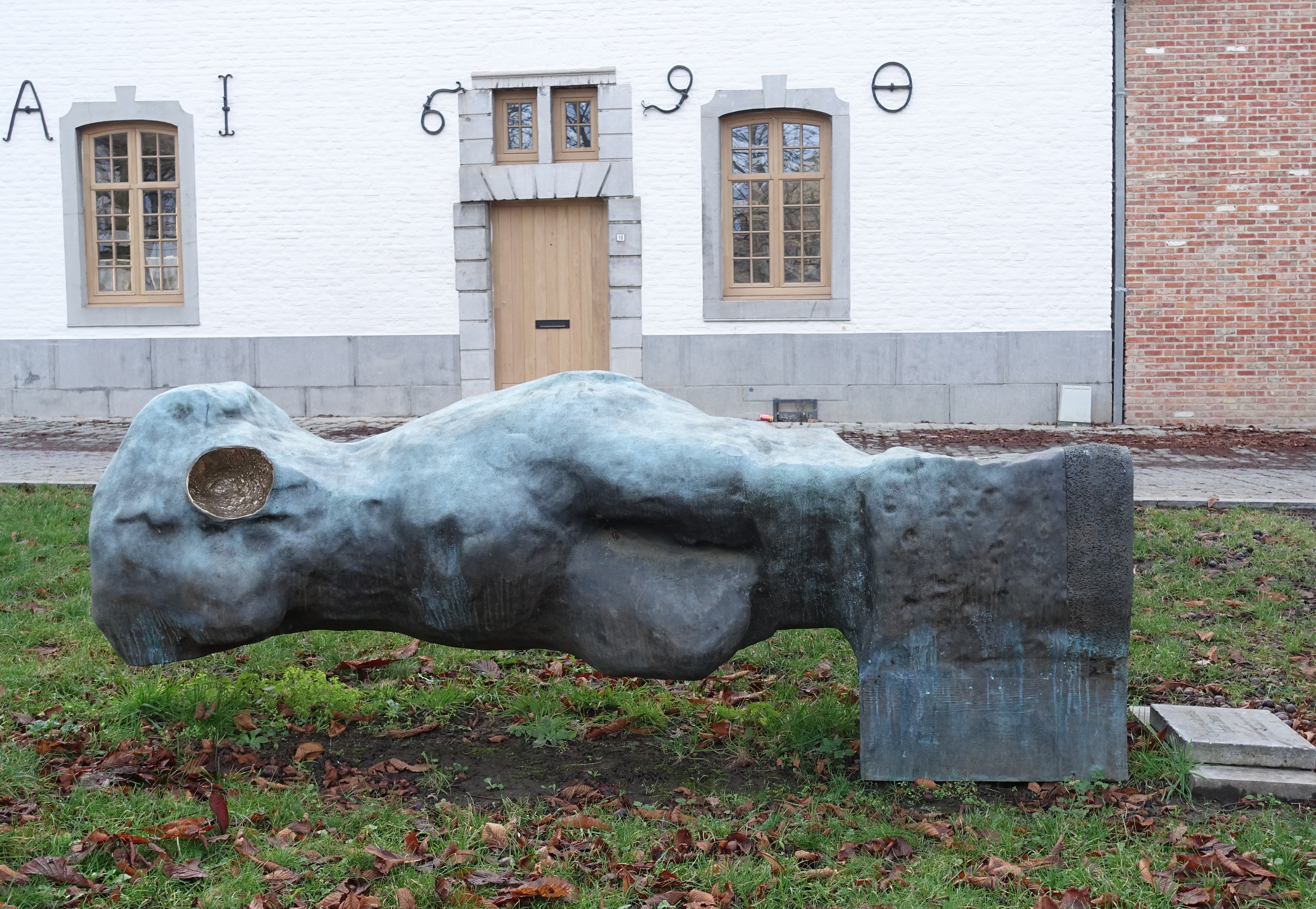
Christina Mirabilis (Sint-Truiden)

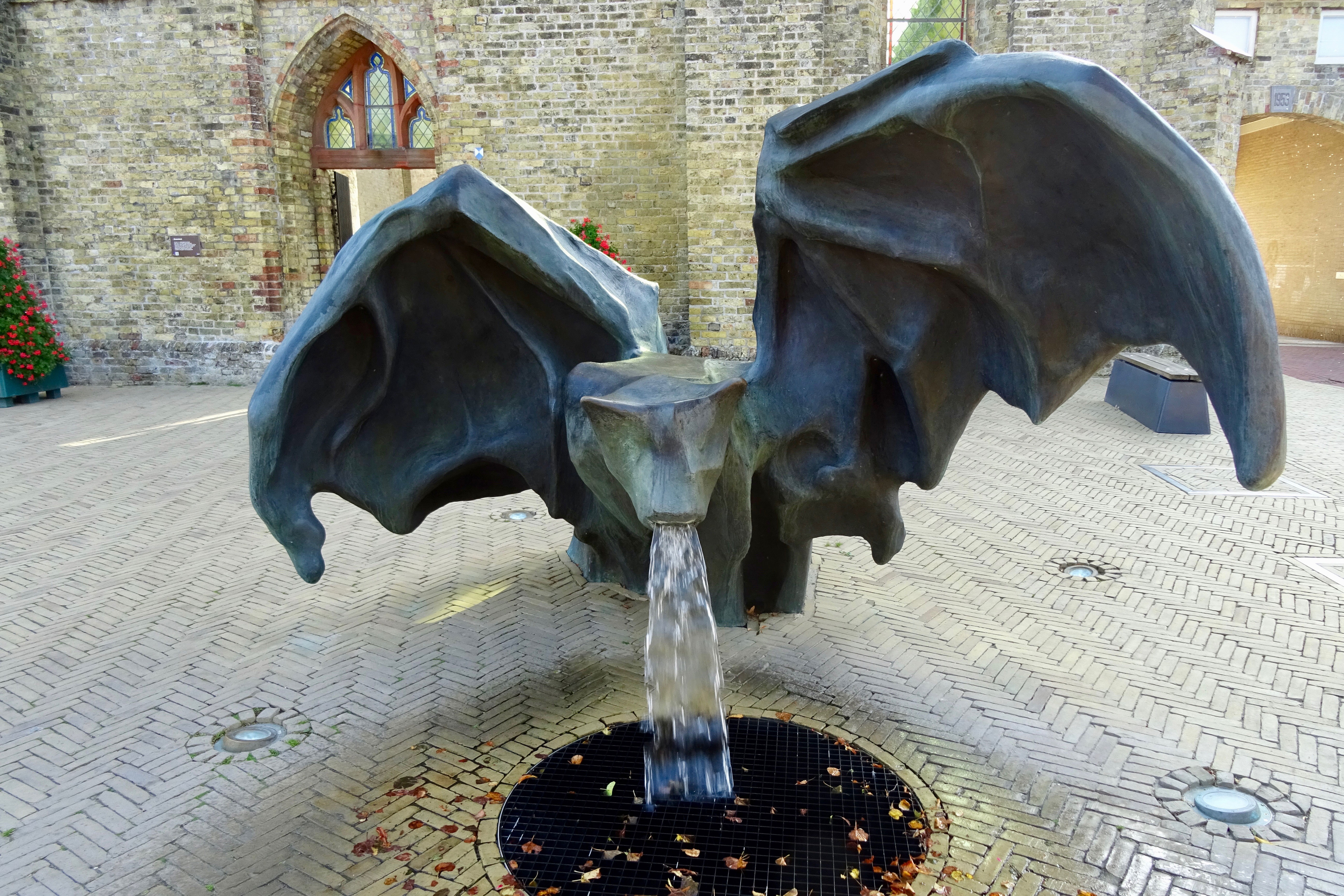
The Bat (Bolsward)

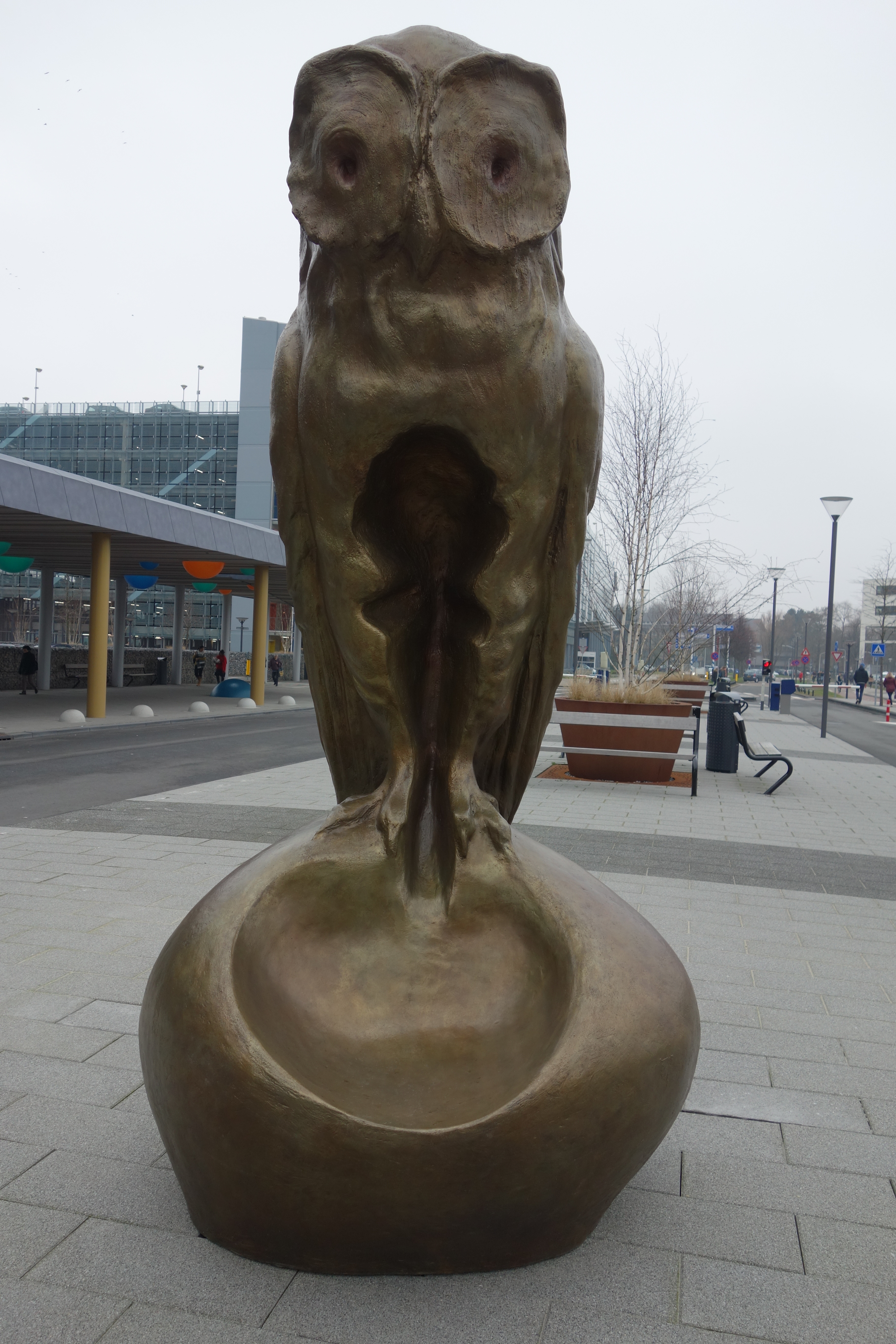
Le Grand Vivisecteur (Leiden)

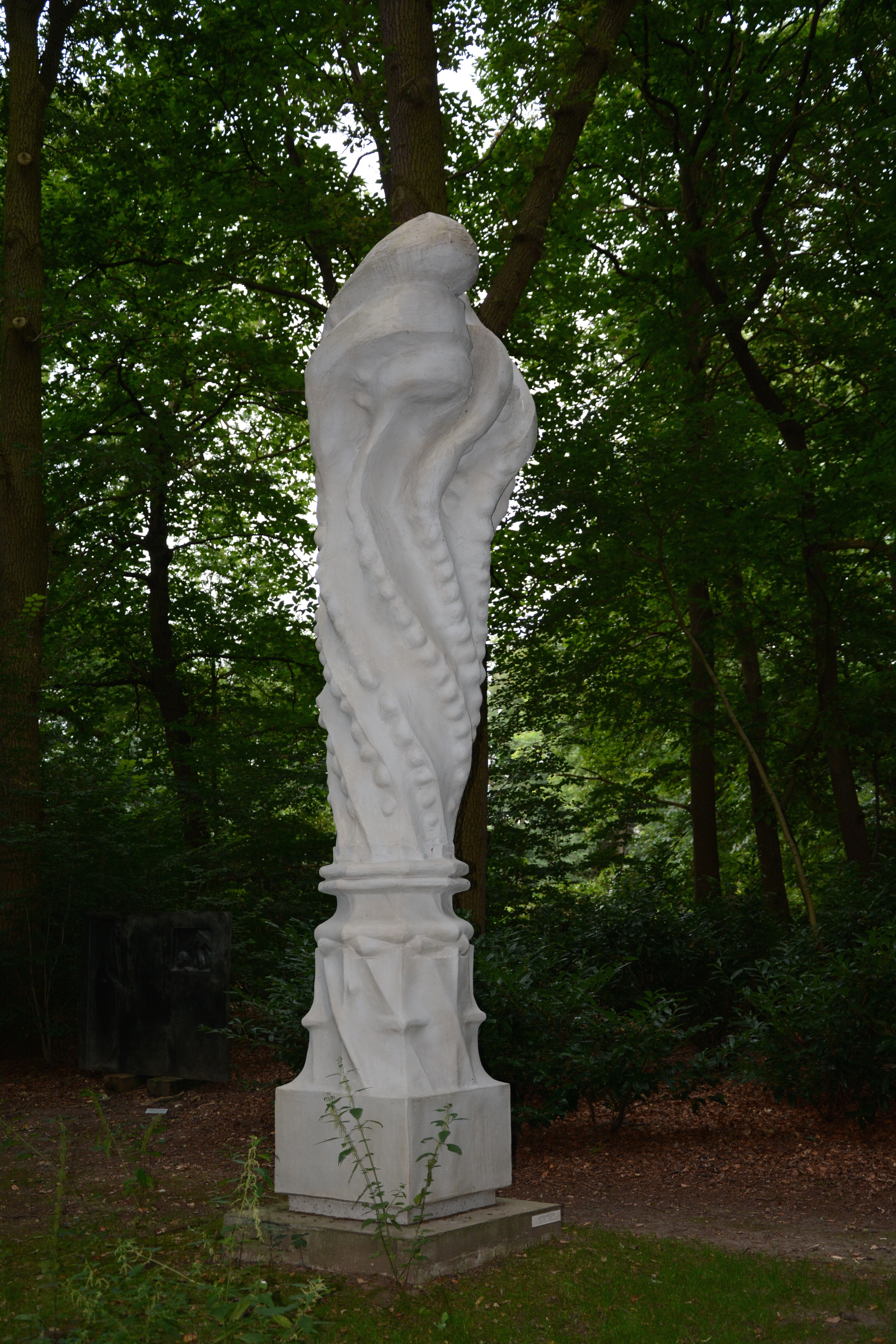
The Column (Antwerp)

== Exhibitions ==
2003

- "Johan Creten", Bass Museum of Art, Miami, USA

2007

- "Johan Creten. Beelden", Stedelijk Museum de Lakenhal, Leiden, Netherlands

2008

- "Johan Creten- De gewonden/Les Blessées", Keramiekmuseum Princessehof, Leeuwarden, Netherlands
- "Johan Creten, sculptures", Musée de la Chasse et de la Nature, Paris, France
