= Guillaume Leblon =

French sculptor and visual artist

Guillaume Leblon (born 1971 in Lille) is a French sculptor and visual artist. He lives and works in New York City.

== Life and career ==
Guillaume Leblon studied at the École nationale supérieure des beaux-arts de Lyon, France, from which he received his diploma in 1997. He continued his career through numerous residencies, including at the Rijksakademie van beeldende kunsten in Amsterdam, the Netherlands (1999–2000) and at the International Studio & Curatorial Program (ISCP) in New York in 2008. Leblon participated in the Sonsbeek exhibition in Arnhem, the Netherlands, in the 2001 edition that was curated by Jan Hoet. In 2011, he was nominated for the Marcel Duchamp Prize.

== Artistic work ==
Guillaume Leblon’s artistic practice is built on a number of integrative processes, incorporating elements of sculpture, performance, sound and film in heterogenous installations of dynamic reflection. Guillaume Leblon’s oeuvre is characterized by the association of physical and sentimental phenomena, exploring the intersection of imposing constructions and the fluidity of their individual elements, paying particular attention to all of the senses. Rejecting the clear definitions of conceptualism in his work, Leblon emphasizes the individual pathos contained in his constructions, engaging not only the physical elements but also motions that they encourage. Finding some influence in the construction and transmission of intimate interactions encouraged by arte povera artists, his work has previously been compared to that of Franz West or Thomas Schütte.

Often producing monumental works that actively interact with the spaces in which they are exhibited, Leblon’s pieces build on their surroundings as they intersect and reconfigure their environment. A number of Leblon’s pieces take this approach, like Raum (2006), a massive white cube constructed from plaster walls that intrudes on the gallery in which it is exposed and effectively directs the movement of the visitor. The piece National Monument (2006–2014) is another excellent example of this practice – a tremendous gray cube of fresh clay held together with sections of white fabric reminiscent of bandages, the installation is placed straddling two rooms of an exhibition space. Bisecting and simultaneously redefining the spaces of galleries and museums in which the installation is shown, such pieces confront two- and three-dimensional vectors in temporal and spatial capacities, inhabiting and redefining their surroundings. The imposing installation engages the viewer not only through controlling their movements, but also by captivating all of the senses. Kept malleable by a steady stream of water pouring over the clay, the act that interjects a fluidity and life to a seemingly solid construction also fills the exhibition space with a characteristic smell that engages the senses of the viewer. A similar imposition in the spaces of exhibition can be found in the piece Faces contre terre (2010), in which in various elements of discarded furniture cover the floor of the room in which they are placed. Arranged in a non-hierarchical manner, blocking the way and forcing the viewer to actively interact with the work through walking on it. (in focus) The combination of striking, the imposition of shapes through manipulating the exhibition and guiding the viewer is therefore central to his practice.

Since 2009, Leblon has been engaging with sculptures assembled from assorted elements heterogenous in provenance and time, creating structures that unite external elements in one time and space within the artist’s atelier. The shifting and detached nature of Leblon’s work is visualized through this mise-en-scene, creating tensions between the different states of the elements of his pieces. Working at times with 16mm film, Leblon follows movement that crosses architectural and natural spaces, invading their environments through active interjection. The looped film Villa Cavrois (2000) is an example of this practice, exploring a decaying villa together with the viewer, revealing and concealing rooms and locations in an unexpected journey. Similarly, Leblon explores the relationship between the artist, the viewer and the landscape they inhabit in Temps Libre (2001), a film showing him jumping from a third-story building into the abyss below during the Sonbeek exhibition in Arnhem in 2001.

== Exhibitions ==
=== Selected solo exhibitions ===
- 2022-23: PARADE, Palais de Tokyo, Paris, France
- 2022-23: PATAQUÉS, Nathalie Obadia Gallery, Paris, France
- 2022: The Traveler Walking on a tiptoe, Nathalie Obadia Gallery, Brussels, Belgium
- 2019: AMERICA, Projecte SD Gallery, Barcelona, Spain
- 2019: AEROSOL, LABOR Gallery, Mexico City, Mexico
- 2018: Still Wave, Gallery Carlier Gebauer, Berlin, Germany
- 2018: Guillaume Leblon | There is a man, and more, S.M.A.K., Gent, Belgium
- 2017: PATAQUÉS, Galeria Travesia Cuatro, Guadalajara, Mexico
- 2017: " (...) "youporn", "zbooby", "zerogras", "zÄzette" (…) ", Galerie Jocelyn Wolff, Paris, France
- 2016: THERE IS A MAN, Gallery Carlier Gebauer, Berlin, Germany
- 2016: UNTANGLED FIGURES, Contemporary Art Gallery, Vancouver, Canada
- 2015: Le pods que la main supporte, Panorama, Friche Belle de Mai, Marseille, France
- 2014: À dos de cheval avec le peintre, IAC – Institut d’Art Contemporain, Villeurbanne, Lyon, France
- 2013: backstroke, carlier | gebauer, Berlin, Germany
- 2013: Under my shoe, MassMoca, North Adams, USA
- 2012: Une appropriation de la nature, Musée de Sérignan, Sérignan, France
- 2008: Wenn ein resiender in einer Winternacht, MARTa Herford, Herford, Germany
- 2008: Martian Museum of Terrestrial Art, Barbican Centre, London, UK
- 2008: Guillaume Leblon: Four Ladders, STUK Arts Centre, Leuven, Belgium
- 2008: A Town (Not a City), Kunsthalle St. Gallen, St. Gallen, Switzerland
- 2007: Mimetic, Centre d’art de l’Yonne, Auxerre, France
- 2007: The Re-Conquest of Space, OVERGADEN, Copenhagen, Denmark
- 2007: De leur temps, Musée de Grenoble, Grenoble, France
- 2006: Guillaume Leblon, Kunstverein Düsseldorf, Düsseldorf, Germany
- 2005: Le Génie du lieu, FRAC Bourgogne, Dijon, France
- 2003/2004: PORTAL 2, Kunsthalle Fridericianum, Kassel, Germany

=== Selected group exhibitions ===
- 2020: Des Mondes construits, MNAM, Center Pompidou-Metz, France
- 2019: The house where your live for ever, Garage Rotterdam, The Netherlands
- 2018: Or: Un voyage dans l’histoire de l’art au fil de l’or, MUCEM, Marseille, France
- 2018: Front International Cleveland Triennial for Contemporary Art, Cleveland, USA
- 2017: Singin Stones, Palais de Tokyo hors les murs, Roundhouse, DuSable Museum of African American History, Chicago, USA
- 2017: Paleolithic to Contemporary, Icons and Tools, Jean-David Cahn Gallery, Basel, Switzerland
- 2016: La French Touch, Artspace Boan, Seoul, South Korea
- 2016: ON SITE, FIAC, Petit Palais, Paris France
- 2016: Poésie balistique, La Verrière, FOndation d’entreprise Hermès, Brussels, Belgium
- 2016: Accrochage, a selection from the Pinault Collection, Punta della Dogana, Venice, Italy
- 2016: Collections: Elémentaires, Les Abattoirs, Toulouse, France
- 2015: Villa Toronto, Toronto, Canada
- 2015: L’usage des forms, artisans d’art et artistes, Palais de Tokyo, Paris, France
- 2014–2016: Une Histoire (art archi design/des années 80 à nos jours), Centre Pompidou, Paris, France
- 2014: La nature et ses proportions, Galerie Jocelyn Wolff, Paris France
- 2013: Une preface, Le Plateau, FRAC Ile de France, Paris, France
- 2013: Je jouais avec les chiens et je voyais le ciel et le voyais l’air, Les Pléiades, 30 ans de FRAC, Toulouse, France
- 2013: Map, record, picture, sculpture, Projecte SD, Barcelona, Spain
- 2013: 1966–79, IAC, Villeurbane, France, curator: Laurent-Montaron
- 2013: Die Wahrscheinlichkeit, dass nichts passiert, Carlier Gebauer, Berlin, Germany
- 2013: L’instinct oublié, Galerie Jocelyn Wolff exhibits at gallery Labor, Mexico City, Mexico
- 2012–2013: Rhona Hofman Gallery, Chicago, USA
- 2012: Biennale de Rennes, Rennes, France
- 2012: Autres, être sauvage de Rousseau à nas jours, Musée-château Annecy, France
- 2012: La part de l’autre, Les moulins de Paillard, Poncé-sur-le Loir, France
- 2012: Aire de Lyon, Proa Fondation, Buenos Aires, Argentina, curator: Victoria Noorthoorn
- 2012: Alchemy, Fondacio Joan Miró, Barcelona, Spain

=== Projects ===
- 2013: Monument aux morts, Saint-Martin-Cantalès (15), Auvergne, France
- 2013: Collection Daniel Cordier, carte blanche à Guillaume Leblon, Les Abattoirs, Toulouse, France
- 2008: Curating the Library, De Singel, Antwerp, Belgium. Curator: Moritz Kung.
- 2006–2014: L’Entretien, theater play, written by Thomas Boutoux & Guillaume Leblon, based on a fictive conversation between an artist and a curator.
- 2004: Le Teaser, visual storyline for one of the sixth edition of Le Teaser, with texts by Tom Gidley, Phyllis Kiehl, Simon Takahashi, Tom McCarthy, Metronom Press, Paris

=== Screenings ===
- 2018: Notes, FRAC Bretagne Rennes, France – Notes
- 2007: Villa Cavrois, Tobias Putrih exhibition, Slovenian Pavilion, 52nd Venice Biennial, San Servolo Island, Italy, curator: Francesco Manacorda
- 2002: Villa Cavrois, Polyphonix Film Festival, MNAM, Centre Georges Pompidou, Paris, France
