= Damien Deroubaix =

French painter and sculptor

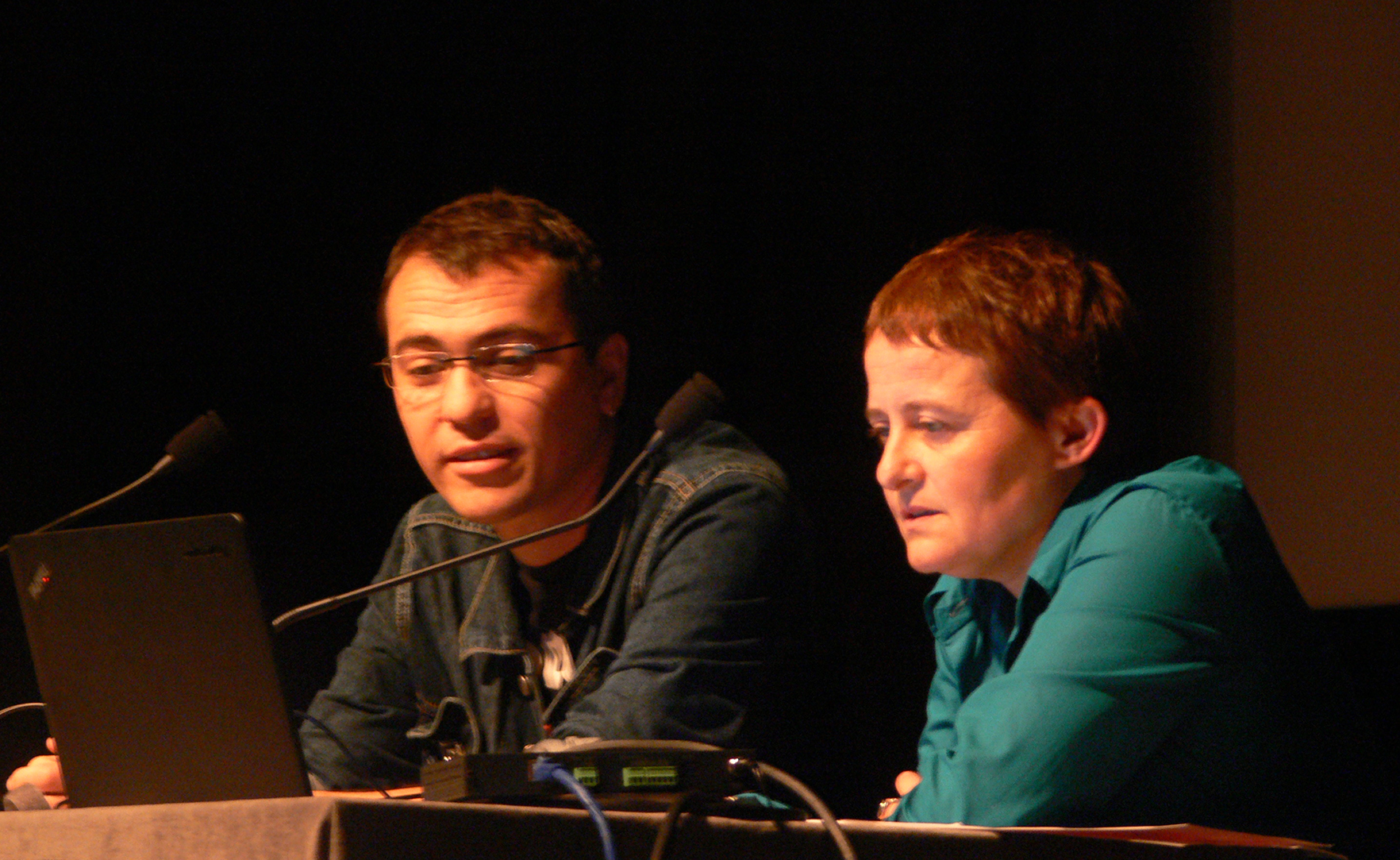
- Damien Deroubaix at the 50th anniversary conference of Nouvelles de l'estampe (October 2013)
- Born: 9 May 1972 (age 54); Lille
- Known for: Painting

Damien Deroubaix (born 9 May 1972 in Lille, France) is a French painter and sculptor.

== Early life and career ==
Deroubaix was born on 9 May 1972 in Lille, France. He graduated from the Regional School of Fine Arts in Saint-Étienne and the Academy of Fine Arts, Karlsruhe. Since 2003, his work has been exhibited in many national collections, museums and institutions in France, Switzerland and Germany. In 2009, he was nominated for Marcel Duchamp Prize.

== Solo exhibitions (selection) ==
- 2021: La Valise d'Orphée, Musée de la Chasse et de la Nature, Fr
- 2019: Headbangers Ball part 3: Alte Meister (Komödie), Kunstmuseum Reutlingen, Germany
- 2018: Headbangers Ball, Musée d'art moderne (Saint-Étienne), Fr
- 2016: Post-Mortem, Creux de l'Enfer, Thiers, Puy-de-Dôme, Fr
- 2016: Picasso et moi, National Picasso Museum, Vallauris, Fr
- 2016: Damien Deroubaix, Best of Part 2, Drawing and Original Prints Museum, Gravelines, Fr
- 2015: El origen del Mundo, Museum of the Holy Cross Abbey, Les Sables-d'Olonne, Fr
- 2014: Picasso et moi, Fondation Maeght, Saint Paul de Vence, Fr
- 2013: South of heaven, Nosbaum Reding Gallery, Luxembourg
- 2011: Der Schlaf der Vernunft, La Chaufferie, Strasbourg, Fr
- 2010: Die Nacht, Kunstmuseum St. Gallen, St. Gallen, Switzerland
