= Gaëlle Choisne =

French visual artist, sculptor and photographer

Gaëlle Choisne, born in Cherbourg in 1985, is a French visual artist, sculptor and photographer.

== Biography ==
Gaëlle Choisne obtained her National Degree of Plastic Expression from the École nationale supérieure des beaux-arts de Lyon. In January 2017, she joined the Rijksakademie van beeldende kunsten in Amsterdam, after completing a year's residency at the Cité internationale des arts in Paris. She lives and works in Paris.

== Artistic career ==
Gaëlle Choisne develops installations combining sculpture and photography. Her favorite themes involve displacement, architecture, matter, organic matter and waste. The human body, although suggested by her creations, is often absent from her work. Nevertheless, the artist compels the viewer to grapple with the artistic obstacle or trap.

Her career has been punctuated by collaborations with contemporary art institutions such as the Museum of Fine Arts of Lyon, the MAMO - Centre d'art de la Cité radieuse in Marseille and the Musée Fabre and Musée Henri Prades in Montpellier.

In September 2018, Gaëlle Choisne presents her first solo exhibition Temple of Love at Bétonsalon - Centre d'art et de recherche. In 2019, she is artist-in-residence at Atelier Van Lieshout in Rotterdam. In the autumn of the same year, she takes part in the Curitiba Biennial in Brazil, as well as the Lyon Biennial. The artist takes part in numerous residencies in France and abroad, including Art3 in Valence and Villa Croce in Genoa.

In 2020, in the film Accumulation primitive, Gaëlle Choisne meets several women, including artist and producer Christelle Oyiri. These stories are complemented by archival videos, poetic references to Haiti and philosophical reflections centered on the enslavement of women. The artist's aim is to highlight emancipating connections between personal stories and the broader contemporary history.

Her sculptural installations are shown in solo and group exhibitions in France and abroad, such as at the Centrale Gallery Powerhouse in Montreal in 2015, at the Beirut Art Center for the 13th Sharjah Biennial in 2017, at the CAFA Art Museum in Beijing in 2017, or at Hunter East Harlem and the Musée d'Art Moderne de la Ville de Paris in 2018.

As part of the Reiffers Art Initiatives 2023 mentoring program, the artist mentor Lorna Simpson chose to support Gaëlle Choisne. This culminated in an exhibition during Paris+ by Art Basel.

The artist was represented in France by Galerie Untilthen. In 2024, she is represented by the gallery Air de Paris.

== Recognition ==
Gaëlle Choisne is the winner of the AWARE 2021 Prize in the “Emerging Artist” category, organized by the Archives of Women Artists, Research and Exhibitions. She is also the winner of the Marcel Duchamp Prize in 2024.

== Engagement ==
Gaëlle Choisne is involved with various private and public institutions, for which she carries out alternative projects. She also organizes creative workshops with schoolchildren and residents of Port-au-Prince, Haiti. She initiates projects focusing on the use of recycled materials, and the development of committed urban planning methods.
