= Bertrand Lamarche =

French artist

Bertrand Lamarche is a French artist, working and living in France. He graduated from la Villa Arson, (Nice FR) and is teaching in the architecture school Paris Malaquais. He was born in 1966 in Paris.

== Career ==
Contemporary artist, his work began by an observation of the landscape, particularly a kind of panorama from the Viaduc John F Kennedy, in Nancy. Initially constituted by architectural models and photographs, his work has gradually integrated meteorological's phenomena such as Vortex, whirlwind and tornado that allow him to create a dramatic tension and to establish conditions to a scenario. An Other Part of his Work is interested in Kate Bush as a tutelar figure, as someone who has raised his interest into turntable, sound and music that he uses in some of his pieces. His passion for modeling and for weather events leads him to create fictional projects that were shown in several exhibitions especially in La Galerie (Noisy le sec France), Le confort Moderne (Poitiers), Palais de Tokyo (Paris), Centre Pompidou (Paris France), Nuit Blanche at the foundation Pierre Bergé Yves Saint Laurent, Thread Waxing Space (NY), Space, the Anthology Film Archives (NY) and Biennal de Montreal.

In 2012, he was nominated for the Marcel Duchamp Prize, and two majors exhibitions at the FRAC Centre (Orléans) and at THE CCC (Tours) were dedicated to his work.
