= Noémie Goudal =

French visual artist (born 1984)

Noémie Goudal (born 7 July 1984) is a French visual artist who lives and works in Paris, France. Her practice centres on the construction of ambitious, illusionistic interventions within the landscape, captured through film, photography, sculpture, and performance.

Goudal has shown her work at a number of international institutions such as the Tate Modern, London, UK; the Venice Theatre Biennale in Italy; the Centre Pompidou in Paris, the Collection Lambert in Avignon, and Arles Festival, France among others. She has also been exhibited in international group exhibitions at the Nasher Museum, Durham, NC, USA; Sharjah Biennial 16, Sharjah City, United Arab Emirates; Frac Nouvelle-Aquitaine La MÉCA, Bordeaux, France; National Museum of Women in the Arts, Washington, USA; Melbourne Photo Biennale, Melbourne, Australia; Whitechapel Gallery, London, UK; Lisbon Architecture Triennale, National Museum of Contemporary Art, Lisbon, Portugal; Horniman Museum, London, UK; and many others.

Goudal’s work is held in public collections including Centre Pompidou, Paris, France; Fotomuseum Winterthur, Switzerland; Photo Elysée, Lausanne, Switzerland; High Museum of Art, Atlanta, USA; Kadist, Paris, France; Norton Museum of Art, West Palm Beach, USA; Kiran Nadar Museum of Art, New Delhi, India; Moderna Museet, Stockholm, Sweden; Victoria & Albert Museum, London, UK and The New Art Gallery Walsall, Walsall, UK.

She is represented by Edel Assanti.

== Early life & education ==
Goudal moved to London, UK when she was 19 and studied at Central Saint Martins where she graduated in Graphic Design. She then went on to pursue a Master's Degree in Photography at the Royal College of Art, graduating in 2010. Shortly before the end-of-year exhibition, she met Charlie Fellows and Jeremy Epstein of Edel Assanti, and exhibited Post Atlantica – the gallery's inaugural show at its new space in a renovated Grade II listed building on Little Titchfield Street in London's Fitzrovia in 2022.

== Career ==
Goudal’s work pushes the boundaries of photography, expanding it into the realms of immersive installation and performance. Underpinned by rigorous research, her projects explore the intersection of ecology and anthropology, challenging theoretical conceptions of the natural world.

Using optical illusion techniques such as anamorphosis and trompe-l’œil, Goudal creates meticulously constructed sets from paper, mirrors, and wood. A deliberate imperfection is always present in his work; elements like visible bulldog clips and poles subtly signify the instability inherent in humans’ relationship with the natural world. By merging real and imagined geographies into a mysterious coexistence, Goudal challenges the limits of perception and understanding.

In her recent work, Goudal engages in an artistic dialogue with the field of paleoclimatology, examining climate and geology through the lens of "deep time" to better understand the planet’s long-term evolution. By drawing an intellectual bridge between our lived experience of "real time" and the vast temporal scale of deep time – measured in millions of years – her work reveals the Earth’s current geographies as fleeting moments within an ongoing cycle of transformation.

=== 2024 Prix Marcel Duchamp ===
In 2024 Goudal was nominated for the Prix Marcel Duchamp, awarded annually to an artist who is either French or living in the country. The Prix Marcel Duchamp is the most prestigious contemporary art prize in France. Goudal’s presentation at the Centre Pompidou was on display between October 2024 and January 2025, and featured new video works created specially for the exhibition.
