= Samuel Rousseau (artist) =

French visual artist

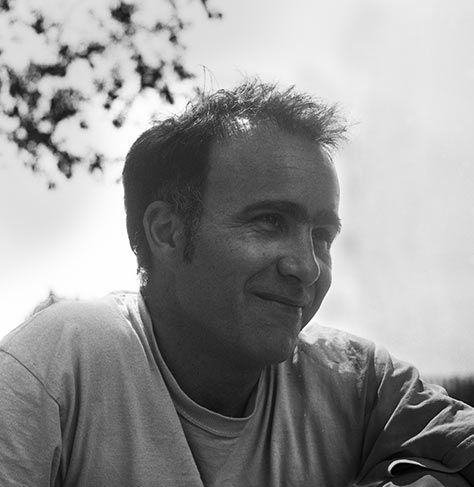
- Born: 1971 (age 54–55); Marseille, France
- Awards: Medal of Arts from the French Academy of Architecture, 2016.
- Website: http://www.samuelrousseau.com/

Samuel Rousseau (born 1971) is a French visual artist.

In 2011 he was nominee for the Marcel Duchamp Prize. In 2016, he received the Académie d'architecture medal.

== Public collections ==
- Fonds régional d'art contemporain, Alsace
- Grenoble Museum, France
- Artothèque art lending library, Bibliothèque municipale de Grenoble, France
- MONA, Museum of Old and New Art - Australia
- Seoul Museum of Contemporary Art - Korea
