= Melik Ohanian =

Armenian-French contemporary artist (born 1969)

- Born: 1969 (age 56–57); Lyon, France
- Known for: Installation art, film, photography,
- Website: ommx.org

Melik Ohanian (in Armenian Մելիք Օհանյան, in classical orthography Օհանեան; born 1969 in France) is a French contemporary artist of Armenian origin. He lives and works in Paris and New York City. His work has been shown in many solo exhibitions including at the Galerie Chantal Crousel and Centre Pompidou in Paris, South London Gallery in London, de Appel in Amsterdam, the Institute d'art contemporain in Villeurbanne, Yvon Lambert Gallery in New York, museum in progress in Vienna, and Centro Cultural Matucana 100 in Santiago.

His art work includes Island of an Island (1998–2002), following the volcanic eruption on the island of Surtsey in 1963; Seven Minutes Before (2004); Invisible Film (2005), a tribute to filmmaker Peter Watkins, particularly Watkins' film Punishment Park; and From the Voice to the Hand (2008).

He has also taken part in group exhibitions around the world, including the 52nd and 56th Venice Biennale (representing France and Armenia), the São Paulo Art Biennial (representing France), the Berlin Biennale and Biennale of Sydney in 2004, the Moscow and Lyon Biennales in 2005, and the Gwangju and Seville Biennales in 2006.

== Solo exhibitions ==
- 2018
  - Les Réverbères de la Mémoire, Trembley Park, Geneva, Switzerland
- 2016
  - Under Shadows, Marcel Duchamp Award 2015, Centre Pompidou, Paris, France
- 2015
  - Days, I See what I Saw and what I will See, Art Unlimited, Basel, Switzerland
  - Memory, Republic of Armenia Pavilion, 56. Venice Biennale
  - Datcha Project — A Zone of No Production, Special Session, Armenia
  - Stuttering, Galerie du Château, Domaine de Chaumont-sur-Loire, France
- 2014
  - Stutttering, Galerie Chantal Crousel & La Douane, Paris, France
  - Stuttering, Centre d’Art Régional Contemporain L-R, Sète, France
  - Welcome To Hanksville, Utah Museum of Contemporary Art, Salt Lake City, United States
  - Datcha Project — A Zone of No Production, Session #005, Armenia
- 2013
  - Points d’Intentions, Centre d’Art – Les Eglises, Chelles, France
- 2012
  - Days, I See what I Saw and what I will See, Lo Schermo dell’Arte Film Festival, Florence, Italy
  - In The Desert of Images, Mumbai Art Room, Mumbai, India
  - Points d’Intentions, Centre d’Art – Les Eglises, Chelles, France
  - Concrete Tears, 3451, Musée National Pablo Picasso, Chapelle Vallauris, France
- 2011
  - {display : none;}, Galerie Ecole des Beaux Arts de Montpellier, France
  - Days, I See what I Saw and what I will See, Galerie Chantal Crousel, Paris, France
  - Datcha Project, Session #004, Armenia
  - Peripherical Communities, London, Rich Mix, London, UK
- 2010
  - Cadence Modulaire – Public Art – UPR – Hôpital Saint-Antoine, Paris, France
  - Lightbox, Centre Pompidou, Paris, France
  - Datcha Project, Session #002, Armenia
  - Datcha Project, Session #003, Armenia
- 2009
  - Blank, Melik Ohanian & Romain Kronenberg, Paris, France
  - From The Voice to The Hand**, In Between, Centre Musical Goutte d’Or – Barbara, Paris, France
  - Datcha Project, Session #001, Armenia
- 2008
  - El Agua de Niebla, Matucana 100, Santiago, Chile
  - Datcha Project, Session #000, Armenia
  - From The Voice to The Hand, a co-existent exhibitions project of 15 venues at the same time, Paris, France
    - Le Plateau / FRAC Ile-De-France, Paris, France
    - Abbaye de Maubuisson, Paris, France
    - MAC/VAL, Ivry sur Seine, France
    - Collection, Centre Pompidou, Paris
    - Cité Nationale de l’Histoire de l’Immigration, Paris, France
    - Galerie de Multiples, Paris, France
    - Association FACE, La Courneuve, Paris, France
    - Cinéma l’Entrepot, Paris, France
    - Le CentQuatre, Paris, France
    - Yvon Lambert – Librairie, Paris, France
- 2007
  - 37 seconds- Melik Ohanian, CCA Kitakyushu, Japan
  - Harun Farucki & Melik Ohanian, Lunds Konsthall, Sweden
- 2006
  - Seven Minutes Before, South London Gallery, London, UK
  - (M)UT(E)OPIA, Galerie Chantal Crousel, Paris, France
  - Somewhere In Time, De Appel, Amsterdam, Netherlands
  - Let's Turn or Turn Around, IAC Villeurbanne, France
- 2005
  - ArtPace, San Antonio, USA
  - With Sean Snyder and Pia Ronicke, Fruit Market Gallery, Edinburgh, Scotland
  - A Moment as an Event, PERFORMA 05, New York, USA
- 2004
  - Seven Minutes Before, French Pavillon XXVIe São Paulo Biennale, Brazil
  - Revolving Analogia, Yvon Lambert Gallery, New York, USA
  - {T}HERE, Centre pour l’image Contemporaine, Saint Gervais, Geneva, Switzerland
  - Welcome to Hanksville, Galerie Dvir, Tel Aviv, Israel
- 2003
  - SlowMotion, from Slave to Valse, CCA Kitakyushu, Japan
  - Welcome To Hanksville, Studio Yvon Lambert, Paris
  - Sound Billboard, Museum in Progress, Vienna, Austria
  - You are mY destinY, The Atlanta College of Art, Atlanta, USA
  - Alightningtruckonablueracetrack, Galerie BF15, Lyon, France
- 2002
  - Nightsnow, Galerie Navona, Rome, Italy
  - Island of an Island, Art Unlimited, Basel, Switzerland
  - Nightsnow, Galerie Chantal Crousel, Paris
  - Island of an Island and Peripherical Communities, Palais de Tokyo, Paris, France
  - Freezing Film, FRAC, Montpellier, France

== Group exhibitions ==
- 2017
  - I travelled the world and the seven seas, Royal Antwerp Atheneum, Belgium
  - Borderland, Mondes Flottants, 14th Lyon Biennale, Lyon, France
  - Paysages du monde, Marcel Duchamp Award nominees, Espace Musées, Aéroport Paris-Charles de Gaulle, France
  - De quoi l’image est-elle le nom ?, Biennale du Mois de la Photo, Montreal, Canada
  - Transhumance, Centre international d'art et du paysage de Vassivière, France
- 2016
  - Dreamlands: Immersive cinema and art, 1905-2016, Whitney Museum, New York, USA
  - Il y a de l’autre, Les Rencontres d'Arles, Atelier des Forges, France
  - 20th Biennale of Sydney, Sydney, Australia
- 2015
  - Prix Marcel Duchamp 2015, FIAC, Grand Palais, Paris
  - L’Effet Vertigo, MAC/VAL, Vitry-sur-Seine, France
  - Là où commence le jour, LaM, Villeneuve d’Ascq, France
  - Allures, Les Turbulences, FRAC Centre, Orléans, France
  - L’heure qu’il est, Centre d'Art Contemporain, Yverdon-les-bains, Switzerland
  - Le Point De Fuite De l’Histoire, Centre d’Art et Photographie, Lectoure, France
  - Prix Marcel Duchamp, Carré d’Art, Nîmes, France
- 2014
  - Music Palace, the power of music seen by visual artists, curated by Diana Wiegersma, Fondation Boghossian, Villa Empain, Brussels, Belgium
  - Simples gestes, curated by Jean de Loisy and Sandra Adam-Couralet, La Grande Place, Musée du cristal Saint-Louis, Saint-Louis-lès-bitche, France
  - Der Blitz, curated by Denis Isaia and Federico Mazzonelli, Galleria Civica G. Segantini, Arco Di Trento, Italy
  - Entre-temps, l'artiste narrateur, curated by Angeline Scherf and Odile Burluraux, MOCA Chengdu, China
  - Des choses en moins, des choses en plus, curated by Sebastien Faucon and Agnès Violeau, Palais de Tokyo, Paris, France
  - Ilots d'Utopies: Un esprit Jaurès, Musée / Centre du Verre, Carmaux, France
- 2013
  - All About These..., Viafarini Docva, Milan, Italy
  - Sound Design For Future Films, Et al., San Francisco, USA
  - El Agua De Niebla, Scotiabank Nuit Blanche, Toronto, Canada
  - Sans Matières Ajoutées by About Blank, CNEAI, Paris, France
  - Le Pont, Musée d'Art Contemporain, Marseille, France
  - Honey I rearranged the collection, Passage de Retz, Paris, France
  - Bande à part, Galerie Chantal Crousel, Paris, France
  - Libération Annlee, Ecole Supérieure des Beaux-Arts, Montpellier, France
  - Tireless Refrain, Nam June Paik Art Center, Korea
  - Im Dreaming About a Reality, La Douane, Galerie Chantal Crousel, Paris, France
- 2012
  - In spite of it all, Sharjah Art Foundation, Sharjah, UAE
  - Collection'12, Institut d’art contemporain, Villeurbanne, France
  - OilScapes, Peacock Visual Arts, Centre for Contemporary Art, Scotland, UK
  - The Eyes of the Soul - A selection of works from the collection of Isabelle and Jean-Conrad Lemaître, Fundació Godia, Barcelona, Spain
  - A Blind Spot, curated by Catherine David, Berlin Documentary Forum, Haus der Kulturen der Welt, Berlin, Germany
  - Néon, Who’s afraid of red, yellow and blue ?, La Maison Rouge, Paris, France
  - Living With Video, curated by Chantal Crousel, Pavillon Downtown, Dubai, UAE
- 2011
  - J’ai Deux Amours, Cité Nationale de l’Histoire de l’Immigration, Paris, France
  - El Agua de Niebla, FIAC 2011, Jardin des Tuileries, Paris, France
  - Entre-Temps, L’artiste Narrateur, Collection MAM Paris, Taipei, Taiwan
  - Atmosphères, Collection FRAC Rhône-Alpes, Romans, France
  - Entre-Temps, L’artiste Narrateur, Collection MAM Paris, Minsheng, Shanghai, China
  - Nuages, Cité Radieuse, Marseille, France
  - Magical Consciousness, Arnolfini, Bristol, UK
  - 10. Sharjah Biennal, Sharjah, United Arab Emirates
- 2010
  - Collection, MAC VAL, Paris
  - Persistence of Vision II, Nikolaj Contemporary Art, Copenhagen, Denmark
  - L'Homme Debout, Galerie Chantal Crousel, FIAC, Paris
  - Still/Moving, The Israel Museum, Jerusalem, Israel
  - Sound Design for Future Films, Wexner Center for the Arts Columbus, Ohio, US
  - Persistence of Vision I, FACT, Liverpool, UK
  - Telling Stories, WUK Kunsthalle, Vienna, Austria
- 2009
  - America, Beirut Art Center, Lebanon
  - L’Attraction de l’Espace, Musée d’Art Moderne, Saint-Etienne, France
  - Entre-Temps, L’artiste Narrateur, Collection du Musée d’Art Moderne de la Ville de Paris MIS/Paco de Artes, São Paulo et Oi Futuro, Rio de Janeiro, Brazil
  - Behind The Image, The Image Behind, ArteFact Festival, STUK Kunstencentrum, Leuven, Belgium
  - Los Tiempos de un Lugar, Centro de Arte y Naturaleza, Fundacion Beulas, Huesca, Spain
- 2008
  - Interstitial Zone, Argos, Bruxelles, Belgique
  - La Scène Française 1980-2008, Réfléchir Le Monde, Centrale Electrique, Bruxelles, Belgique
  - Sound Design for Future Films, Moderna Museet, Stockholm, Sweden
  - U-Turn, Quadriennal de Copenhagen, Denmark
  - Du Jardin au Cosmos, L'Espace d'Art Concret, Mouans-Sartoux, France
  - The Space of Man, Fondation Merz, Torino, Italy
  - Re-Make/Re-Model, Courtisane Film Festival, Gent, Belgium
  - Locked-In, Casino Luxembourg, Luxembourg
  - Voice and Void, Galerie Im Taxipalais, Innsbruck, Austria
  - Collection08, IAC Villeurbanne, France
  - Collateral 2, SESC Paulista, São Paulo, Brazil
  - Perform History, U-Turn at Overgaden, Copenhagen, Denmark
- 2007
  - Fiction Vs Reality, Centre d’Art Moderne, Fondation Calouste Gulbenkian, Lisbonne
  - Passages, Hommage à Walter Benjamin, Gandy Gallery Bratislava, Slovakia
  - Playback, Musée d’Art Moderne, Paris
  - Intrusions, Collection FMAC, Petit Palais, Paris
  - Voice and Void, The Aldrich Contemporary Art Museum (CT) Ridgefield, USA
  - On the limits of politics and possibilities of resistance, 04. Goteborg Biennale, Sweden
  - Collection, MAC VAL Musée d’Art Contemporain de Vitry, France
  - Poeziezomers, Watou, Belgium
  - Borderline-Moving Image, Beijing Center for Creativity, China
  - Think with the senses, Venice Biennale, Feel with the mind, Venise, Italy
  - Critical Foreground, New Langhton Arts San Francisco, US
  - The Hand, National Museum of Fine Arts, Riga, Latvia
  - On Peter Watkins, Galerie Martin Janda, Vienna, Austria
  - Air de Paris, Centre Georges Pompidou, Beaubourg, Paris
  - Centre of the Creative Universe: Liverpool and the Avant-Garde, TATE Liverpool, UK
  - Parabol Magazine #2, Vienna, Austria
  - Collateral, When Art looks at Cinema, Hangar Bicocca, Milan, Italy
- 2006
  - 02. Biennale of Sevilla, Spain
  - 06. Biennale of Gwangju, Korea
  - Datcha Project, Armenia Tell Me, Casino Luxembourg, Luxembourg
  - Human Games, Fondazione Pitti in Firenze, Italy
  - Undo Redo, Kunsthalle Fridericianum Kassel, Germany
  - Seven Minutes Before, Outdoor projection in Vercors, France
  - Negative Space, Extended, by Susane Burner Kunstmuseums Bonn, Germany
  - Satellites of Love, Witte de Whit, Rotterdam, Netherland
  - 25 Peaces, billboard project, Vienna, Austria
- 2005
  - Collection, MAC VAL Musée d’Art Contemporain de Vitry, France
  - Rencontres Internationales des Arts Multimédia, Marseille, France
  - Leçon Zéro, Galerie Chantal Crousel, Paris
  - Istmo, Galerie Vermelho, São Paulo, Brazil
  - Experiencing Duration, 08. Biennale de Lyon, France
  - Dialectic of Hope, 01. Biennale de Moscou, Russia
  - Tell Me, MNBA Québec, Canada
  - October Art Salon, Belgrade, Serbia
  - Multipistes, Palais des Beaux Arts, Bruxelles, Belgium
  - Nach Rokytník, EVN Collection, MUMOK Wien, Austria
  - England Land Marks, Greengrassi Gallery, London, UK
  - Remagine, Collection du FNAC, Musée d’Art Contemporain de Lyon, France
  - Collection, Macro-Mattatoio, Rome, Italy
  - Documentary Creations, Kunst museum, Luzern, Switzerland
  - Universal Experience, MCA Chicago, USA
- 2004
  - ReasonEmotion, 14. Biennale de Sydney, Australia
  - 03. Biennale de Berlin, Germany
  - 04. Biennale de Pontevedra, Spain
  - Communautés, IAC Villeurbanne, France
  - Mediterraneo, Macro-Mattatoio, Rome, Italy
  - Nuit Blanche, Paris, France Eblouissement, Jeu de Paume, Paris
- 2003
  - Geographies # 3, Galerie Chantal Crousel, Paris, France
  - Freezing Film, Gare de Lyon, Festival d’Automne, Paris, France
  - Through the Eye of a Needle, Galerie Chantal Crousel, Paris, France
  - Collective Exhibition, CRAC Sète, France
  - Embassy, Galleri F15, Moss, Norway
  - 2O ans des FRAC, Musée d’art Contemporain de Strasbourg, France
  - Moltitudini–Solitudini, Museion, Museo d’arte contemporanea Bolzano, Italy
  - No Ghost Just a Shell, Van Abbe Museum, Eindhoven, Pays-Bas / SF Moma, San Francisco, U.S.A
  - ARCO, Madrid, Spain
- 2002
  - No Ghost Just a Shell, Institute for Visual Culture, Cambridge, England
  - Toasting Agency at Openspace, Curated by Alexis Vaillant Piazza Duomo, Milan, Italy
  - No ghost Just a Shell, Kunsthalle Zürich, Switzerland / SF MoMA, San Francisco, USA
  - Migration de l’image, Erevan, Armenia
  - Haunted House, curated by Gabriel Lester, Outline, Amsterdam, Netherlands
  - Stories, Haus der Kunst, Munich, Germany
  - Less Ordinary, Artsonje Center, Seoul, Museum of Modern Art, Kyungju, Korea
- 2001
  - Traversées, ARC, Musée d'Art Moderne de la Ville de Paris
  - A comme Accident, Galerie Chantal Crousel, Paris
  - Rencontres Vidéo, Galerie Piazza Navona, Rome, Italy
- 2000
  - Institut d’art Contemporain de Villeurbanne, Residency in Die, Drôme, France
  - Soirée Nomade, Fondation Cartier pour l’Art Contemporain, Paris
- 1999
  - ThirtyFiveSecondsLater Interval Program, MAC Lyon, France
  - Icono Festival Printemps du Québec à Paris, Metro Stalingrad, France
- 1998
  - Collective Exhibition, Galerie Jennifer Flay, Paris, France
  - Junge Szene 98, Secession, Vienna, Austria
  - In Vitro, Glassbox, Paris, France
- 1997
  - Mobile TV, with Pierre Huygue, Le Consortium, Dijon, France
  - Histoires en Forme, Le Magasin, Grenoble, France
  - Galerie de Portraits, Collection FRAC Rhône-Alpes, France
  - 01. Biennale du Montenegro, Cetinje, Montenegro
- 1996
  - Bande Sonore pour un Film Potentiel, with Pierre Huyghe, Le Hall, ENBA Lyon, France
  - Arte Fiera di Bologna, Galerie Nuova Icona, Bologna, Italy
- 1995
  - Critique, Critique, Post-diplôme, Ecole Nationale des Beaux-Arts de Lyon, France
  - Cité de l’image, Lyon-Vaise / Galeria Nuova Icona, Venice, Italy
  - 08152758, Embarcadère, Lyon, France

== Public art ==
- 2003–2007: Le Récit Perpétuel, Talence
- 2008: Rosa Park Tribute, Collège Rosa Parks, Gentilly, Val-de-Marne
- 2008: Cosmoball, Abbaye de Maubuisson, Saint-Ouen-l'Aumône
- 2008: Philosophic DUB, Atelier de Création Radiophonique, France Culture, Paris
- 2008: Second Time & Second Sound, Piscine de Belleville, Berger & Anziutti Architectes, Paris
- 2009–2010: Cadence Modulaire, UPR – Hopital Saint-Antoine, Paris
- 2010–2018: Les Réverbères de la Mémoire, Armenian Génocide Memorial, Parc Trembley, Geneva

== Grants and residencies ==
- Prix Linossier, École nationale supérieure des beaux-arts de Lyon – Lyon, France, 1995
- Image en Mouvement CNC/DAP, French Pavillon XXVIe São Paulo Art Biennial – São Paulo, Brazil, 2000
- Institut d'art contemporain Villeurbanne – Die, France, 2000
- FIACRE, French Ministry of Culture – Paris, France, 2002
- CCA KitaKyushu – Fukuoka, Japan, 2003
- Villa Medici – Rome, Italy, 2003
- Artpace – San Antonio, USA, 2005
- October Art Salon Prize – Belgrade, Serbia, 2005
- CCA KitaKyushu – Fukuoka, Japan, 2007
- Montalvo Arts Center, Sally and Don Lucas Artist Program – San Francisco, USA, 2007
- Golden Lion for the Best National Pavilion (Republic of Armenia), Venice Biennale – Venice, Italy, 2015
- Marcel Duchamp Prize – Paris, France, 2015

== Books ==
- 2003: Kristale Company, Edition HYX, Paris
- 2005: Cosmograms, edited with Jean Christophe Royoux, Lukas & Sternberg, New York
- 2005: SlowMotion: from Slave to Valse, CCA Kitakyushu, Japan
- 2009: From The Voice to The Hand, edited by Cédric Schönwald and Elie During, Archibook, Paris
