= Tarik Kiswanson =

Swedish-born French visual artist

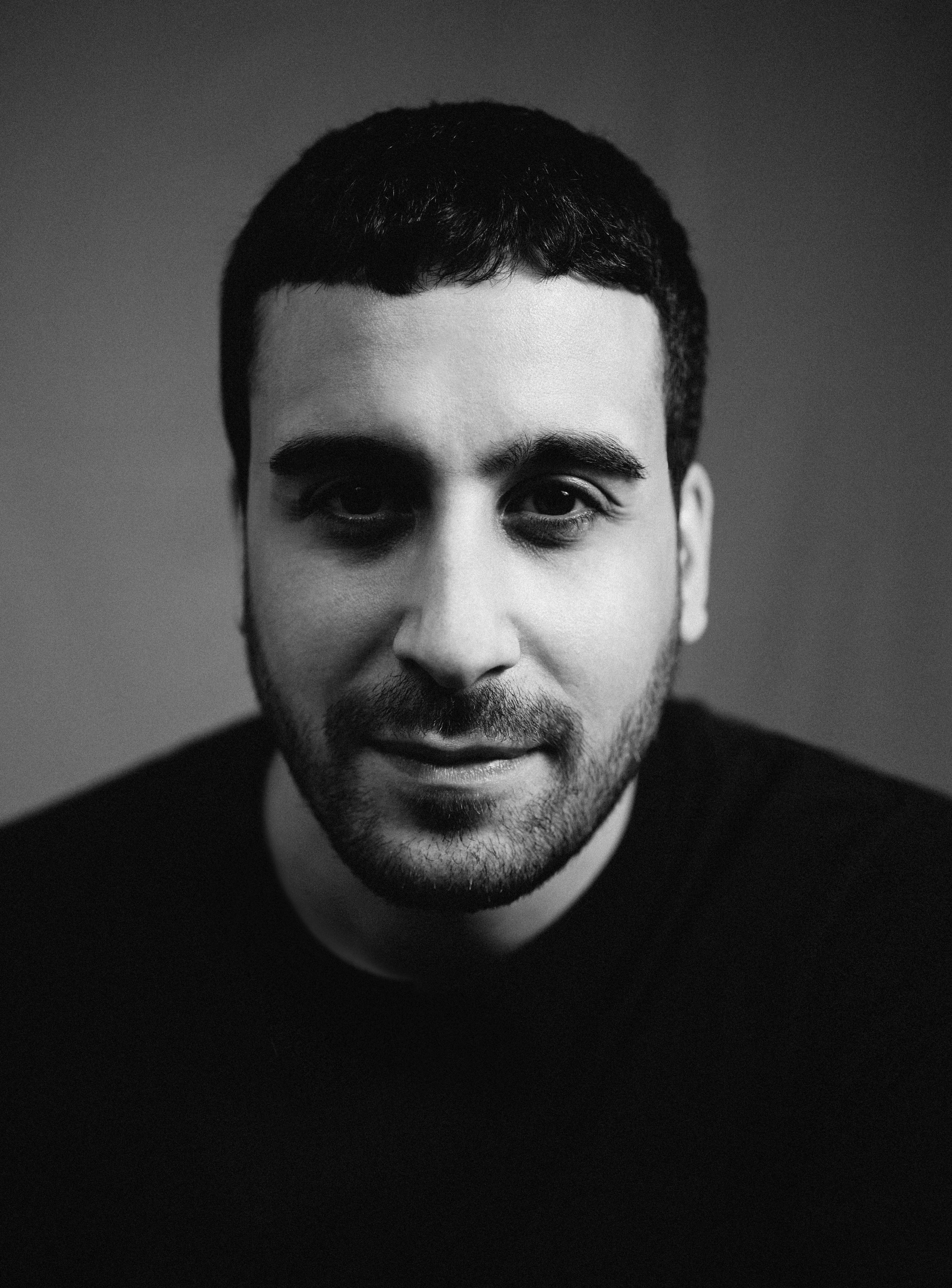
- Born: July 19, 1986 (age 40); Halmstad, Sweden
- Education: Central Saint Martins College of Art and Design; École nationale supérieure des beaux-arts
- Occupations: Sculptor, poet
- Awards: Marcel Duchamp Prize (2023)
- Website: tarikkiswanson.com

Tarik Kiswanson (born 19 July 1986) is a visual artist. He lives and works in Paris.

== Early life and education ==
Tarik Kiswanson was born in Halmstad, Sweden, in 1986. He comes from a Palestinian family that was exiled from Jerusalem, by way of Tripoli and Amman, before finally settling in Sweden in 1982.

At the age of 17, he moved to London to study at Central Saint Martin's School of Art. In 2010, he graduated with a Bachelor in Fine Arts and moved to Paris to continue his studies at the École Nationale Supérieure des Beaux-Arts de Paris and graduated in 2014.

== Work ==
For two decades, Tarik Kiswanson has engaged with themes of loss, memory, and regeneration through an expansive interdisciplinary practice. His works are shaped by legacies of displacement and transformation, which are essential to both their form and the modes of sensing they produce. While retaining an attachment to the intimate and personal, his practice extends to address universal concerns and broader historical, political and social narratives of rupture and reconstruction. His art engages with the architecture of the spaces in which it is exhibited, transcending conventional modes of representation to create holistic experiences.

Tarik Kiswanson’s practice engages with material culture and the mnemonic capacities of objects, interrogating the enduring aftermath of war and movement across varied historical and geopolitical contexts. His projects examine how artifacts produced during or in the aftermath of trauma can be recontextualized as sites of resilience and collective historical consciousness. By exploring the language of objects, Kiswanson’s archaeology of memory gives voice to the unspeakable. Rather than reconciling the contradictions of our History, he makes them visible, underscoring their reverberations across generations and geographies.

He is the winner of the 2023 Marcel Duchamp Prize.

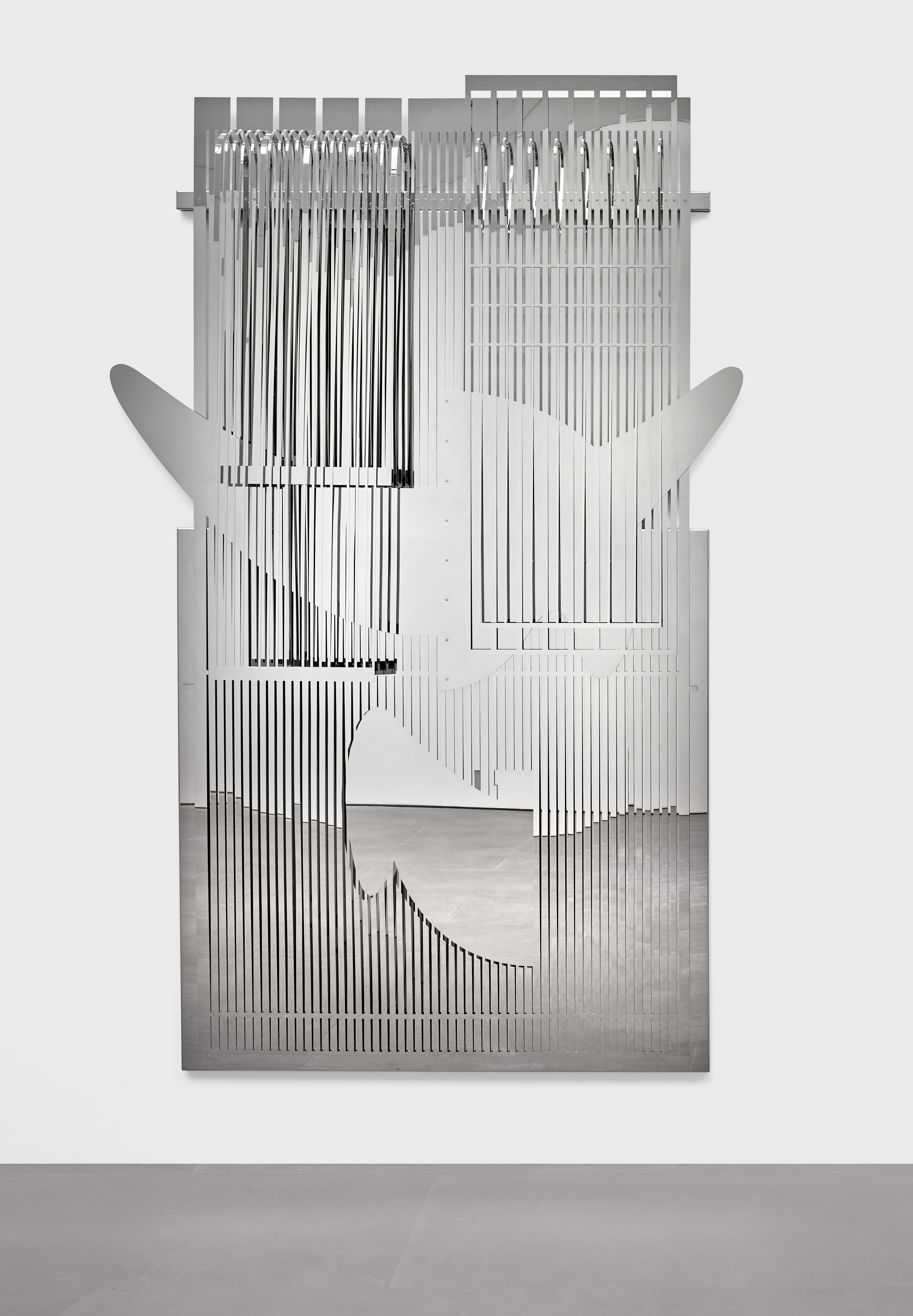
1951 (The Weavers' Machines), 2016

== Exhibitions ==
=== Solo exhibitions (selection) ===
- Henraux International Sculpture Prize 2024, Henraux Foundation
- A Century, Portikus (2024)
- Marcel Duchamp Prize 2023, Centre Pompidou (2023)
- Afterwards, Salzburger Kunstverein, Salzbourg, Austria (2023)
- Becoming, Bonniers Konsthall, Stockholm, Sweden (2023)
- Nido, Museo Tamayo, Mexico City, Mexico (2023)
- Anamnesis, M HKA - Musée d'Art contemporain d'Anvers (2022)
- Nest, Sfeir-Semler Gallery, Beyrouth, Lebanon (2022)
- Nest, Hallands Konstmuseum, Halmstad, Sweden (2022)
- Surge, carlier I gebauer, Berlin, Germany (2021)
- Mirrorbody, Carré d'Art, Nîmes, France (2020)
- Come of age, Fondation d'entreprise Ricard, Paris, France (2018)
- Father Form, carlier | gebauer, Berlin, Germany (2017)
- Ongoing Reflection, Collège des Bernardins, Paris, France (2016)

=== Group exhibitions (selection) ===
- Form of the surrounding futures, Gothenburg International Biennial for Contemporary Art (2023)
- READ, Kunsthalle Praha, Praha, Czechia (2023)
- Manifesto of fragility, 16e Biennale d'art contemporain de Lyon, France (2022)
- Living In This Exquisite Corpse, Ambassade de France, Berne, Switzerland (2021)
- In The Open, The Common Guild, Glasgow, United-Kingdom (2021)
- Hi-storytelling, Sfeir-Semler Gallery, Hambourg, Germany (2021)
- Immortality, Ural biennial, Ekaterinburg, Rusia (2019)
- As deep as I could remember, as fas as I could see, Performa 19 biennial, New York, United-States (2019)
- Today will happen, Biennale de Gwangju, South Korea (2018)

== Publications ==
Exhibition catalogues

- Nest, Hallands Konstmuseum, Mousse Publishing, 2022
- Mirrorbody, Carré d’Art - Musée d’Art contemporain de Nîmes, DISTANZ, 2021

Poetry books

- The Window, JBE Books, 2022

=== Artist's book ===
- Becoming, Dilecta, 2023
