= Vittorio Santoro =

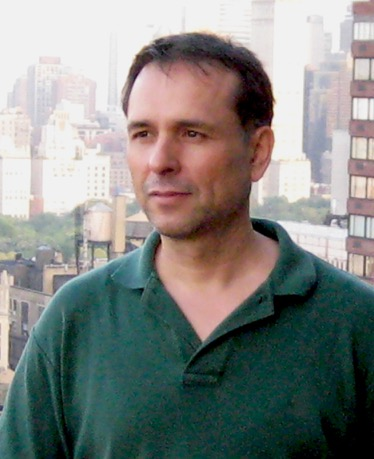
Vittorio Santoro, New York, 2011

Vittorio Santoro (born 3 September 1962) is an Italian-Swiss visual artist. He lives in Paris and Zürich. He is primarily known for his multimedia approach including installations, audio works, sculptures, works on paper, real-time activities and his artist books.

== Education ==
Essentially an autodidact, Santoro has attended the International Center of Photography (NYC) and the programs at Watermill Art Center with Robert Wilson (Long Island, NY).

== Work ==
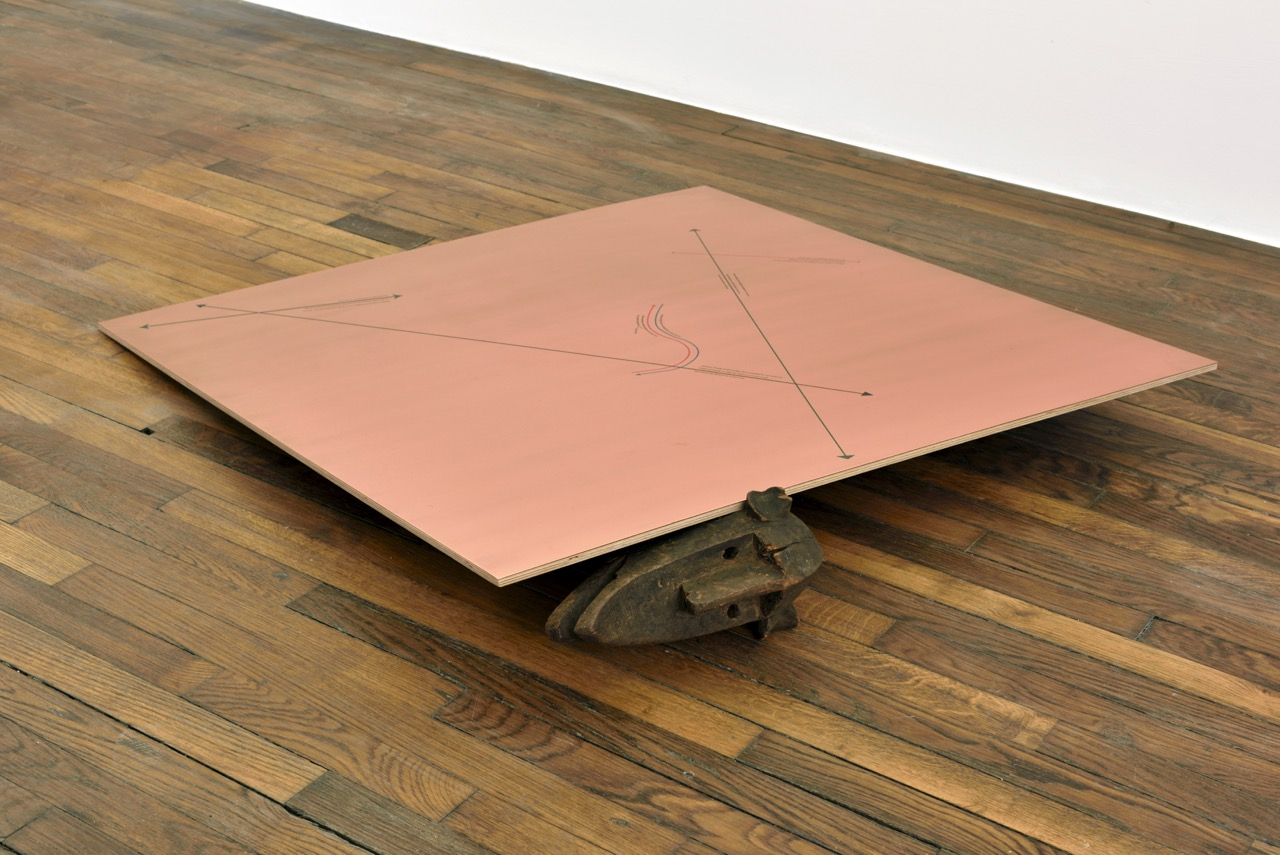
Plateau (Antiméridien/Postméridien), 2016, Sculpture

Santoro initially developed a literary practice in Italian (his parents emigrated from Sicily, Italy, to Switzerland before his birth). In 1985, he published the collection of poems entitled La Voce e le Mani, Progetto per una poesia inumana (Lalli Editore, Poggibonsi). His work with the medium of language continues to this day and was even reinforced after meeting with artist Jenny Holzer in the early 1990s. In the mid-1990s, he increasingly turned to photography as a means of expression. In close collaboration with the American writer Paul Bowles, he published The Time of Friendship / Ten Photographs (Memory/Cage Editions, Zürich, 1995). He then gradually expanded the spectrum of media towards sculpture, installation and video/film. Images, space, signs, sounds and language are intertwined in works such as F. Dostoyevsky: C. and P., Page 67 (Penguin Popular Classics), divided vertically, 2007/2011, Untitled (Mask), 2007, Monologism As Poetry, 2009, Reciprocal Scrutiny (bordereau), 2009, Gagarin, I-II, 2012, Good-bye Darkness, IV, 2010, and In/Voluntary Movement Diagram (Josef K.), 2014.

His works are based in everyday observations, but go beyond them to show latent historical, aesthetic, sociopolitical, or even metaphysical realities. His characteristically intricate visual sensibility conceals a tension between the referential possibilities of objects and the choreographic nature of their placement in context. For each work Santoro chooses specific ways to manipulate conventions to desired effects, believing that creativity is an ongoing process of continual change and reaction.

In an artist statement for the installation Reciprocal Scrutiny (bordereau), 2009, shown at Galerie Xippas in Paris, the artist has stated: “I like to think that the different elements of the work will serve as triggers and incite the viewer to form connections between the literary, political, historical and perceptual sources. And, furthermore, encourage a rigorous parlay between one's own subjectivity and an 'impassive' art object. This interplay between abstract data, geometric and linguistic forms, historical facts and fictional information can be negotiated and interpreted in any number of ways. I would enjoy that the piece would dilate like a web of associations, interferences and allusions. The centre of the project space remains empty and my interest is to explore what, in this vacuum, might now be possible.”

In 2017, it was nominated for the prestigious Prix Marcel Duchamp 2017. He proposes the installation Une porte doit être ouverte ou non fermée, 2017, presented at the Centre Pompidou in Paris. It is a sort of initiation ritual itinerary in two parts: one at the museum, the other disseminated through elements in the city. The viewer is invited to experience the piece in a quest for its relationship to the world and to itself.

His work is represented by Counter Space, Zürich.

== Selected works ==
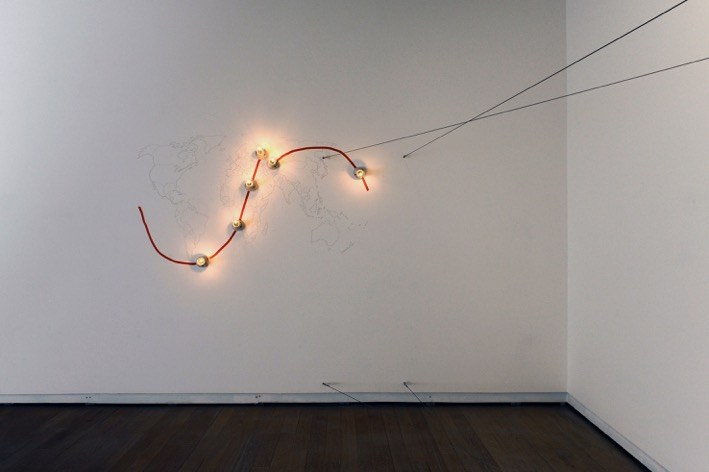
Gagarin I (Impenetrable Corner-108 Minutes A Day), 2012, Installation

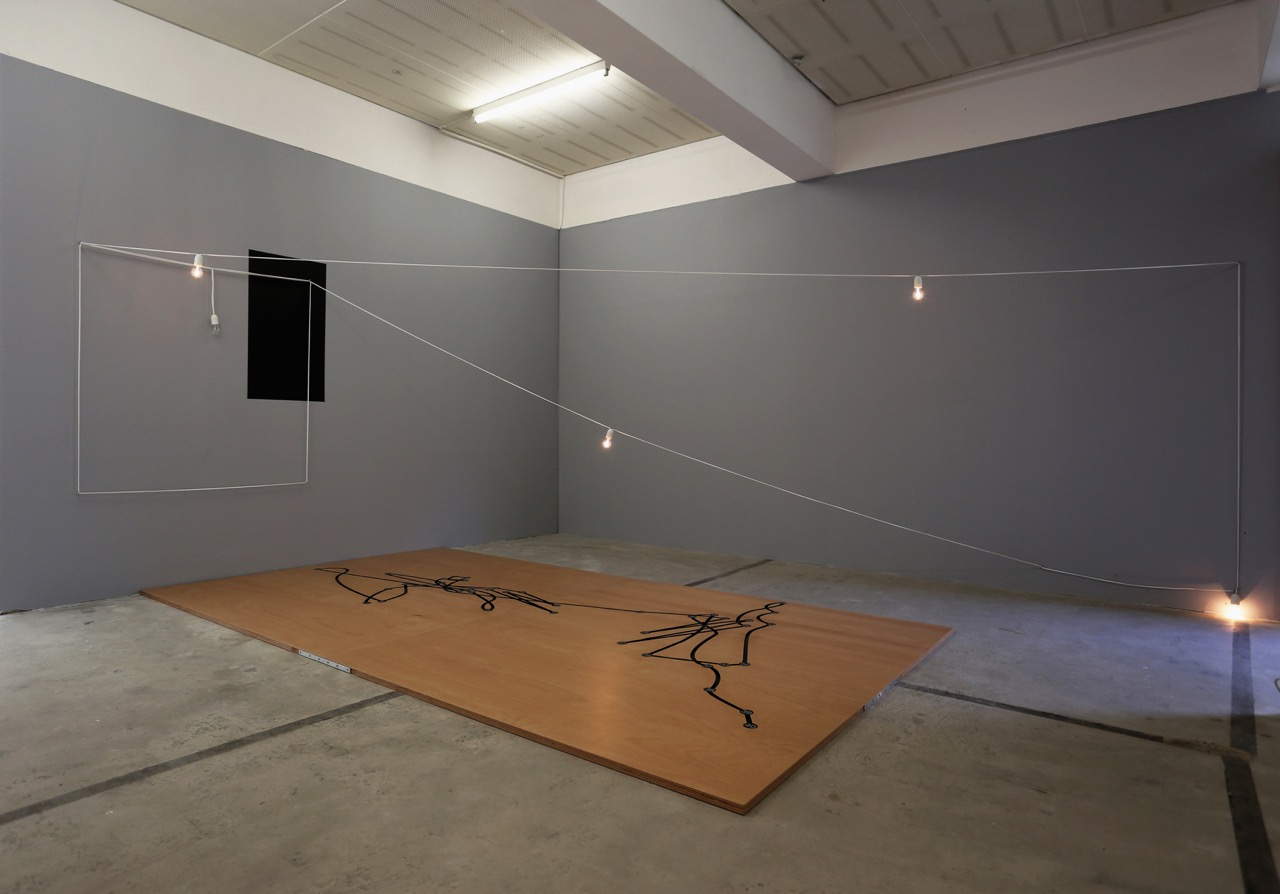
In-Voluntary Movement Diagram (Josef K.), 2013, Installation

- Interiors (Veterans' Cars), I-VII, 2026 – Installation
- Pulleys (Put in, Take Out/The Unanswered Question), 2024 – Installation
- Persona (Chair/Megaphone), 2020 – Installation
- Expire (Josef K.'s Relation Diagram to 17 of the Characters in The Trial), 2019 – Wall sculpture
- We Stare, We Talk…October 2018–March 2019, 2018-2019 – Time-based text work
- Memories of a Bird, I-IV, 2017 – Sculptures
- Beginning/Conclusion, 2016 – Sculpture
- Plateau (Antiméridien/Postméridien), 2016 – Sculpture
- Giovanni Drogo's Surreal Delay (Pulsar CP19191), I-IV, 2016 – Photo work
- Pulleys, I, 2016 – Installation
- "Avant" se trouve après "après", 2016 – Sculpture
- Mirror of the Sea (Hangzhou I + II), 2015 – Sculpture
- In/Voluntary Movement Diagram (Josef K.), 2014 – Installation
- Untitled (Pier Paolo Pasolini), 2013–14 – Installation
- A Game of Mental Chess (Raskolnikov/Porfiry Petrovich), 2013 – Sculpture
- Une certaine idée de l'histoire de mon père, I-IV, 2013 – Installation
- Whether It, 2012 – Neon-Installation
- 00:00:1.20s, 2012 – Sculpture
- Searching For... (One Day and Night in Amsterdam), 2012 – Photo work
- Gagarin II (Sphinx/31 January 1962), 2012 – Sculpture
- Gagarin I (Impenetrable Corner/108 Minutes a Day), 2012 – Installation
- How Could 'Godot' End?, II (Spinning Top/Toupie), 2012 – Work on paper
- Opening Moves (Valuable Qualities of the Mind to be Acquired as to Become Habits), 2011 – Sculpture
- This Impact Leads Into...February–July 2011 (Origami/Sphinx), 2011 – Installation
- The World Was Full of Objects and Events and Sounds That Are Known to be Real..., 2011 – Group of collages
- F. Dostoyevsky: C. and P., page 67 (Penguin Popular Classics), Divided Vertically, 2007/2011 – Installation
- Opening Moves (Valuable Qualities of the Mind to be Acquired As to Become Habits), 2011 – Sculpture
- Good-bye Darkness, IV – Elephants Don't Play Chess (A Loose Conversation on Some Aspects of BWV 1001–1006 with Kerwin Rolland), 2010 – Installation
- Man Leaving Harbour on a Ship (in a Room), 2009–10 – Audio installation
- Reciprocal Scrutiny (bordereau), 2009 – Installation
- Monologism As Poetry, 2009 – Outdoor large neon-Installation
- Visionaries&Voyeurs, II, 2009 – Video
- Untitled (Mask), 2007 – Installation
- Good-bye Darkness, II, 2005 – Sculpture
- How Can I / Make It Right, March–August 2005, 2005 – Diptych, Work on paper
- Plate (for Paul), 2000/2003 – Sculpture

== Selected exhibitions ==
- TEMPESTA, Fondation Fernet Branca, Saint-Louis (F), 2026 (group)
- Nychthemeron, Nina Horvitz Galerie, Berlin, 2025 (solo)
- Geister/Ghosts, Kunstmuseum Basel, Basel, 2025 (group)
- Isomorphe Diffusion (Isomorphic Diffusion), MATERIAL, Art Space, Zurich, 2024 (solo)
- Raushing to Take Sides/Reflection on The Right Side to Take, The Showroom by Xavier Fischer, Zurich, 2024 (solo)
- "Pour lui le poison et le contrepoison étaient toujours dans une seule ampoule", Workroom of the Kerenidis/Pepe Collection, Paris, 2023 (solo)
- Geister/Ghosts, Kunstmuseum Basel, Basel, 2025 (group)
- Isomorphe Diffusion (Isomorphic Diffusion), MATERIAL, Art Space, Zurich, 2024 (solo)
- Raushing to Take Sides/Reflection on The Right Side to Take, The Showroom by Xavier Fischer, Zurich, 2024 (solo)
- TIME–From Dürer to Bonvicini, Kunsthaus Zürich, Zurich, 2023 (group)
- "Pour lui le poison et le contrepoison étaient toujours dans une seule ampoule", Workroom of the Kerenidis/Pepe Collection, Paris, 2023 (solo)
- Rhinocéros/Bérenger, Kesner Gesellschaft, Hannover, 2022 (solo)
- Ambiguities/Affirmations, Vittorio Santoro: Works on paper, Publications, Artist's Books, Saint-Martin Bookshop&Project Room, Bruxelles, 2023 (solo)
- Sculpture/Sculpture, Kunstmuseum Luzern, Lucerne, 2020 (solo)
- Rhinocéros/Bérenger, Kesner Gesellschaft, Hannover, 2022 (solo)
- Ambiguities/Affirmations, Vittorio Santoro: Works on paper, Publications, Artist's Books, Saint-Martin Bookshop&Project Room, Bruxelles, 2023 (solo)
- Sculpture/Sculpture, Kunstmuseum Luzern, Lucerne, 2020 (solo)
- Four Speakers' Corners (For Twenty-Four Hours), Yvon Lambert, Project Room, Paris, 2020 (solo)
- Vittorio Santoro chez Florence Loewy/Books : une sélection de livres d'artiste et d'éditions, Florence Loewy/Books, Paris, 2020 (solo)
- Travaux sur Papier, 2008–2019, Yvon Lambert, Project Room, Paris, 2019 (solo)
- Pulleys, I & The Supposed Half of a Day &..., Galerie Cortex Athletico, Paris, 2016 (solo)
- 108 Minutes A Day (Gagarin), Museum of Contemporary Art, Pavilion, Shanghai, 2015 (solo)
- Europe–The Future of History, Kunsthaus Zürich, 2015 (group)
- In/Voluntary Movement Diagram (Josef K.) And Other Works, Oonagh Young Gallery, Dublin, 2015 (solo)
- Le grand paysage (pour un jour), Galerie Jérôme Poggi, Paris (solo)
- 3 July 1913: Unexpectedly Arrested By Two Unidentified Agents From An Unspecified Agency On Unspecified Charges, Counter Space, Zürich, 2014 (solo)
- I Think It Rains (Quadrilogy 2), 1a space and Burger Collection, Hong Kong, 2013 (group)
- Correspondences, Espace culturel Louis Vuitton, Paris, 2013 (group)
- Vittorio Santoro, Filmic Works (screening), Centre Pompidou, Paris, 2012 (solo)
- Owls Move Their Entire Head to Change Views, Fondation d'enterprise Ricard, Paris, 2012 (solo)
- Le Nouveau Festival, Centre Pompidou, Paris, 2012 (group)
- Le vingt-quatre heures, Galerie Campagne Première, Berlin, 2011 (solo)
- Que tout le monde vive comme si personne "ne savait" : some script works, Rosascape, Paris, 2011 (solo)
- Visionaries & Voyeurs, Irish Museum of Modern Art, Dublin, 2011 (solo)
- Conflicting Tales (Quadrilogy 1), Burger Collection, Berlin, 2009 (group)
- La chambre de Marlow, Galerie Xippas, Paris, 2009 (solo)
- Shifting Identity, Kunsthaus Zürich/CAC, Vilnius, 2008 (group)
- The Truth About Your Own Tolerance for Cruelty, Cortex Athletico, Bordeaux, 2007 (solo)
- Learn to Read, Tate Modern, London, 2006 (group)
- It's All In Your Mind/C'est tout dans ma tête, Yvon Lambert, Project Room, Paris, 2003 (solo)

== Collections ==
- Migros Museum für Gegenwartskunst, Zürich, Switzerland
- Centre Pompidou, Musée national d'art moderne, Paris, France
- Museo de Arte Contemporãnea Armando Martins, Lisbon, Portugal
- Kunsthaus Zürich, Zürich, Switzerland
- Graphische Sammlung ETH/ETH's Prints and Drawings Collection, Zürich, Switzerland
- CAPC, Musée d'art contemporain, Bordeaux, France
- Kunstmuseum Bern, Bern, Switzerland
- CNAP – Centre national des arts plastiques, Paris, France
- FNAC – Fonds national d'art contemporain, Paris, France
- Frac Acquitaine, Bordeaux, France
- Burger Collection, Hong Kong, China
- Sammlung Nobel, Zürich, Switzerland
- Swiss National Library, Prints and Drawing Collection, Berne, Switzerland
- Art Collection of the City of Zürich, Switzerland
- Art Collection of the Canton of Zürich, Switzerland
- Art Collection of the Swiss Federation, Switzerland

== Publications ==
- By the artist
  - Santoro, Vittorio. 2019. Juste avant ou juste après, Yvon Lambert, Paris & Stolen Books, Lisbon. Screen printed cardboard box containing a catalogue with a text by Daniel Kurjakovic (E/F), 48 pages, unp. and other items.
  - Santoro, Vittorio. 2016. Pulleys, I & The Supposed Half of a Day &..., Galerie Cortex Athletico, Paris. 82 pages, all images in color, texts by Monika Marczuk, Manuel Cirauqui and Vittorio Santoro; French/English (monograph)
  - Santoro, Vittorio. 2016. Until Nothing Happens, I-V. Text by Pierre Vialle, Out Of The Dark, Zürich/Maison des Arts de Malakoff, Paris. 8 pages with 5 images insert. Text F/E (artist brochure)
  - Santoro, Vittorio. 2015. 108 Minutes A Day (Gagarin), MoCA Shanghai, Shanghai. Text Chinese/Engl. (artist catalogue)
  - Santoro, Vittorio. 2014/15. In/Voluntary Movement Diagram (Josef K) And Related Works, Out Of The Dark, Zürich/Dublin. Text E (artist catalogue)
  - Santoro, Vittorio. 2014. Four Speakers' Corners, I, self-published, Paris. Text F (artist brochure)
  - Santoro, Vittorio. 2012. D(a)edalus, My Father's Horse, Taken From The Mill, A Tourné En Round Autour D'une Statue de..., Les presses du réel, Dijon. Texts French/English (monograph)
  - Santoro, Vittorio. 2012. Silence Destroys Consequences, limited edition, Yvon Lambert, Paris, 120 pages. Texts F (artist book)
  - Santoro, Vittorio. 2010. Man Leaving Harbour on a Ship (in a Room), self-published, Paris, 2010 (artist book)
  - Santoro, Vittorio. 2006. Everything's Not Lost, Revolver Verlag, Frankfurt a. Main. Texts German/French/English (monograph)
  - Santoro, Vittorio. 2003. It's all in your mind/C'est tout dans ma tête, Memory/Cage Editions, Zürich. Texts F/E/G (artist book)
  - Santoro, Vittorio. 2000. Imagine. You are Landing. Memory/Cage Editions, Zürich. Text E (artist book)
  - Santoro, Vittorio (in collaboration with Robert Wilson). 1997. RWWM, Memory/Cage Editions, Zürich. Texts E (artist book)
  - Santoro, Vittorio. 1997. Untitled (Train), 12 Photographs for a room, Memory/Cage Editions, Zürich. Text E/G (artist book)
  - Santoro, Vittorio (in collaboration with Paul Bowles). 1995. The Time of Friendship/Ten Photographs, Memory/Cage Editions, Zürich. Texts E (artist book)
- About the artist
  - Marzo, Alan. 2020. Le temps de l'esprit face à l'esprit du temps – Vittorio Santoro ou le Sisyphe du monde du monde de l'art, in Les Cahiers du MNAM, Paris, N° 150, hiver 2019/2020, pp. 66–77
  - Kurjaković, Daniel. 2019. Sealed Within. In Vittorio Santoro: Juste avant ou juste après, Yvon Lambert, Paris & Stolen Books, Lisbon, 2019, 48 pages, unp.
  - Marczuk, Monika. 2016. And the Time, Even longer, Incomparably Longer. In: Vittorio Santoro, Pulleys, I & The Supposed Half of a Day &..., pp. 9–10, Galerie Cortex Athletico, Paris
  - Long, Declan. 2015. Vittorio Santoro at Oonagh Young Gallery, Dublin, in ARTFORUM, September 2015, Vol. 54, Nr. 1, p. 397
  - Domenech, Théodora. 2014. Le grand paysage (pour un jour). Interview with Vittorio Santoro. In: Four Speakers' Corners, I, catalogue, self-published, Paris.
  - Kurjaković, Daniel. 2013. Speaking to the Desert: Vittorio Santoro's ‘Une certaine idée de l'histoire de mon père, I-IV'. In: ANNUAL Magazine, N°6, pp. 174–183, Paris.
  - Geldard, Rebecca. 2012. Synaptic Events (In Slow Motion). In: Vittorio Santoro, D(a)edalus, My Fathers's Horse, Taken From The Mill, A tourné en rond autour d'une statue de..., exhibition catalogue, pp. 7–11, Les presses du réel, Dijon Fondation d'enterprise Ricard, Paris.
  - Illouz, Audrey. 06/2012. Vittorio Santoro. In: artpress, N°390, pp. 58–60, Paris.
  - Khazam, Rahma. 2012. "Vittorio Santoro interviewed by Rahma Khazam". In: ARTFORUM online
  - Kurjaković, Daniel. 01/2011. Voice Puller. In: VOLUME. A contemporary Art Journal About Sound, N°2, pp. 30–41, Paris.
  - Cirauqui, Manuel. 2010. Eclipse (Vittorio Santoro). In: 20/27, revue de textes critiques sur l'art, N°4, pp. 97–113, Edition M19: Paris.
  - Lebovici, Élisabeth. 05/2007. A Few Words About Words... Une conversation avec Vittorio Santoro. In: Le-beau-vice, blog, Paris.
  - Groot, Paul. 2006. The Ambiguity of The Radio in 'The Radio'. In: Vittorio Santoro, Everything's Not Lost, Revolver, pp. 31–34, Frankfurt a. Main.
