= Katinka Bock =

German artist (b. 1976)

Katinka Bock (born 1976) is a German sculptor and visual artist. She lives and works in Paris and Berlin.

== Early life ==
Katinka Bock was born in Frankfurt am Main and studied sculpture and visual arts at the Weißensee Academy of Art Berlin, receiving her diploma in 2002. She was a master student under Inge Mahn until 2004, at the Academy of Fine Arts in Berlin-Weissensee. She received a post-graduate degree from the École nationale supérieure des beaux-arts de Lyon in 2005.

She is represented by the Galerie Jocelyn Wolff in Paris, Meyer Riegger of Berlin and Karlsruhe and Greta Meert in Brussels.

== Artistic Work ==
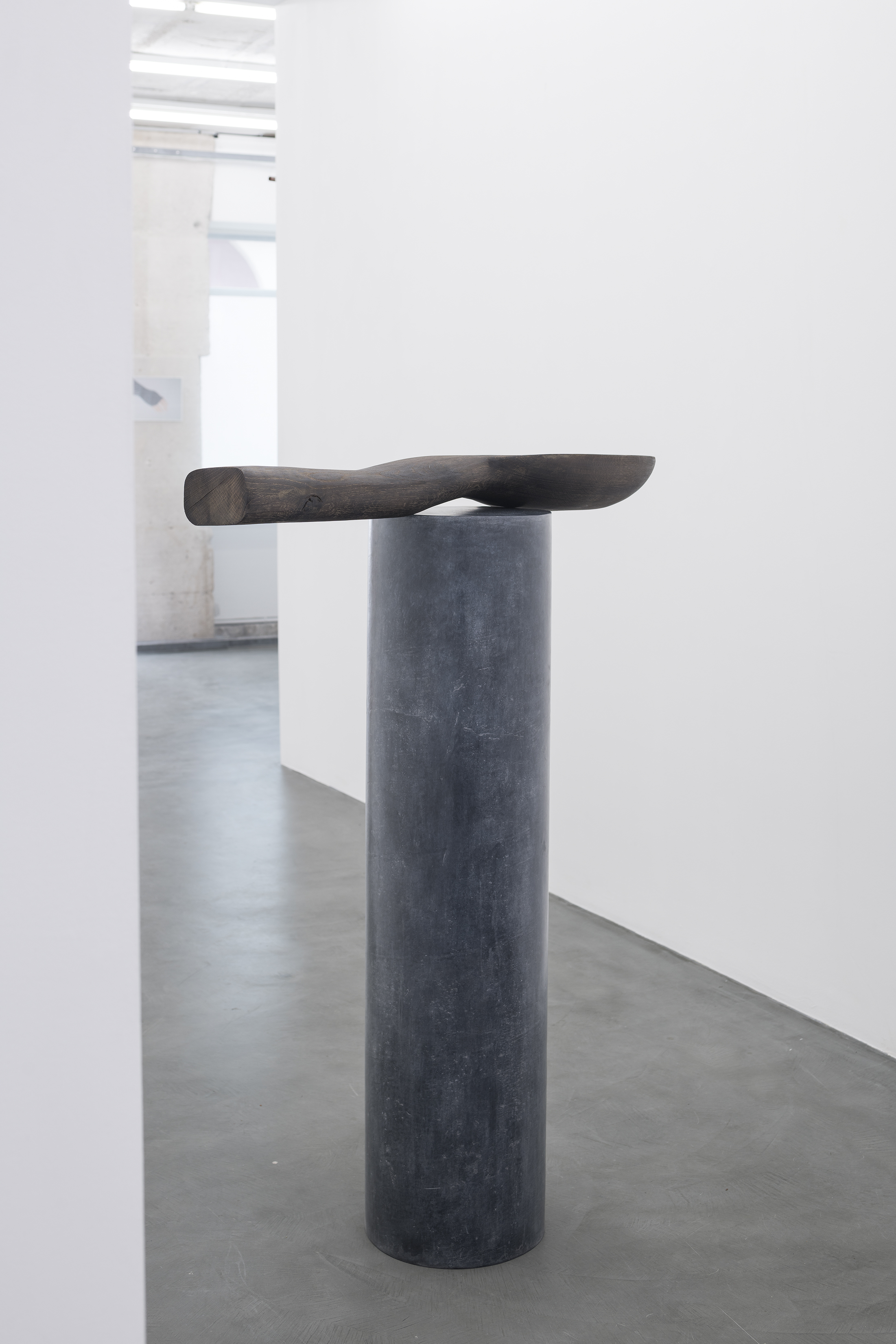
Katinka Bock, T-toxic, 2019, oak wood & bronze, 130 × 112 × 30 cm

Katinka Bock’s oeuvre is predominantly focused on the transformative processes that take place when confronting natural and man-made elements, exploring the process through which each aspect transforms the other. Katinka Bock explores the relationship between urban landscapes and natural elements, placing her works in open spaces to face the elements, often imprinting her experiences through her materials. Some of her works are balanced in precarious such as the dynamic yet unsteadily placed mobiles resting on lemons in Farben dieses Meeres Balance (zweifach), Bock’s pieces generate and inhabit their own spaces and environments, actively interacting with and on occasion changing them.

Much of her work is based on fluid movements – instead of breaking, chiseling or hacking, her materials are shaped, folded, cut, or simply placed in a context-specific constellation or construction. Bock prefers to integrate natural materials such as leather, wood, stone, fabric, plaster, ceramics or graphite, as well as individual found or otherwise unusual objects. Katinka Bock’s repeated use of water in her works is not as much significant for the physical effects it produces, as it is for the symbolism it is charged with. Redirecting already occurring sources of water within both urban and rural landscapes, she builds structures that create a symbiotic relationship between the piece and the context in which it is placed. Incorporating rain water, water from public fountains, water from rivers or from the sea, the sculptures are animated, altered or adapted to the flow of the spaces which they interact with. One such example is the piece Hysteros, in which a wooden module placed in a Toulousian exhibition space is connected by a cable to the branch of a tree standing on a riverbed outside. The structure confined to the gallery moves up and down, reacting to the movement of the water current.

At times influenced by their surroundings, Katinka’s works often exist in a highly site-specific context. Based on fluid and shifting elements tied to a certain context, their final form is often difficult to predict and entirely organic. Some works, such as Winter or Seechamäleon are transported from their previous locations, existing between two different temporal experiences, marked by their past in an uncannily human manner. They inhabit the spaces in which they are placed by the artist, being influenced by their surroundings while also changing them themselves independently of human influence.

Similarly, Katinka Bock’s work often integrates living natural elements into the physical structures of her installations or sculptures. Creating a symbiotic relationship between the changing and growing fauna and the static man-made construction cast from bronze, trees or plants become an integral part of her sculptural repertoire and ensure that the works are constantly moving, changing and quite literally growing. The sculpture titled La Grande Fontaine, which can be seen on the tracks of the tramway line 3b near Porte d’Aubervilliers in Paris since 2013, is one of such pieces, in which a cherry tree occupies the center of a lengthy sculpture out of bronze, granite and ceramics.
