= List of contemporary artists =

This is a list of artists who create contemporary art, i.e., those whose peak of activity can be situated somewhere between the 1970s (the advent of postmodernism) and the present day. Artists on this list meet the following criteria:

- The person is regarded as an important figure or is widely cited by his/her peers or successors.
- The person is known for originating a significant new concept, theory or technique.
- The person has created, or played a major role in co-creating, a significant or well-known work, or collective body of work, that has been the subject of an independent book or feature-length film, or of multiple independent periodical articles or reviews.
- The person's work either (a) has become a significant monument, (b) has been a substantial part of a significant exhibition, (c) has won significant critical attention, or (d) is represented within the permanent collections of several notable galleries or museums, or had works in many significant libraries.

== A ==
- Martine Aballéa (born 1950), installation artist
- Marina Abramović (born 1946), performance artist
- Vito Acconci (1940–2017), installation and performance artist
- Rita Ackermann (born 1968), artist
- Bas Jan Ader (1942–1979), conceptual artist
- Eija-Liisa Ahtila (born 1959), video artist
- Peggy Ahwesh (born 1954), video artist
- Chantal Akerman (1950–2015), filmmaker
- Vikky Alexander (born 1959), installation artist
- Edward Allington (1951–2017), sculptor
- Francis Alÿs (born 1959), conceptual artist
- El Anatsui (born 1944), sculptor and installation artist
- Laurie Anderson (born 1947), performance artist
- Lennart Anderson (1928–2015), painter
- Carl Andre (1935–2024), sculptor
- Janine Antoni (born 1964), sculptor and installation artist
- Ida Applebroog (1929–2023), painter
- Nobuyoshi Araki (born 1940), photographer
- Diane Arbus (1923–1971), photographer
- Siah Armajani (1939–2020), sculptor
- Arman (1928–2005), sculptor
- John Armleder (born 1948), performance artist, painter, sculptor, critic, and curator
- Art & Language, art collective
- Richard Artschwager (1923–2013), sculptor and painter
- Roy Ascott (born 1934), new media artist
- Frank Auerbach (1931–2024), painter
- Sofia Areal (born 1960), painter

== B ==
- Francis Bacon (1909–1992), painter
- Jo Baer (1929–2025), painter
- John Baldessari (1931–2020), conceptual artist
- Balthus (1908–2001), painter
- Banksy (born 1974), graffiti artist
- Fiona Banner (born 1966), installation artist and sculptor
- Matthew Barney (born 1967), filmmaker
- Will Barnet (1911–2012), painter
- Artur Barrio (born 1945), interactive artist
- Bo Bartlett (born 1955), painter
- Jennifer Bartlett (1941–2022), painter
- Georg Baselitz (1938–2026), painter, sculptor
- Jean-Michel Basquiat (1960–1988), painter
- Noah Becker (born 1970), painter
- Vanessa Beecroft (born 1969), performance artist
- Larry Bell (born 1939), sculptor
- Maurice Benayoun (born 1957), media artist
- Lynda Benglis (born 1941), sculptor
- Ib Benoh (born 1947), painter, sculptor, printmaker, digital media artist, poet and scholar
- Danelle Bergstrom (born 1957), painter
- José Bernal (1925–2010), painter and sculptor
- Joseph Beuys (1921–1986), sculptor, performance artist, installation artist
- Ashley Bickerton (1959-2022), mixed-media artist
- Janet Biggs (born 1959), video and performance artist
- Dara Birnbaum (born 1946), video and installation artist
- Ned Bittinger (born 1951), painter
- Ronald Bladen, (1918–1988), sculptor
- David Blatherwick (born 1960), painter and video artist
- Guy Bleus (born 1950), performance artist, mail art
- Mark Bloch (artist) (born 1956), performance artist, mail art
- Mel Bochner (1940-2025), conceptual artist, painter and print-maker
- Christian Boltanski (1944–2021), sculptor, photographer, painter and film maker
- Alighiero Boëtti (1940–1994), conceptual artist
- Maurizio Bolognini (born 1952), post-conceptual media artist
- Henry Bond (born 1966), writer, photographer and visual artist
- Christine Borland (born 1965), sculptor
- Michaël Borremans (born 1963), painter
- Eberhard Bosslet (born 1953), sculptor, installation artist
- Fernando Botero (1932–2023), painter
- Jack Boul (born 1927), painter, printmaker and sculptor
- Louise Bourgeois (1911–2010), sculptor and installation artist
- Mark Bradford (born 1961), painter
- Robert J Brawley (1937–2006), painter
- Candice Breitz (born 1972), video artist
- Stuart Brisley (born 1933), performance artist
- Marcel Broodthaers (1924–1976), poet, filmmaker and artist
- Glenn Brown (born 1966)
- Tania Bruguera (born 1968), installation and performance artist
- Fatma Bucak (born 1984), performance and installation artist
- Angela Bulloch (born 1966), installation artist
- Deborah Butterfield (born 1949), sculptor
- Chris Burden (1946–2015), performance artist, sculptor, and installation artist
- Jack Bush (1909–1977), painter
- Gerard Byrne (born 1969), installation artist

== C ==
- Sophie Calle (born 1953), conceptual artist
- Nuno de Campos (born 1969), painter
- Janet Cardiff (born 1957), installation artist
- Gerard Caris (1925–2025), sculptor
- Norman Carlberg (1928–2018), sculptor
- Gillian Carnegie (born 1971), painter
- Anthony Caro (1924–2013), sculptor
- Antonio Caro (1950–2021), painter and conceptual artist
- Nicolas Carone (1917–2010), painter, sculptor
- James Casebere (born 1953), photographer
- Maurizio Cattelan (born 1960), sculptor
- Nick Cave (born 1959), performance artist and sculptor
- John Cederquist (born 1946), sculptor
- Vija Celmins (born 1938), painter
- Saint Clair Cemin (born 1951), sculptor
- John Chamberlain (1927–2011), sculptor
- Suki Chan (born 1977), video and installation artist
- Hsia-Fei Chang (born 1973), performance and installation artist
- Gordon Cheung, (born 1975), contemporary artist
- Jake and Dinos Chapman, sculptors
- Judy Chicago (born 1939), feminist artist
- Dale Chihuly (born 1941), glass artist
- Nina Childress (born 1961), painter
- Luke Ching (born 1972), conceptual artist
- Dan Christensen (1942–2007), abstract painter
- Abraham David Christian (born 1952), sculptor
- Chinwe Chukwuogo-Roy (1952–2012), painter and printmaker
- Christo and Jeanne-Claude, site-specific artists
- Paolo Cirio (born 1979), Internet artist
- Lygia Clark (1920–1988), painter and installation artist
- Brian Clarke (1953–2025), multidisciplinary artist, painter and stained glass designer
- Francesco Clemente (born 1952), painter
- Chuck Close (1940–2021), painter
- Claude Closky (born 1963), new media artist
- Arnaud Cohen (born 1968), sculptor
- Delphine Coindet (born 1969), sculptor and installation artist
- Robert Colescott (1925–2009), painter
- Mat Collishaw (born 1966), photographer and video artist
- George Condo (born 1957), painter
- Cortis & Sonderegger, installation artists
- Anne-Lise Coste (born 1973), painter
- Tony Cragg (born 1945), sculptor
- Michael Craig-Martin (born 1941), painter, printmaker, digital artist and sculptor
- Martin Creed (born 1968), installation artist
- Patricia Cronin (born 1963), multidisciplinary artist
- Njideka Akunyili Crosby (born 1983), painter
- José Luis Cuevas (1934–2017), painter, printmaker and sculptor

== D ==
- Dado (1933–2010), painter
- Hanne Darboven (1941–2009), conceptual artist
- Ann Darbyshire (1926–2007), print-maker
- Ian Davenport (born 1966), painter and printmaker
- Ronald Davis (1937–2025), abstract painter
- Richard Deacon (born 1949), sculptor
- Tacita Dean (born 1965), conceptual artist and filmmaker
- Wim Delvoye (born 1965), neo-conceptual artist
- Walter De Maria (1940–2013), installation artist, conceptual artist
- Abigail DeVille (born 1981), installation and sculpture artist
- Guy Denning (born 1965), painter
- Richard Diebenkorn (1922–1993), painter
- Rineke Dijkstra (born 1959), photographer
- Sam Dillemans (born 1965), painter
- DOT DOT DOT, conceptual artist
- Braco Dimitrijevic (born 1948), conceptual artist
- Jim Dine (born 1935), sculptor
- Mark di Suvero (born 1933), sculptor
- Harry Dodge (born 1966), visual artist
- Peter Doig (born 1959), painter
- Marlene Dumas (born 1953), painter
- John Duncan (born 1953), performance and installation artist
- Carroll Dunham (born 1949), painter

== E ==
- Martin Eder (born 1968), painter
- Ólafur Elíasson (born 1967), installation artist
- Tracey Emin (born 1963), multimedia artist
- Ben Enwonwu (1917–1994), painter and sculptor
- Bracha Ettinger (born 1948), painter
- Valie Export (born 1940), video and performance artist
- Mary Beth Edelson (1933–2021), feminist artist

== F ==
- Jan Fabre (born 1958), multidisciplinary artist
- Öjvind Fahlström (1928–1976), multimedia artist
- Harun Farocki (1944–2014), filmmaker
- Angus Fairhurst (1966–2008), installation artist
- Hans-Peter Feldmann (born 1941), photographer and installation artist
- Kenneth Feingold (born 1952), conceptual artist
- Brendan Fernandes (born 1979), performance artist
- Teresita Fernández (born 1968), multidisciplinary artist
- Esther Ferrer (born 1937), conceptual and performance artist
- Carole Feuerman (born 1945), sculptor
- Stephen Finer (born 1949), painter
- Eric Fischl painter (born 1948), painter, sculptor and printmaker
- Peter Fischli & David Weiss, video artists
- Dan Flavin (1933–1996), minimalist
- Bruno Fonseca (1958–1994), painter and sculptor
- Caio Fonseca (born 1959), painter
- Peter Forakis (1927–2009), sculptor
- Günther Förg (1952–2013), painter, graphic designer, sculptor and photographer
- Sam Francis (1923–1994), painter
- Helen Frankenthaler (1928–2011), painter
- Andrea Fraser (born 1965), performance artist
- Lucian Freud (1922–2011), painter
- Tom Friedman (born 1965), conceptual sculptor
- Chiara Fumai (1979–2017) performance artist

== G ==
- Ellen Gallagher (born 1965), multidisciplinary artist
- Anya Gallaccio (born 1963), installation artist
- Enrico Garff (born 1939), painter
- Kendell Geers (born 1968), conceptual artist
- Isa Genzken (born 1948), sculptor
- Gilbert and George, sculptors and performance artists
- Adrian Ghenie (born 1977), painter
- Sam Gilliam (1933-2022), painter
- Liam Gillick (born 1964), conceptual artist
- Karin Giusti (born 1955), sculptor and installation artist
- Robert Gober (born 1954), sculptor
- Michael Goldberg (1924–2007), painter
- Nan Goldin (born 1953), photographer
- Jack Goldstein (1945–2003), painter
- Andy Goldsworthy (born 1956), sculptor and photographer
- Peter Golfinopoulos (born 1928), painter
- Leon Golub (1922–2004), painter
- Felix Gonzales-Torres (1957–1996), sculptor and installation artist
- Dominique Gonzalez-Foerster (born 1965), artist and filmmaker
- Robert Goodnough (1917–2010), painter
- Douglas Gordon (born 1966), video artist and photographer
- Antony Gormley (born 1950), sculptor
- Dan Graham (1942–2022), multidisciplinary artist
- Robert Graham (1938–2008), sculptor
- Rodney Graham (1949–2022), photographer and installation artist
- Cleve Gray (1918–2004), painter
- Kaloust Guedel (born 1956), painter, and sculptor
- Genco Gulan (born 1969), sculptor and performance artist
- Don Gummer (born 1946), sculptor
- Andreas Gursky (born 1955), photographer

== H ==
- Hans Haacke (born 1936), conceptual artist
- Jacques Halbert (born 1955), neo-dada artist
- Petrit Halilaj (born 1986), installation artist
- David Hall (1937–2014), video artist
- Richard Hamilton (1922–2011), painter and collagist
- Keith Haring (1958–1990), painter and graffiti artist
- Mona Hatoum (born 1952), performance artist
- Susan Hauptman (1947–2015), work on paper
- Carl Michael von Hausswolff (born 1956), sound artist
- Tim Hawkinson (born 1960), sculpture artist
- Mary Heilmann (born 1940), painter, sculptor
- Al Held (1928–2005), painter
- Gottfried Helnwein (born 1948), multimedia artist, installation artist, painter, photographer and performance artist
- Diango Hernandez (born 1970), conceptual artist and painter
- Jeremy Henderson (1952–2009), painter
- Eva Hesse (1936–1970), sculptor
- Andreas Heusser (born 1976), conceptual artist
- Hugo Heyrman (born 1942), painter and multimedia artist
- Gary Hill (born 1951), video artist
- Susan Hiller (1940–2019), installation artist
- Charles Hinman (1932–2026), painter
- Thomas Hirschhorn (born 1957), installation artist
- Damien Hirst (born 1965), installation artist
- David Hockney (born 1937), painter
- Jim Hodges (born 1957), installation artist
- Howard Hodgkin (1932–2017), painter
- Candida Höfer (born 1944), photographer
- Michael Hofmann (born 1948), sumi-e painter
- Tom Holland (born 1936), mixed media artist and painter
- Frank Holliday (born 1957), painter
- Saskia Holmkvist (born 1971), conceptual artist
- Christian Holstad (born 1972), conceptual artist
- Jenny Holzer (born 1950), interdisciplinary artist
- Roni Horn (born 1955), sculptor, installation artist and writer
- Peter Howson (born 1958), painter
- Teresa Hubbard/Alexander Birchler, video artists
- Gary Hume (born 1962), painter
- Philipp Humm (born 1959), painter and multidisciplinary artist
- Pierre Huyghe (born 1962), media artist

== I ==
- Jörg Immendorff (1945–2007), painter
- INO, visual artist

== J ==
- Alfredo Jaar (born 1956), conceptual artist
- Richard Jackson (born 1939), painter, installation
- Renata Jaworska (born 1979), painter
- Chantal Joffe (born 1969), painter
- Jasper Johns (born 1930), painter and printmaker
- Ray Johnson (1927–1995), pop artist and mail art
- Jennie C. Jones (born 1968), multidisciplinary artist
- Josignacio (born 1963), painter
- Ana Jotta (born 1946), multidisciplinary artist
- Donald Judd (1928–1994), sculptor
- Isaac Julien (born 1960), filmmaker

== K ==
- Ilya Kabakov (born 1933), installation artist
- Eduardo Kac (born 1962), performance artist and BioArtist
- Stanya Kahn (born 1968), performance and video artist
- Wolf Kahn (1927–2020), painter
- Anish Kapoor (born 1954), sculptor
- Allan Kaprow (1927–2006), painter and performance artist
- Deborah Kass (born 1952), mixed media artist
- On Kawara (1932–2014), conceptual artist
- Mel Kendrick (born 1949), sculptor
- Mary Kelly (born 1941), conceptual artist
- Mike Kelley (1954–2012), sculptor, installation artist and performance artist
- Ellsworth Kelly (1923–2015), painter
- William Kentridge (born 1955), draughtsman, filmmaker and sculptor
- Anselm Kiefer (born 1945), painter
- Manfred Kielnhofer (born 1967), sculptor, designer and photographer
- Edward Kienholz (1927–1994), installation artist
- Karen Kilimnik (born 1962), painter
- Bodys Isek Kingelez (1948–2015), sculpture
- Martin Kippenberger (1953–1997), conceptual artist and installation artist
- Kimchi and Chips, media art duo
- Komar and Melamid, conceptual artists
- Jeff Koons (born 1955), conceptual artist
- Mark Kostabi (born 1960), painter
- Barbara Kruger (born 1945), photographer
- Peter Kuckei (born 1938), painter
- Yayoi Kusama (1929–2026), installation artist, performance artist and painter
- Miriam Syowia Kyambi (born 1979), interdisciplinary multimedia installation and performance artist

== L ==
- David LaChapelle (born 1963), photographer
- Suzanne Lacy (born 1945), performance artist
- Suzanne Lafont (born 1949), photographer
- Ronnie Landfield (born 1947), painter
- Michael Landy (born 1963), conceptual artist
- Thomas Lanigan-Schmidt (born 1948), installation and collage artist
- Maria Lassnig (1919–2014), painter
- Matthieu Laurette (born 1970), multimedia, conceptual, installation and video artist
- Robert Lazzarini (born 1965), sculptor and installation artist
- Lee Bul (born 1964), sculpture, installation and conceptual artist
- Lee Hun Chung (이헌정) (born 1967), ceramics and concrete
- Marc Lee (born 1969), installation, new media and conceptual artist
- Zoe Leonard (born 1961), photographer and visual artist
- Mark Lewis (born 1958), installation and film artist
- Barry Le Va (1941-2021), painter and conceptual artist
- Peter Wayne Lewis (born 1953), painter
- Sol LeWitt (1928–2007), installation and conceptual artist
- Richard Long (born 1945), sculptor, photographer and painter
- Robert Longo (born 1953), painter and sculptor
- Lee Lozano (1930–1999), painter
- Rafael Lozano-Hemmer (born 1967), installation artist
- Sarah Lucas (born 1962), photographer, sculptor and conceptual artist

== M ==
- Tala Madani (born 1981), painter and video artist
- Robert Mangold (born 1937), painter
- Robert Mapplethorpe (1946–1989), photographer
- Christian Marclay (born 1955), composer and conceptual artist
- Bruce McLean (born 1944), conceptual, performance, sculptor and painter
- Brice Marden (born 1938), painter
- Kerry James Marshall (born 1955), painter
- Milovan Destil Marković (born 1957), painter and performance artist
- Agnes Martin (1912–2004), painter
- Eugene J. Martin (1938–2005), painter
- Enrique Martinez Celaya (1964), painter and sculptor
- Gordon Matta-Clark (1943–1978), conceptual artist
- Amanda Matthews (born 1968), sculptor, painter, public art
- Paul McCarthy (born 1945), performance and installation artist
- Allan McCollum (born 1944), sculptor and installation artist
- Ryan McGinley (born 1977), photographer
- Steve McQueen (born 1969), filmmaker and video artist
- Cildo Meireles (born 1948), sculptor and installation artist
- Ana Mendieta (1948–1985), sculptor, performance and video artist
- Yucef Merhi (born 1977), installation and new media artist
- Thom Merrick (born 1963), sculptor, painter
- Boris Mikhailov (born 1938), photographer
- Ann Mikolowski (1940–1999), painter, printmaker and book artist
- Haroon Mirza (born 1977), sculptor and installation artist
- Eva Moll (born 1961), painter, performance and installation artist
- Dianna Molzan (born 1972), painter, sculptor
- Franco Mondini-Ruiz (born 1961), painter, sculptor, performance and installation artist
- Jonathan Monk (born 1969), conceptual artist
- François Morellet (1926–2016), painter, engraver, sculptor and light artist
- Yasumasa Morimura (born 1951), photographer
- Robert Morris (1931–2018), sculptor, writer and conceptual artist
- Ed Moses (1926–2018), painter
- Antoni Muntadas (born 1942), installation and new media artist
- Vik Muniz (born 1961), photographer
- Bruce Munro (born 1959), installation artist
- Takashi Murakami (born 1962), sculptor and painter
- Elizabeth Murray (1940–2007), painter
- Zoran Mušič (1909–2005), painter
- Wangechi Mutu (born 1972), painter

== N ==
- Bruce Nauman (born 1941), multidisciplinary artist
- Ernesto Neto (born 1964), installation artist
- John Nieto (1936–2018), painter
- Odd Nerdrum (born 1944), painter
- Shirin Neshat (born 1957), visual artist
- NEVERCREW, installation artists
- Alexander Ney (born 1939), sculptor and painter
- Graham Nicholls (born 1975), installation artist
- Olaf Nicolai (born 1962), conceptual artist
- Kenneth Noland (1924–2010), painter
- Thomas Nozkowski (1944–2019), painter
- Jim Nutt (born 1938), painter
- Marina Núñez (born 1966), multimedia artist

== O ==
- Albert Oehlen (born 1954), painter
- Markus Oehlen (born 1956), painter
- Chris Ofili (born 1968), painter
- Georgia O'Keeffe (1887–1986), painter
- Claes Oldenburg (1929–2022), sculptor
- Jules Olitski (1922–2007), painter
- Nathan Oliveira (1928–2010), painter
- Camila Oliveira Fairclough (born 1979), painter
- Yoko Ono (born 1933), musician and conceptual artist
- Bruce Onobrakpeya (born 1932), printmaker, painter and sculptor
- Orlan (born 1947), performance and body artist
- Roman Opałka (1931–2011), painter
- Catherine Opie (born 1961), photographer
- Julian Opie (born 1958), digital artist
- Dennis Oppenheim (1938–2011), conceptual and installation artist
- Gabriel Orozco (born 1962), conceptual and installation artist
- Tony Oursler (born 1957), multimedia and installation artist

== P ==
- Nam June Paik (1932–2006), video artist
- Satyendra Pakhalé (1967), sculptor, ceramist, painter
- Roxy Paine (born 1966), sculptor
- Eduardo Paolozzi (1924–2005), sculptor
- Niki de Saint Phalle (1930–2002), sculptor
- Cornelia Parker (born 1956), sculptor and installation artist
- Ray Parker (1922–1990), painter
- Ed Paschke (1939–2004), painter
- Simon Patterson (born 1967), conceptual artist
- Oliver Payne and Nick Relph, video artists
- Grayson Perry (born 1960), ceramicist
- Maja Petric (born 1981), new media artist
- Raymond Pettibon (born 1957), drawing, video and installation artist
- Elizabeth Peyton (born 1965), painter
- Adrian Piper (born 1948), conceptual artist
- Steven Pippin (born 1960), sculptor
- Michelangelo Pistoletto (born 1933), painter, action and object artist
- Lari Pittman (born 1952), painter
- Paola Pivi (born 1971), multimedia artist
- Sigmar Polke (1941–2010), painter and photographer
- Larry Poons (born 1937), painter
- William Powhida (born 1976), painter
- Kenneth Price (1935–2012), ceramicist, sculptor
- Richard Prince (born 1949), painter and photographer
- Laure Prouvost (born 1978), installation artist
- Martin Puryear (born 1941), sculptor

== Q ==
- Marc Quinn (born 1964), sculptor

== R ==
- Alessandro Raho (born 1971), painter and photographer
- Arnulf Rainer (1929–2025), painter
- Yvonne Rainer (born 1934), performance artist
- Rallé (born 1949), painter
- Ramin, Rokni, Hesam, artist collective
- Paul Henry Ramirez (born 1963), painter
- Neo Rauch (born 1960), painter
- Robert Rauschenberg (1925–2008), painter, collagist, printmaker and neo-dadaist
- Peter Reginato (born 1945), sculptor
- Paula Rego (1935–2022), painter
- Seund Ja Rhee (1918–2009), painter, printmaker and ceramicist
- Jason Rhoades (1965–2006), installation artist and sculptor
- Jesse Richards (born 1975), artist
- Renee Richetts (born 1955), artist
- Gerhard Richter (born 1932), painter
- Pipilotti Rist (born 1962), video artist
- Larry Rivers (1923–2002), painter and multimedia artist
- Dorothea Rockburne (born 1929), painter
- James Rosenquist (1933–2017), painter
- Martha Rosler (born 1943), video artist, installation artist and performance artist
- Dieter Roth (1930–1998), artist's books, sculptor and installation artist
- Thomas Ruff (born 1958), photographer
- Allen Ruppersberg (born 1944), conceptual artist, mixed media and installation artist
- Edward Ruscha (born 1937), painter, printmaker and filmmaker

== S ==
- Anri Sala (born 1974), video artist
- Chéri Samba (born 1956), painter
- Jean-Michel Sanejouand (1934–2021), painter and sculptor
- David Salle (born 1952), painter
- Bojan Sarcevic (born 1974), sculptor
- Wilhelm Sasnal (born 1972), painter
- Jenny Saville (born 1970), painter
- Raymond Saunders (born 1934), painter
- Markus Schinwald (born 1973), painter, sculptor and filmmaker
- Julian Schnabel (born 1951), painter, sculptor and filmmaker
- Carolee Schneemann (1939–2019), performance artist
- Thomas Schütte (born 1954), sculptor
- Richard Serra (1938–2024), sculptor
- Joel Shapiro (1941-2025), sculptor
- Sonia Landy Sheridan (1925–2021), computer and software artist
- Cindy Sherman (born 1954), photographer and performance artist
- Yinka Shonibare (born 1962)
- Amy Sillman (born 1966), painter
- David Simpson, (born 1928), painter
- Lorna Simpson (born 1960), interdisciplinary artist
- Theodora Skipitares, interdisciplinary artist
- Bob and Roberta Smith (born 1958), conceptual artist
- Jack Smith (1932–1989), filmmaker
- Kiki Smith (born 1954), feminist artist
- Robert Smithson (1938–1973), land artist, sculptor and photographer
- Michael Snow (1929–2023), filmmaker, musician and painter
- Joan Snyder (born 1940), painter
- Keith Sonnier (1941–2020), sculptor
- Pierre Soulages (1919–2022), painter
- Nancy Spero (1926–2009), painter
- Joe Stefanelli (1921–2017), painter
- Pat Steir (born 1938), painter
- Frank Stella (1936–2024), painter and printmaker
- Thomas Struth (born 1954), photographer
- Ronald Suchiu (born 1952), painter
- Hiroshi Sugimoto (born 1948), photographer
- Sarah Sze (born 1969), sculptor

== T ==
- William Tillyer (born 1938), painter and printmaker
- Tomoko Takahashi (born 1966), installation artist
- Ruben Talberg (born 1964), Neo-Fluxus sculptor
- Mark Tansey (born 1949), painter
- CJ Tañedo (born 1979), painter
- Sam Taylor-Wood (born 1967), filmmaker and photographer
- Diana Thater (born 1962), video artist
- Paul Thek (1933–1988), painter, sculptor and installation artist
- Wayne Thiebaud (1920–2021), painter and printmaker
- Hank Willis Thomas (born 1976), conceptual artist
- K. P. Thomas (artist) (born 1951), painter
- Arthur Thrall (1926–2015), printmaker and painter
- Agnes Thurnauer (born 1962), painter
- Wolfgang Tillmans (born 1968), photographer
- Rirkrit Tiravanija (born 1961), conceptual and installation artist
- Mark Titchner (born 1973), painter
- Slaven Tolj (born 1964), performance and installation artist
- Seb Toussaint (born 1988), painter and street artist
- Scott Treleaven (born 1975), filmmaker
- Rosemarie Trockel (born 1952), installation artist
- Gavin Turk (born 1967), sculptor
- James Turrell (born 1943), installation artist
- Richard Tuttle (born 1941), postminimalist
- Luc Tuymans (born 1958), painter
- Cy Twombly (1928–2011), painter
- Keith Tyson (born 1969), drawing, painter and installation artist

== U ==
- Francis Upritchard (born 1976), installation artist
- Tomasz Urbanowicz (born 1959), installation artist

== V ==
- Koen Vanmechelen (born 1965), multimedia artist
- Lydia Venieri (born 1964), painter, sculptor and photographer
- Bill Viola (1951–2024), video artist
- Wolf Vostell (1932–1998), multimedia artist
- Peter Voulkos (1924–2002), ceramicist and sculptor
- Marc Vaux (born 1932), conceptual, painter and sculptor

== W ==
- Kara Walker (born 1969), installation artist
- Jeff Wall (born 1946), photographer
- Magnus Wallin (born 1965), video artist
- Mark Wallinger (born 1959), conceptual artist
- Suling Wang (born 1968), painter
- Nari Ward (born 1963), installation artist
- Andy Warhol (1928–1987), pop artist
- Gillian Wearing (born 1963), conceptual artist
- Carrie Mae Weems (born 1953), photographer
- Lawrence Weiner (1942–2021), conceptual artist
- Monika Weiss (born 1964), installation, video and performance artist
- Ai Weiwei (born 1957), conceptual artist
- Elsa Werth (born 1985), installation artist
- Tom Wesselmann (1931–2004), painter
- Franz West (1947–2012), drawing, painter and sculptor
- Rachel Whiteread (born 1963), sculptor
- Jack Whitten (1939–2018), painter
- Alison Wilding (born 1948), sculptor
- Hannah Wilke (1940–1993), sculptor
- Thornton Willis (1936-2025), painter
- Jane and Louise Wilson (born 1967), installation artists
- Richard Wilson (born 1953), installation artist
- Jerome Witkin (born 1939), American figurative artist
- Joel-Peter Witkin (born 1939), photographer
- Francesca Woodman (1958–1981), photographer
- Wu Guanzhong (1919–2010), painter
- Erwin Wurm (born 1954), sculptor and photographer
- Andrew Wyeth (1917–2009), painter

== X ==
- Xcopy, digital artist
- Xing Xin (born 1981), performance artist

== Y ==
- Lynette Yiadom-Boakye (born 1977), painter
- Peter Young (born 1940), painter
- Jack Youngerman (1926–2020), painter

== Z ==
- Andrea Zittel (born 1965), installation artist
- Larry Zox (1936–2006), painter
- Ricardo Estanislao Zulueta (born 1962), interdisciplinary artist

== See also ==
- Art
- Lists of painters
- List of modern artists
- List of sculptors
