= Galerie Laure Roynette =

Coordinates: 48.8601°N 2.3636°E

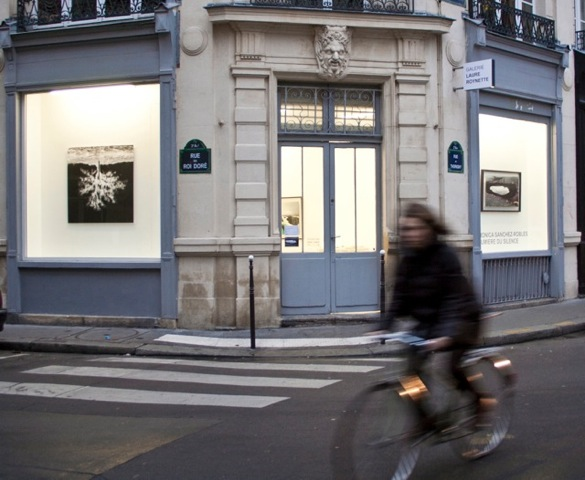
Vue extérieure

The Gallery Laure Roynette, 20, rue de Thorigny 75003 Paris, is an art gallery located in Paris, specialized in contemporary art.

== Artists represented by the Gallery ==
- Jean-Baptiste Boyer
- Géraldine Cario
- Anaïs de Chabaneix
- Miloslav Moucha
- Mathieu Weiler
- Anne Cindric
- Régis Crozat
- Marion Davout
- Alain Deswarte
- Maëlle Labussière
- Noëlle
- Nicolas Tourte
- Romina de Novellis
- Pascal Ravel
- Monica Sanchez Robles
- Emilie Bazus
- Adrianna Wallis
- Clémence Veilhan
- François Fries
- Woda
- Luo Dan

== The Gallery ==
In Le Marais, Paris, the Gallery Laure Roynette propose the work of French and strangers emergents Artists. Two of its artists are present in the ranking of the most influent French Artists: Pascal Ravel and Maëlle Labussière. The Gallery Laure Roynette has presented in 2012 : Arnaud Cohen with the exposition Une archéologie du contemporain / Ruins of now, and Anne Cindric with the exposition Missing in action « Une aspiration à la consolation : c’est ce que l’on croit décrypter en parcourant les étapes de l’œuvre d’Anne Cindric, à la fois ascétique et désirante, d’une matité de requiem et d’un rococo sans pedirgee. » Jean-Yves Jouannais.

The Gallery Laure Roynette has presented this year : Clémence Veilhan with the exposition "Et les fruits passeront la promesse des fleurs" / And the fruits will go past the promise of flowers", and François Fries with the exposition "Que vois-tu du Mont Fuji?" / "What do you see on the Mount Fuji ?"

In October, 2015, Laure Roynette Gallery will present an exhibition of Romina De Novellis, "To be or not to be" with the Bill Viola's exceptional participation. Romina De Novellis has performed, for instance, at Diner des Amis du Palais de Tokyo with her performance "Inferno" in April 2015, or more recently, she performed "UNO" in September 2015, at Espace Culturel Louis Vuitton.

The Gallery follows the work of all of its Artists, especially in their activity beyond the wall : installations, performances. The Gallery is engaged also during the European Night of Museums. The work of Anne Cindric has been presented during the forums « 1917, et après ? » at the Centre Pompidou-Metz. The performer Romina de Novellis, participates at the European Night of Museums and at the Nuit blanche.

== Publications ==
- « Abécédaire de campagne » Anne Cindric par Jean-Yves Jouannais, 2012
