= Jaune =

Jaune may refer to:

- Yellow in French
- Jaune (album), a 1970 album by Jean-Pierre Ferland
- Jewna or Jaunė, Lithuanian Grand Duchess
- Carte Jaune, an international certificate of vaccination
- Vin jaune, a type of wine

== People with the name ==
- Jaune Quick-to-See Smith (1940–2025), Native American visual artist and curator
- Oda Jaune (born 1979), Bulgarian painter
- Tête Jaune (died 1828), Iroquois-Métis trapper, fur trader, and explorer
