= Katie McGrath =

Irish actress

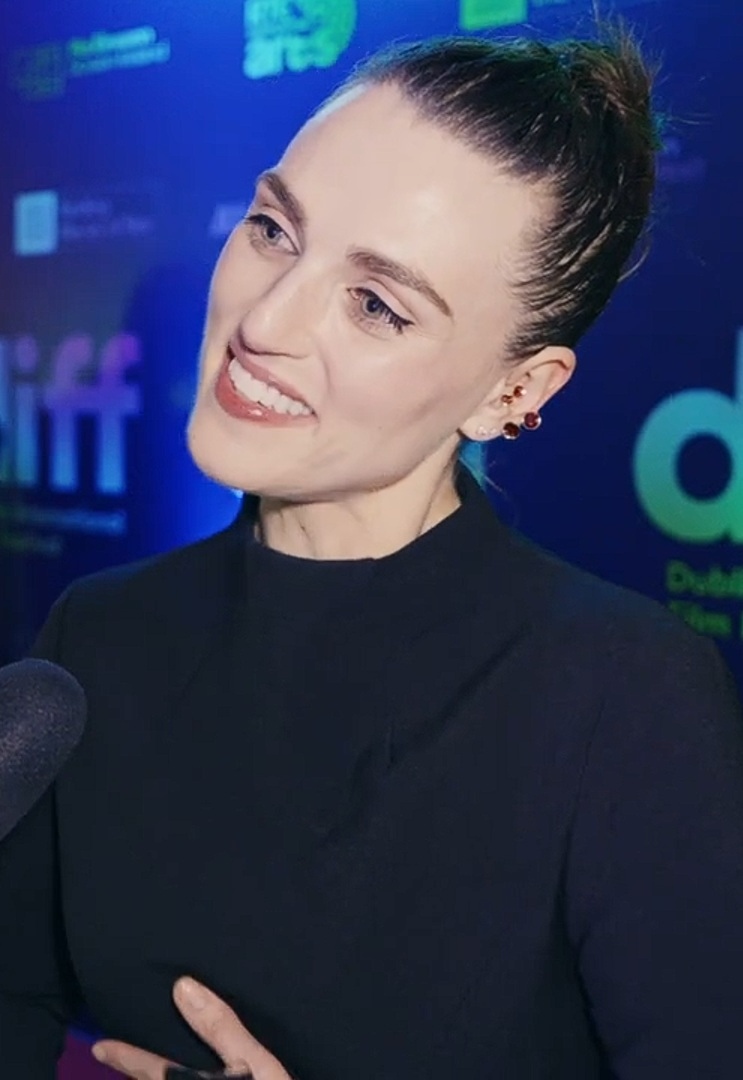
- McGrath in 2026
- Born: Ashford, County Wicklow, Ireland
- Education: St. Andrew's College, Dublin; Trinity College, Dublin
- Occupation: Actress
- Years active: 2007–present

Katie McGrath (/məˈɡrɑː/) is an Irish actress. On television, she has portrayed Morgana Pendragon in BBC One's Merlin (2008–2012), Lucy Westenra on the British-American series Dracula (2013–2014), Saskia in the TV series Secret Bridesmaids Business, Sarah Bennett in the first season of the horror anthology series Slasher (2016), and Lena Luthor on the superhero series Supergirl (2016–2021). Her film roles include Thelma Furness in the drama film W.E. and Jules Daly in the Christmas movie A Princess for Christmas (2011), Zara Young in the science fiction adventure film Jurassic World (2015), and Elsa in the epic fantasy film King Arthur: Legend of the Sword (2017).

== Early life ==
McGrath was raised in Ashford, County Wicklow, by her father, Paul, who works with computers, and mother, Mary, who works for an Irish designer. She has two older brothers, Sean, an online media manager, and Rory, who is a post-production producer. She studied the International Baccalaureate at St. Andrew's College before graduating from Trinity College, Dublin, with a degree in history with a focus on Russian history.

At a young age she applied to the Ballygowan "Be the Face of MTV" competition. Twenty finalists would be able to attend MTV Lick Party at the Tivoli.

== Career ==
McGrath originally sought to work in fashion journalism and took on a job at Image magazine before becoming a wardrobe assistant on the set of The Tudors. While working on The Tudors, McGrath was advised to try acting, so she sent photographs to Irish agents. She said:

Being an actress was kind of like when you're a kid, and you want to run away and join the circus, it's something you really want to do, but then you grew up and got a proper job. It was a dream, but I didn't think it would ever be reality, and yet here I am!

McGrath was cast in Damage, an Irish TV-movie in 2007. She also starred in the play La Marea at the Dublin Theatre Festival in the same year. She appeared in the feature films Eden and Freakdog in 2008, before being cast as Morgana Pendragon in Merlin. McGrath read for the role of Daenerys Targaryen on Game of Thrones but would have been unable to accept the role due to her commitments to Merlin.

In 2009, McGrath starred in a five-part docudrama for Channel 4 exploring the life of Queen Elizabeth II, The Queen, in which she played a young Princess Margaret. Emilia Fox portrayed Elizabeth II in the same episode in which McGrath appeared; the two had previously worked together as sisters Morgause and Morgana in Merlin. In 2010, McGrath was cast in Madonna's directorial debut W.E., an Edward VIII biopic. McGrath played Lady Furness, the king's former mistress who introduces him to Wallis Simpson.

In 2011, McGrath appeared with Roger Moore in the comedy-drama film A Princess for Christmas, a Hallmark Channel Original Movie shot mainly at the Peleş Castle in Romania. In September 2011, McGrath voice-acted the characters in the Irish animated short film Tríd an Stoirm (Through the Storm). Later that month, McGrath was cast as Oriane Congost in Labyrinth.

McGrath was reunited with her The Tudors co-star and close friend Jonathan Rhys Meyers in NBC and Sky Living's horror drama TV series Dracula; she portrayed Lucy Westenra. In June 2013, McGrath co-starred in episode four of the Channel 4 show Dates as a young lesbian on the dating scene alongside Gemma Chan.

In November 2014, McGrath co-starred in a Hozier music video for the song "From Eden".

In 2015, McGrath had a supporting role as Zara in the film Jurassic World and starred in the Crackle original spy-thriller, The Throwaways.

McGrath portrayed the lead role in the first season of Chiller's original horror series Slasher, which premiered on 4 March 2016.

In 2016, it was announced that McGrath would play the recurring role of Lena Luthor in the second season of Supergirl. She debuted in the season two premiere episode titled "The Adventures of Supergirl" and was promoted to a series regular in March 2017 and maintained this role until the show's end in 2021. She appeared as Elsa in Guy Ritchie's fantasy film King Arthur: Legend of the Sword, which was released in May 2017.

In 2019, McGrath starred alongside Abbie Cornish and Georgina Haig in Seven Network series Secret Bridesmaids' Business, about how a bride's wedding turns deadly after one of the bridesmaids invites a stranger into their lives. McGrath starred as Saskia, a bisexual lawyer who is described as an intelligent, loyal woman who is holding a secret.

In September 2023, she had a supporting role in The Continental as the Adjudicator.

In April 2025, she replaced Janet Montgomery as Jen in The Ex-Wife.

== Personal life ==
McGrath resides in Ireland to be close to family.

== Filmography ==
=== Film ===
Year	Title	Role	Notes
2007	Pebble	Tara	Short film
2011	W.E.	Lady Thelma Furness	
2012	Tríd an Stoirm	Alice/Banshee	Short film; voice role
2014	Leading Lady	Jodi Rutherford	Afrikaans film
2015	Jurassic World	Zara Young	
2015	The Throwaways	Gloria Miller	
2017	King Arthur: Legend of the Sword	Elsa	
2018	Buttons	Mrs Katherine Wentworth	
2025	Brown Bread	Aine	Short film
2026	Everybody Digs Bill Evans	Pat Evans	

=== Television ===
Year	Title	Role	Notes
2007	Damage	Rachel	Television film
2008	Eden	Trisha	Television film
2008	The Tudors	Bess	Episode: "His Majesty's Pleasure"
2008	Freakdog	Harriet Chambers	Television film
2008	The Roaring Twenties	Vixen	Television miniseries
2008–2012	Merlin	Morgana Pendragon	Main role
2009	The Queen	Margaret Rose Windsor	Episode: "Margaret"
2011	A Princess for Christmas	Jules Daly	Television film
2012	Labyrinth	Oriane Congost	Television miniseries
2013	Dates	Kate Foster	Episode: "Erica and Kate"
2013–2014	Dracula	Lucy Westenra	Main role
2016	Slasher	Sarah Bennett	Main role (season 1)
2016–2021	Supergirl	Lena Luthor	Recurring role (season 2); main role (seasons 3–6)
2016–2017	Frontier	Elizabeth Carruthers	Recurring role (seasons 1–2)
2019	Secret Bridesmaids' Business	Saskia de Merindol	Main role
2023	The Continental: From the World of John Wick	The Adjudicator	Recurring role; television miniseries
2025	The Ex-Wife	Jen	Main role (season 2); replaced Janet Montgomery
2025	Hell Motel	Katie	Episode: "Grand Guignol"
2025	Maigret	Rosalie Fernand	2 episodes
2026	Embassy		6 episodes

=== Music videos ===
Year	Title	Artist
2014	"From Eden"	Hozier

== Awards and nominations ==
Year	Award	Category	Work	Result	Ref.
2009	Monte-Carlo Television Festival	Outstanding Actress - Drama Series	Merlin	Nominated	
2011	Monte-Carlo Television Festival	Outstanding Actress - Drama Series	Merlin	Nominated	
2011	Movieguide Awards	Grace Award for Most Inspiring Performance on Television	A Princess for Christmas	Nominated	
2013	SFX Awards	Best Actress	Merlin	Nominated	
2018	Teen Choice Awards	Choice Scene Stealer	Supergirl	Nominated	
