= Saskia =

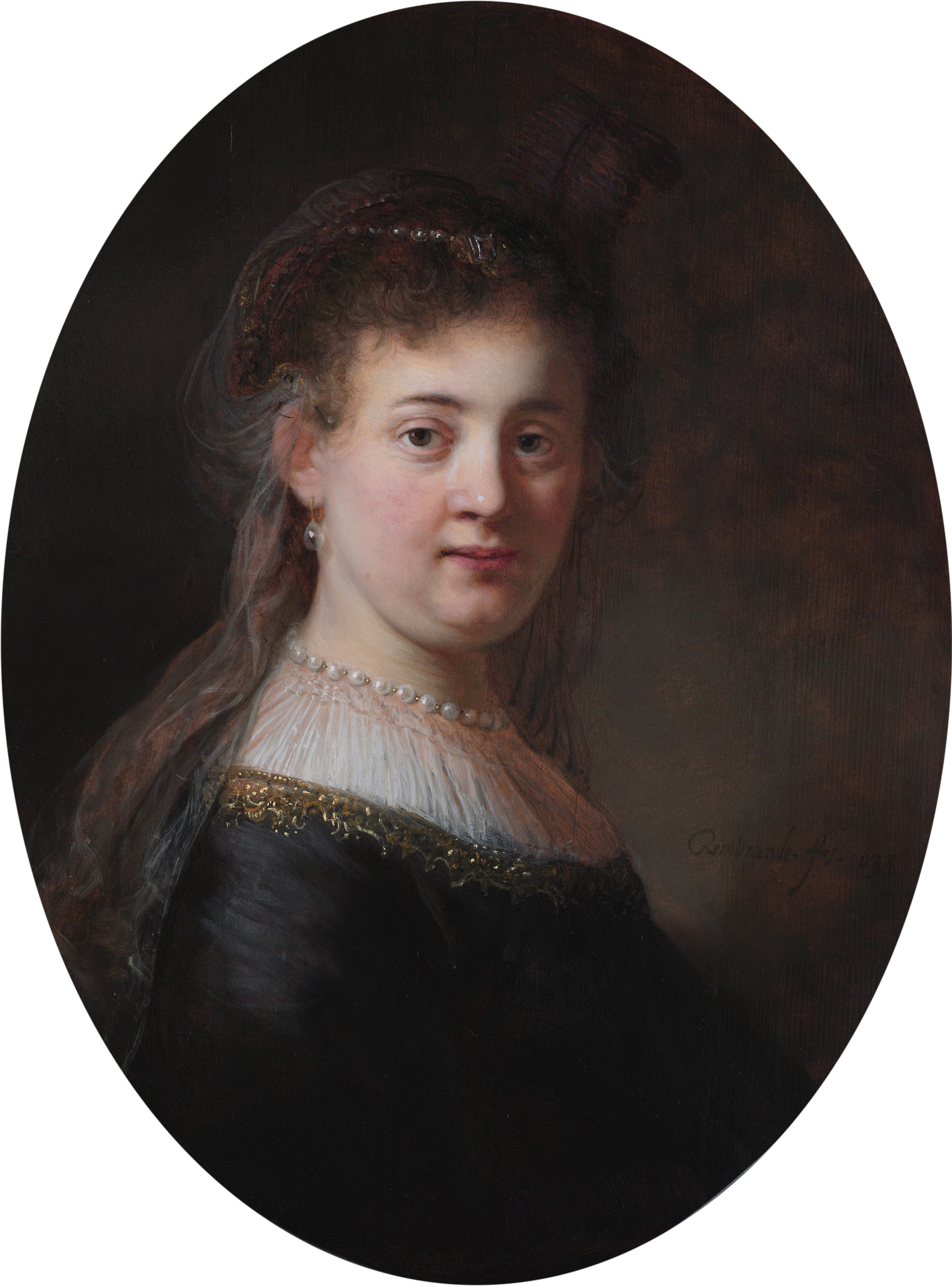
- Saskia van Uylenburgh (1612–1642), by Rembrandt.
- Gender: Female
- Language: Dutch

Origin
- Meaning: Saxon

Saskia is a Dutch feminine given name of uncertain origin. It has been in use since the Middle Ages and is also in occasional use in the Anglosphere. One source word might be the Germanic sachs, meaning Saxon. Saskia van Uylenburgh, wife of the painter Rembrandt, is the best-known bearer of the name.

Notable people with the name include:

- Saskia Alusalu (born 1994), Estonian speed skater
- Saskia Bartusiak (born 1982), German football player
- Saskia Burešová (born 1946), Czech actress, presenter and TV announcer
- Saskia Burmeister (born 1985), Australian actress
- Saskia Clark (born 1979), British sailor
- Saskia Howard Clarke, contestant on the Big Brother British television series in 2005
- Saskia Cohen-Tanugi (1959–2020), French actress and theatre director
- Saskia de Brauw (born 1981), Dutch artist and model
- Saskia de Coster (born 1976), Belgian writer
- Saskia de Jonge (born 1986), Dutch swimmer
- Saskia D'Onofrio (1924–1999), Finnish opera singer and actress, better known by her stage name Maaria Eira
- Saskia Elemans (born 1977), Dutch cyclist
- Saskia Esken (born 1961), German politician
- Saskia Fischer (born 1966), German actress
- Saskia Garel (born 1977), Jamaican-Canadian actress
- Saskia Giorgini (born 1985), Dutch-Italian pianist
- Saskia Hamilton (born 1967), American poet
- Saskia Hampele (active since 1997), Australian actress
- Saskia Hippe (born 1991), German volleyball player
- Saskia Hölbling (born 1971), Austrian choreographer and dancer
- Saskia Holleman (1945–2013), Dutch actress, lawyer and model
- Saskia Holmkvist (born 1971), Swedish artist
- Saskia Horley (born 2000), Australian cricketer
- Saskia Kosterink (born 1984), Dutch softball player
- Saskia Laroo (born 1959), Dutch jazz musician
- Saskia Linssen (born 1970), Dutch model and actress
- Saskia Mulder (born 1973), Dutch actress and younger sister of Karen Mulder
- Saskia Noort (born 1967), Dutch author
- Saskia Olde Wolbers (born 1971), Dutch video artist
- Saskia Ozinga (born 1960), Dutch activist
- Saskia Ozols (active since 2006), American artist
- Saskia Rao-de Haas (born 1971), Dutch cellist based in Delhi, India
- Saskia Reeves (born 1961), British actress
- Saskia Rosendahl (born 1993), German actress
- Saskia Sassen (born 1947), Dutch-American sociologist
- Saskia Servini (born 2001), British trampoline gymnast
- Saskia Loretta van Erven Garcia (born 1987), Dutch-Colombian fencer
- Saskia van Hintum (born 1970), Dutch volleyball player
- Saskia van Rijswijk (born 1960), Dutch martial artist and actress
- Saskia Hübner (born 1992), German-Danish furniture designer
- Saskia van Uylenburgh (1612–1642), wife of Dutch painter Rembrandt van Rijn
- Saskia Vester (born 1959), German actress
- Saskia Wickham (born 1967), British actress
- Saskia Wummelsdorf (born 1980), German badminton player

== Fictional characters ==
- Saskia de Merindol, a character in the Australian television miniseries Secret Bridesmaids' Business
- Saskia Duncan, a character in the British soap opera EastEnders
- Saskia the Dragonslayer, a character from the 2011 Polish video game The Witcher 2: Assassins of Kings
- Saskia Duncan, a character in the 2012–2013 Australian TV drama Dance Academy
- Saskia Kupferberg, daughter of Dr. Elliot Kupferberg on The Sopranos
- Saskia the Unyielding, a Magic: The Gathering card
- Saskia Madding, a character in Charles de Lint's Newford series
- Frederika Mathilde Louisa Saskia, Queen of the Netherlands, character in Neal Stephenson's novel Termination Shock

== See also ==
- 461 Saskia, an asteroid
- Noah and Saskia, a 2004 Australian children's television program
- Saskia & Serge (active since 1967), a Dutch vocal duo
