= Abbeville-Saint-Lucien =

- Commune
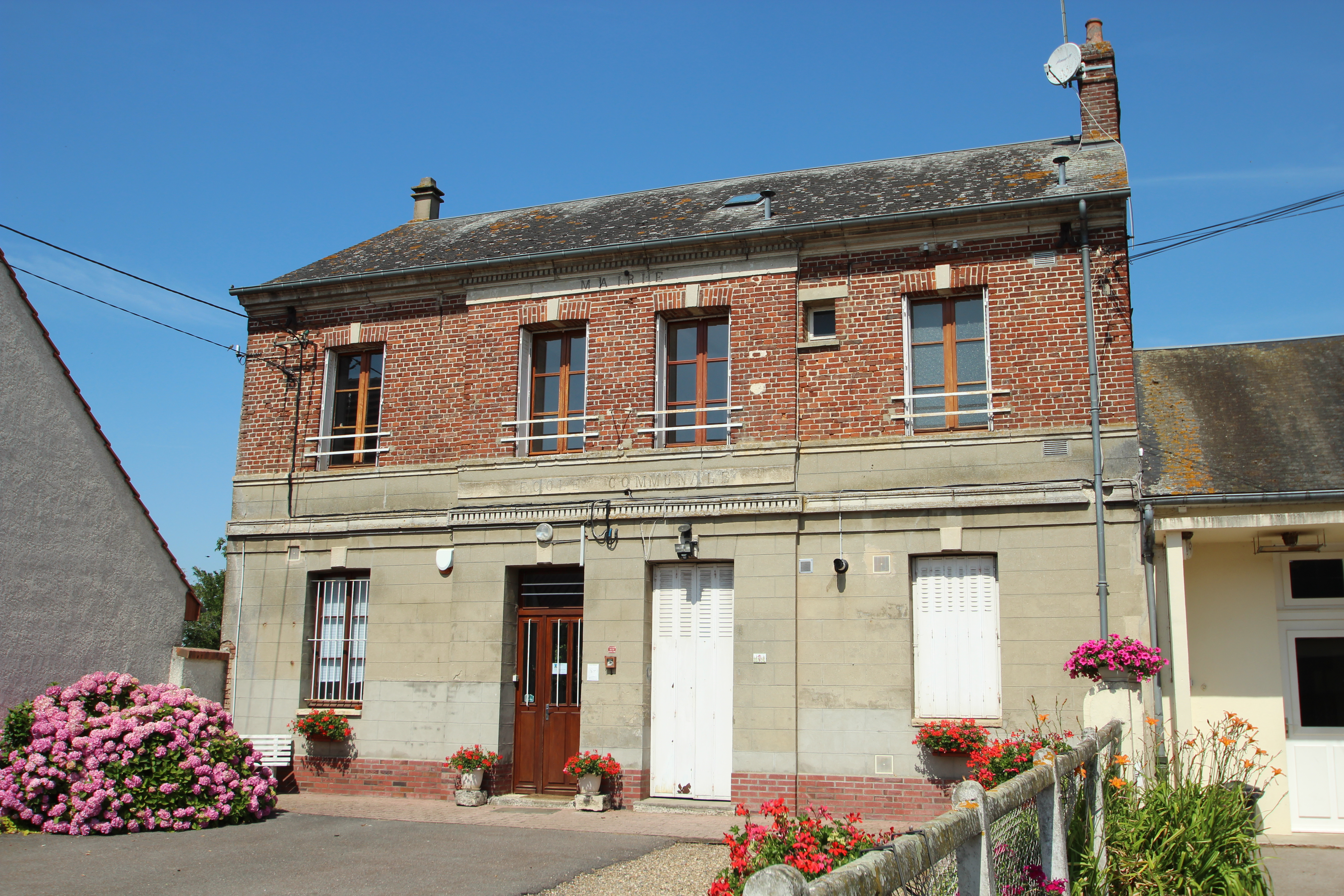
- The town hall in Abbeville-Saint-Lucien
- Location of Abbeville-Saint-Lucien
- Location within France Location within Hauts-de-France
- Coordinates: 49°31′03″N 2°10′14″E
- Country: France
- Region: Hauts-de-France
- Department: Oise
- Arrondissement: Clermont
- Canton: Saint-Just-en-Chaussée
- Intercommunality: Oise Picarde

Government
  - Mayor (2020–2026): Vincent Noël
- Area^{1}: 5.26 km^{2} (2.03 sq mi)
- Elevation: 159 m (522 ft)
- Highest elevation: 156 m (512 ft)
- Lowest elevation: 130 m (430 ft)
- Population (2023): 499
  - Density: 94.9/km^{2} (246/sq mi)
- Demonym(s): Abbevillois, Abbevilloises
- Time zone: UTC+01:00 (CET)
  - Summer (DST): UTC+02:00 (CEST)
- INSEE/Postal code: 60003 /60480
- ^{1} French Land Register data, which excludes lakes, ponds, glaciers > 1 km^{2} (0.386 sq mi or 247 acres) and river estuaries.

Abbeville-Saint-Lucien (French pronunciation: [abvil sɛ̃ lysjɛ̃]) is a commune in the Oise department in northern France.

== Population ==
Historical population

| Year | Pop. | ±% p.a. |
|---|---|---|
| 1793 | 328 | — |
| 1821 | 318 | −0.11% |
| 1846 | 337 | +0.23% |
| 1872 | 303 | −0.41% |
| 1901 | 257 | −0.57% |
| 1926 | 193 | −1.14% |
| 1946 | 220 | +0.66% |
| 1962 | 221 | +0.03% |
| 1968 | 232 | +0.81% |

| Year | Pop. | ±% p.a. |
|---|---|---|
| 1975 | 221 | −0.69% |
| 1982 | 296 | +4.26% |
| 1990 | 329 | +1.33% |
| 1999 | 506 | +4.90% |
| 2007 | 552 | +1.09% |
| 2012 | 515 | −1.38% |
| 2017 | 490 | −0.99% |
| 2023 | 499 | +0.30% |

Source: EHESS (1793-1999) and INSEE

== Historical Importance ==
On 11 and 12 September, during the Battle of Bzura, the British and the French made a decision not to help Poland. The ships with military cargo for Poland (to reach the Polish military through then neutral Romania) were turned around. In 1944, Abbeville was liberated by the General Stanislaw Maczek's Polish 1st Armoured Division.

== Notable residents ==
- Roman Opałka (1931–2011), Polish painter, a representative of conceptual art

== See also ==
- Communes of the Oise department
