= Xing Xin =

Chinese artist (born 1981)

- Born: May 25, 1981 (age 45); Chongqing, People's Republic of China
- Known for: Performance Art; Installation

Xing Xin, (Chinese 幸鑫; born 25 May 1981, in Chongqing, China), is a contemporary Chinese artist based in Chengdu, Sichuan Province, China, involved in installation and performance art. Xing Xin started as a performance artist in 2003, with an academic background in sculpture, and is currently teaching performance art, video art, and installation in Sichuan Fine Arts Institute.

== Early works ==
Xing Xin embarked on his journey in 1996 with his first publication. His earlier works are mostly themed with imprisonment and enfranchisement. He reveals and introspects into his inner-self and state of mind with the accustomed imprisonment bestowed upon by assorted almighty powers. His early works have been prominently included in the Personal Structures exhibitions, apart from his early success in being included in the Macau Pavilion in the 53rd Venice Biennale.

=== Kids of Workers ===
Kids of Workers (Chinese: 《工人的孩子》) was created in 2007 in Chengdu, China, where he welded and sealed himself in a cage which was hung on a tree clustered by flowers. Thereafter within the next 19 and half hours, he cut out an exit on his own with a piece of saw and freed himself.

Later in 2008, this work was permanently collected by Macau Museum of Art, and won him a ticket to create a new piece in the 53rd Venice Biennale in Macao Pavilion.

=== My Hand Caressed My Head in Cage for Three Days and Three Nights ===
My Hand Caressed My Head in Cage for Three Days and Three Nights (Chinese: 《我的手抚摸着笼子里的头，三天三夜》) was created in 2008, where his assistant welded and sealed his head and right hand in an iron cage, and he lived for three days and three nights with another assistant's tending.

=== Send XingXin under Escort ===
Send XingXin under Escort (Chinese: 《押运幸鑫》) was created in 2008. He was welded and sealed in an iron cage, packed in a wooden box, and "delivered" as a cargo from Chengdu to Beijing under formal procedures of the logistic company without being noticed. After 2,300 miles' travel in automobile, when the "cargo" arrived in Beijing, the co-operator cut the iron cage and set him free.

=== The Black Box ===
The Black Box (Chinese: 《黑匣子》) was created in 2009 during the 53rd Venice Biennale. Xing Xin asked the co-operator to weld and seal himself in an iron box with the inner space of less than 1.5 m^{3}, and counted the number of characters in the "nine-year compulsory education" textbooks every day. (The pattern was: to count the characters of each row and record the numbers, add up the numbers in each page, finally sum up the total number of characters in the whole book, and then move on to the next book.) During the process when he was in the iron box, the box was installed in a motorboat, and cruised the canals in Venice for exhibition. The viewers on bank could see the entire installation consisted of the motorboat, iron box, and frames, as well as his situation inside the iron box through the monitors on the box.

== Later work ==
After completion of The Black Box, Xing Xin enfranchised his works from the enclosed space, and started to focus on his and his peers' practical situations.

=== Free and Easy Wandering ===
Free and Easy Wandering (Chinese: 《逍遥游》) was created in 2008, based on the philosophical thoughts of Zhuangzi. In this work, Xing Xin lay on bed, floating on Yangtze River at dawn. He drifted to the waters with the bed, and the work ended at dusk.

=== Meditation on Floating Ice ===
From June 8 to 30 in 2010, Xing Xin did another grand project, Meditation on Floating Ice (Chinese: 《吾与浮冰》). He took a team of 7, including himself and a documentary crew led by Chinese filmmaker Cao Yang, and drove from Chengdu to the headwaters of Yangtze River (Jianggudiru Glacier on the border between Qinghai and Tibet) and collected a chunk of ice. Preserved in portable refrigerating equipment, the ice was sent in the cross country vehicles with the fastest speed to the marine outfall of Yangtze River in Shanghai, and gradually melted on the East China Sea.

During the process, the team documented the rural areas to the west of China, erotic cultures in Tibetan areas, and the remains and reviving of the city after Yushu earthquake, as well as the prosperity of the cities to the east of China, and the grand 2010 Shanghai Expo.

=== How Many Hair My Father Owns on His 59th Birthday ===
Compared to the other grand projects of Xing Xin's, his work How Many Hair My Father Owns on His 59th Birthday (Chinese: 《父亲五十九岁生日时还拥有多少根头发》) performed in 2011 in A4 Contemporary Arts Center in Chengdu looks quite "simple": one table, two chairs, and a set of laboratory apparatus. However, it drew wide attention from the Chinese audience.

=== 2011, I Exhibit Myself In A Western Exhibition ===
2011, I Exhibit Myself In A Western Exhibition (Chinese: 《2011年，在一个西方的展览上展出我自己》) was created in 2011 in Personal Structures exhibition in Palazzo Bembo, a collateral event of the 54th Venice Biennale, in which he was imprisoned daily during exhibition opening hours in a small cell within the palazzo; naked to the waist, he wore only a pair of white tailored trousers - his shirt and jacket hung on the wall.

=== Pushing My Car and Galloping in the City ===
In 2012, when the Diaoyudao incident was still feverish, some extreme and angry citizens smashed and burnt Japanese cars in streets, Xing Xin pushed his car with sophisticated antecedents across the city, bearing the name Pushing My Car and Galloping in the City: Approx. 30 Miles to the East (Chinese: 《推着汽车在城市里奔跑——至西向东约30公里》).

=== Stand-Up Waiting in the Drainage Pipe ===
March 28, 2013, Xing Xin attended Tomorrow Contemporary Sculpture Award, and exhibited his sculpture/performance art work, Stand-Up Waiting in the Drainage Pipe (Chinese: 《站在下水道管里等待》).

The audience were intrigued by Xing Xin's special "sculpture", which is highly unusual to be seen in a sculpture exhibition. The curator believes that, the notion of sculpture should be dynamic, and it is not just about stiff and confirmed objects.

== Solo exhibitions ==
- June 20 - August 7, 2009: VENICE-ON THE OTHER SIDE – the third scene of The Black Box in the 53rd Venice Biennale Exhibition, A4 Contemporary Arts Center, Chengdu, China
- July 17 - August 15, 2010: Meditation on Floating Ice, Art Labor Gallery, Shanghai, China
- June 11 - July 8, 2011: Youth Artist Experimental Season 1st Round Exhibition - Xing Xin: 2007 - 2011, A4 Contemporary Arts Center, Chengdu, China

== Collections ==
- Macao Museum of Art, Kids of Workers

== Critical and academic studies ==
- Personal Structures: Time Space Existence Number One, by Peter Lodermeyer, Karlyn De Jongh, and Sarah Gold, published by DuMont, Germany 2009, ISBN 978-3-8321-9279-2
