= Oda Jaune =

Bulgarian painter

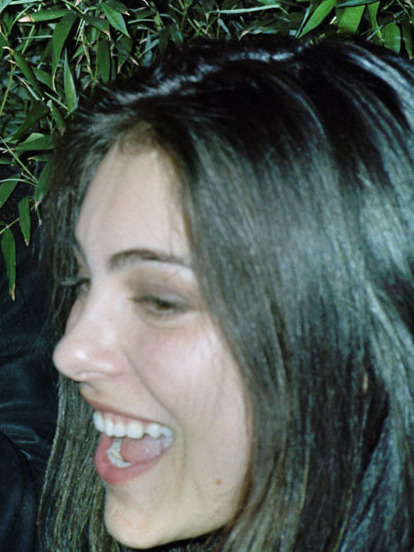
Oda Jaune

Oda Jaune (born Michaela Danowska, Michaela Danovska, Bulgarian: Михаела Дановска; 13 November 1979 in Sofia, Bulgaria) is a Bulgarian painter.

From 1998 to 2003, she studied in the class of Jörg Immendorff at the Kunstakademie Düsseldorf.

In 2012, she won the Pierre Cardin Prize in the category "Best Painter". In 2003, the second prize of the Emprise Art Award.

== Personal life ==
Jaune married in July 2000 her professor Jörg Immendorff and had a daughter on 13 August 2001. It was her husband Immendorff who invented the pseudonym Oda Jaune.

== Career ==
Oda Jaune's work has featured in a variety of exhibitions in Europe and the USA, including Musée des Beaux-Arts de Dôle (2017), Musée d'Art Moderne et Contemporain de Saint-Etienne (2016), Musée Départemental d'Art Contemporain de Rochechouart (2015), Musée Rops de Namur (2011), and La Maison Rouge, Paris and me Collectors room, Berlin (2011). In 2018, the National Art Gallery in Sofia, Bulgaria, held a major retrospective of her work, Heartland, with a catalogue published in September 2019 by Hatje Cantz.

Since 2009 she is represented by Galerie Templon in Paris and Brussels.

== Exhibitions ==
=== Solo exhibitions (selection) ===
2019

- Hands, Seen, Antwerpen, Belgium
- Beyond Gravity, Galerie Templon, Paris, France

2018

- Heartland, National Gallery of Sofia, Sofia, Bulgaria

2017

- Paintings and Sculptures, Galerie Daniel Templon, Brussels, Belgium

2016

- Blue Skies, Galerie Daniel Templon, Paris, France

2015

- Masks, Galerie Daniel Templon, Paris, France

2011

- Confrontation Félicien Rops - Oda Jaune, Musée Félicien Rops, Namur, Belgium

2010

- Once in a Blue Moon, Galerie Daniel Templon, Paris, France

2009

- May You See Rainbows, Galerie Daniel Templon, Paris, France

2007

- Fondazione Mudima, Milan, Italy

2004

- Kunsthalle Koblenz, Koblenz, Germany

== Publications ==
- Oda Jaune, Oda Jaune, Kunsthalle Koblenz, Solo exhibition catalogue, April 2004
- Oda Jaune, Paintings, Galerie Davide Di Maggio Berlin, essay by Gesine Borcherdt, Solo exhibition catalogue, September 2006
- Oda Jaune, Il mistero buffo della pittura, Fondazione Mudima Milano, essay by Achille Bonito Oliva, Solo exhibition catalogue, May 2007
- The Bearable Lightness of Being - The Metaphor of the Space, La Biennale di Venezia, 11. Mostra Internazionale di Architettura, September 2008
- Oda Jaune, May You See Rainbows, Galerie Daniel Templon, essay by Catherine Millet, Solo exhibition catalogue, February 2009
- Oda Jaune, First Water, 100 watercolors, Hatje Cantz, essay by Robert Fleck, October 2010
- Oda Jaune, Once on a Blue Moon, Galerie Daniel Templon, essay by Judicaël Lavrador, Solo exhibition catalogue, November 2010
