= Personal Structures =

Artist collective founded in 2005

Personal Structures is an international contemporary art platform, which generates the possibility for artists and art historians to discuss philosophical concepts in art.

Personal Structures was initiated in 1998 by the artist Rene Rietmeyer from the Netherlands, and was presented in the Ludwig Museum, Koblenz, in Germany in 2005. At first, the platform took shape in the form of exhibitions. Later on, in 2005, symposia were added as means for expressing thought. The first Personal Structures symposium was held at the branch of Ludwig Museum in Koblenz, Germany. Personal Structures developed in the years after. In 2007 and 2008 a symposium series was organised about the concepts time, space and existence. Since 2011, Personal Structures has become one of the collateral events of the Venice Biennale every two years, with evolving curatorial themes. The theme concept was later also extended to encompass architecture, under the organization European Cultural Centre, in the Venice Biennale that is considered diverse and boundary-pushing.

Artists who have been involved in Personal Structures are, amongst others, Joseph Kosuth, Wolfgang Laib, Roman Opałka, and Lawrence Weiner.

== Literature ==
- Peter Lodermeyer, Karlyn De Jongh & Sarah Gold, Personal Structures: Time Space Existence, DuMont, Germany 2009
- Peter Lodermeyer, Personal Structures "Works and dialogs", GlobalArtAffairs Publishing, New York, 2003
- Peter Lodermeyer (ed.), Personal Structures Symposium Ludwig Museum, GlobalArtAffairs Publishing, New York, 2006
