= Renee Richetts =

American artist

Renee Richetts (November 5, 1954) is an American artist best known for her hinged metal books, created from re-purposed materials. Her genre of work is mixed-media sculpture in the category of artist books. Examples of her work are represented in public collections at the University of California, San Diego, and the Girl Scout Museum in New York. Her work is widely collected in the U.S., Europe, and Japan. In 2005, Richetts' solo show, "Towers and SPAM" was presented in The Joan Irving Gallery. The series was an oft-times comedic pun between the precooked meat product Spam, (which is a staple in her kitchen), and the junk mail bane of internet users. In 2008, Richetts' Space gallery in Southern California began showing her art work and curator skills full-time, through installations and exhibits of her work and that of other artists, including painters Lisa Bebi, and Victoria Huckins, photographers Colene Nguyen and Brooke Binkowski, and glass artists Kellene Richetts-Nguyen and Cherrie La Porte. Richetts is also known for her eco-friendly garments and accessories, designed with recycled materials. She is an annual participant in the Escondido Arts Partnership/Municipal Gallery Recycled Materials Runway Event.

== Education ==
Richetts attended the University of California, San Diego, studying linguistics and French Literature. It was while attending U.C.S.D. that she had the opportunity to study art history and architecture in southern France and in Paris. Her arts education post-U.C.S.D. has included research in Italy, the Czech Republic, and Germany. Richetts also earned her nursing degree, graduating from Palomar College in 1982.

== Career and life ==
Richetts was raised in a family of visual artists beginning with her grandfather, who was a cartoonist for Walt Disney, her mother a painter and print-maker, and her father, a wood-carver. In the early 1970s, her parents owned a fine art gallery in Pasadena, California. Richetts credits them with her earliest theoretical and technical exposure to fine art. "I was really lucky to have been born into my family. I began using crazy materials even as a very young kid. Luckily, my parents were understanding." Other influences included Niki de Saint Phalle, Judy Chicago, Edgar Degas, and Henri Matisse. Over the past decade, Richetts’ has been much inspired by visual artists at San Diego Comic-Con. She frequents Artist Alley, which includes hundreds of book artists who display their work there every year. The influential factor of the artist books at San Diego Comic-Con is the experimental style of the artists—be it in formatting or content. Richetts also draws continual inspiration from music and starts most of her art work sessions with renditions by Talking Heads, David Bowie, and most recently, Lorde.

In addition to art, Richetts has had a career in nursing, specializing initially in intensive care, while pursuing advanced training in nursing informatics (a sub-speciality of Health Informatics) and the care of stroke survivors. Richetts received the West Coast Regional Nurse Champion award in 2009 from VHA, Inc. In 2014 she received the Gold Quality Award from Scripps Health for her team leadership in applying nursing informatics. As a volunteer, Richetts co-founded the Lesbian Health Project in 1993 through the San Diego Lesbian and Gay Men's Community Center. To honor her service, and to continually recognize those who have contributed to raising health awareness for under-served populations, The Center created the annual Renee Richetts Lesbian Health Award.

== Review of works ==
Richetts sold her first mixed-media work at a gallery in 1968, at the age of 13. Her work was first purchased for a public art collection by the University of California, San Diego’s Geisel Library Special Collection. In the past 10 years, Richetts' work has been published in Fleisch Magazine in Austria, Somerset Studio Magazine, City Beat, The San Diego Reader and on-line. In 2013, she was published in the book Creating Art at the Speed of Life, by Pam Carriker.
