= Secret Bridesmaids' Business =

- Genre: Drama
- Written by: Andrew Anastasios; David Hannam; Alli Parker; Trent Roberts; Chelsea Cassio; Shanti Gudgeon; Yanky Potter
- Directed by: Tori Garrett; Jennifer Perrott
- Starring: Katie McGrath; Abbie Cornish; Georgina Haig
- Country of origin: Australia
- Original language: English
- No. of series: 1
- No. of episodes: 6

Production
- Producer: MaryAnne Carroll
- Production location: Melbourne
- Running time: 60 minutes
- Production company: Seven Studios

Original release
- Network: Seven Network
- Release: 29 September – 22 October 2019

Secret Bridesmaids' Business is a 2019 six-part Australian television miniseries, produced by Seven Studios for the Seven Network.

== Synopsis ==
Olivia's perfect wedding turns deadly after one of her bridesmaids unknowingly invites a malevolent stranger into their lives, triggering a deadly chain reaction that blows open a hidden world of secrets.

== Cast ==
=== Main ===
- Abbie Cornish as Melanie Heyward
- Katie McGrath as Saskia de Merindol
- Georgina Haig as Olivia Cotterill
- Alexander England as Jakob Novak
- Dan Spielman as Michael Heyward
- Oliver Ackland as Alex Blake
- Annie Jones as Colleen Cotterill
- Nicholas Bell as Bill Cotterill

=== Recurring ===
- Jacquie Brennan as Kerri Lane
- Artemis Ioannides as Uzma Abbassi
- Jackson Tozer as Oscar Kayo
- Emily Taheny as Nicole Vrisaki
- Hannah Bath as Janine Antonia
- Roz Hammond as Ginger Connor
- Tom Budge as Detective McKenzie

== Episodes ==
No.	Title	Directed by	Written by	Original release date	Australian viewers
1	Episode 1	Tori Garrett	Andrew Anastasios	September 29, 2019	426,000
The joy of an unexpected wedding proposal brings three best friends closer than ever, until a series of secrets are uncovered, and a dangerous obsession begins to spiral out of control.
2	Episode 2	Tori Garrett	Trent Roberts	September 30, 2019	N/A
Saskia and Alex go to extreme lengths to conceal damning lies from the past while Olivia wrestles with her life-threatening secret.
3	Episode 3	Jennifer Perrott	Trent Roberts	October 1, 2019	424,000
As Melanie fights for her marriage in the wake of her affair, Olivia rebounds from her failed engagement with a charming stranger, and an impetuous misstep of Saskia's catches up with her.
4	Episode 4	Jennifer Perrott	Chelsea Cassio and Alli Parker	October 8, 2019	443,000
Melanie provokes a dangerous new rage in Jakob when she digs into his past. Olivia hides her diagnosis from those closest, while Saskia's unexpected relationship history is revealed.
5	Episode 5	Jennifer Perrott	Shanti Gudgeon & David Hannam	October 15, 2019	N/A
Melanie turns stalker in a bid to save another woman from Jakob's harassment, while Olivia discovers Alex's darkest secret and Saskia starts to spiral in the aftermath of a vicious attack.
6	Episode 6	Jennifer Perrott	David Hannam	October 22, 2019	N/A
Olivia's wedding has finally arrived. None of the women realise that Melanie is still in danger — Jakob is hell-bent on revenge.
