= Rallé (artist) =

American painter

- Born: September 6, 1949 (age 76); Pitești, Romania
- Education: School of Applied Arts, Department of Graphics, Skopje, Macedonia
- Known for: Painter
- Movement: Surrealism

Rallé, also known as Master of the Town of Consuls (MTC), is an American artist of North Macedonian heritage whose work has most recently been shown in the Meisel Gallery and the Bruce R. Lewin Fine Art in New York City. His paintings have accompanied several articles in the magazines Omni and Scientific American, as well as the book The Mind's Eye: The Art of Omni. He has also been featured on the covers of several books. Rallé's work has also been featured in Time Life Books, Esquire, Penthouse, Gulf-Commentator, Toronto Life, Graphics Annual and American Illustration 3. He published an autobiography in 2003, which won the 2004 Sappi European Printer of the Year gold award.

== Awards and tributes ==
- First Prize for Oil – Majska Izlozba, Moša Pijade, Bitola, Macedonia (1977)
- Merit Award – The Toronto Art Directors Club (1983)
- First Prize for Oil – Barron Arts Center (1985), Woodbridge, N.J., USA
- First Place – Artist' Liaison: National Juried Art Competition (1987), Santa Monica, CA, USA
- Award of Excellence for the painting Guilt – Communication Arts, Illustration Annual (1990)
- Art Criticism by [Jorge Alberto Manrique] (2007)

== Publications ==
- Rallé- Master of the Town of Consuls (2003). The book was published by Antilope Art Books in Lier, Belgium. Commentaries were provided by Marcel van Jole – founder of the Museum of Contemporary Art of Antwerp (MuHKA), Yonah Foncé – curator at the Museum of Contemporary Art of Antwerp (MuHKA), and Michel Gaudet – both an artist and an art critic.
- The Mind's Eye: The Art of Omni
- Our Human Herds: The Philosophy of Dual Morality and a Theory of Moral Evolution By Martin Fritz (2015)
- Foundation

== Exhibitions ==
- 1986- Delaware Art Museum, Invitational Exhibition, National Academy of Fantastic Art

== Museum Collections ==
- 2019- Art Gallery of Alberta. Temptress, 1962, Oil on panel, 20.5 x 15.4 cm, Gift of Buddy Victor & Al Osten.

== Gallery ==
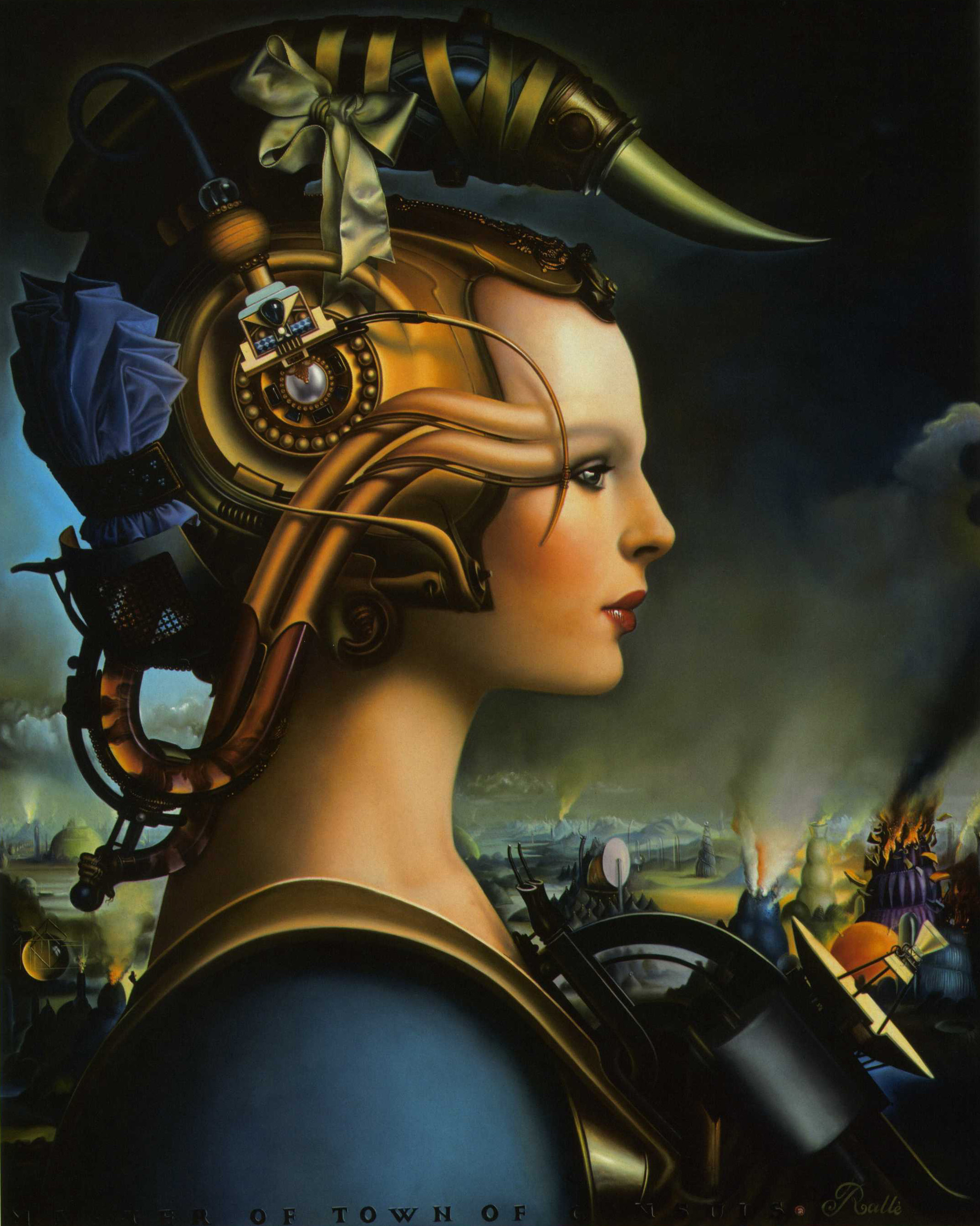
Temptress II, oil on board

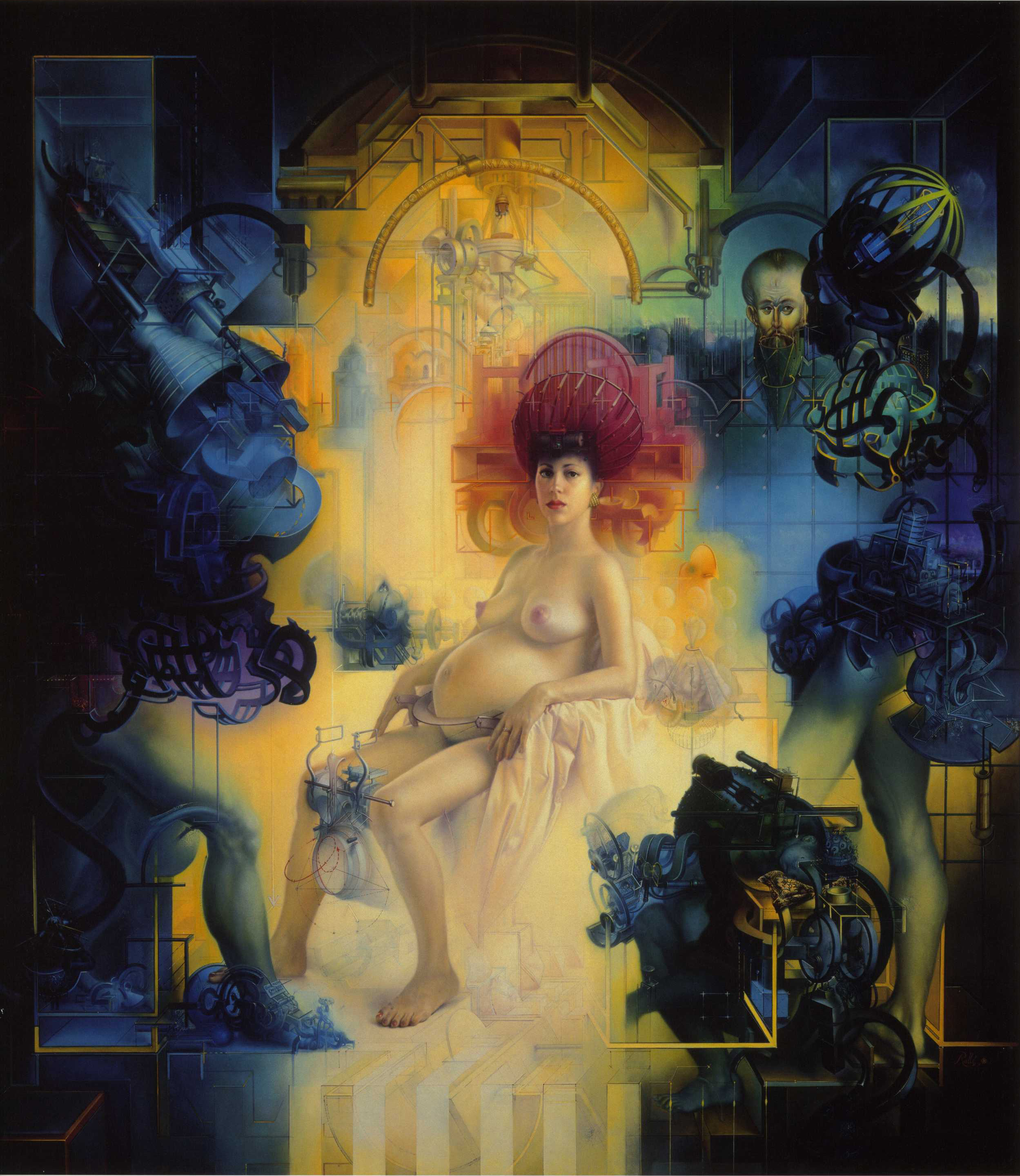
Ethical Conduct, oil on board

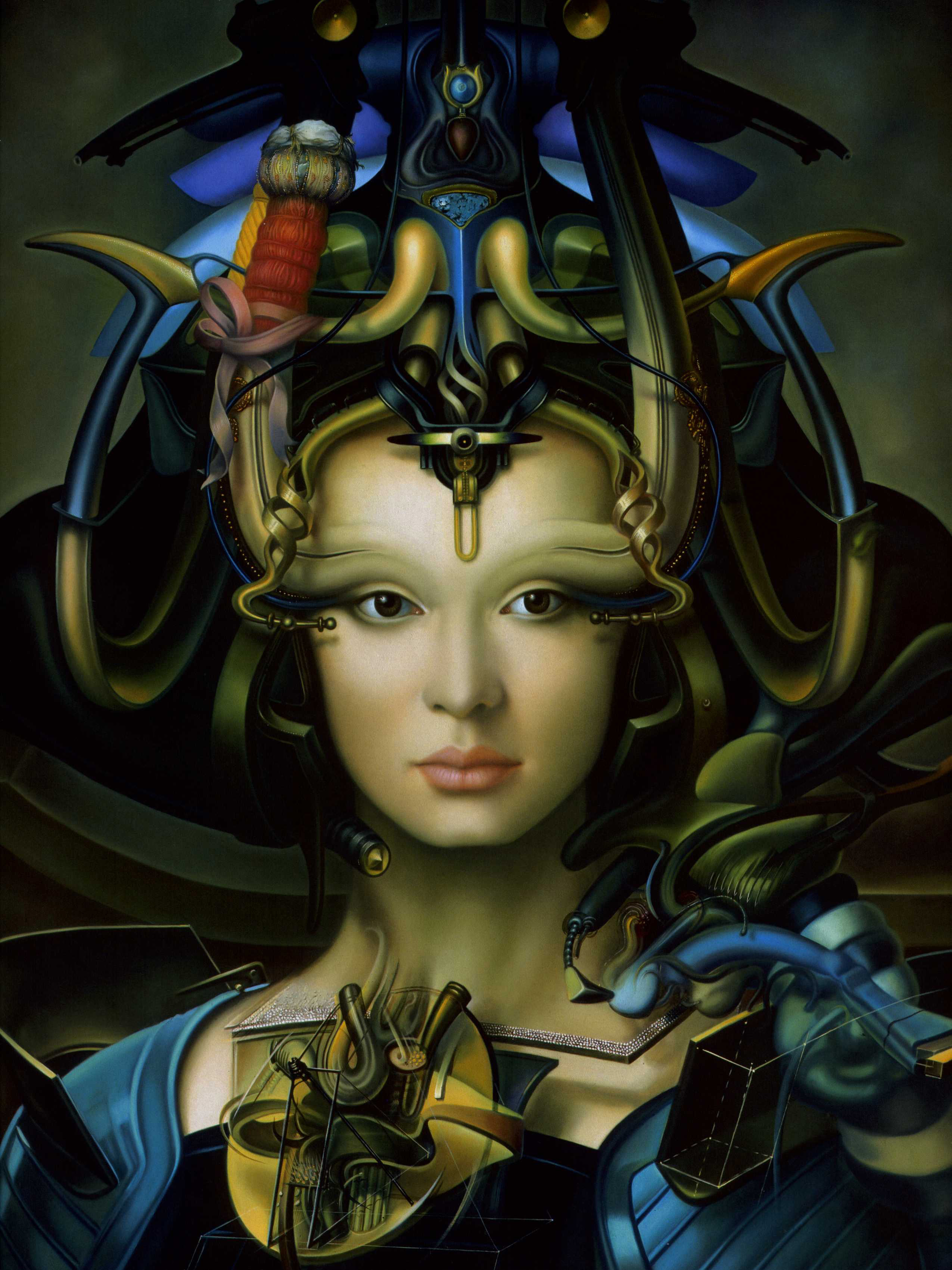
Madonna Without a Child, oil on board
