= Roman Opałka =

Polish painter (1931–2011)

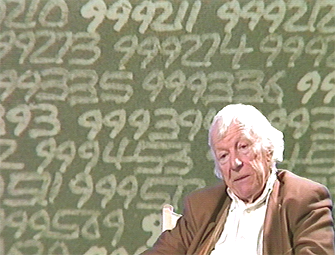
- Opałka in 1995
- Born: 27 August 1931; Abbeville-Saint-Lucien, France
- Died: 6 August 2011 (aged 79); Rome, Italy
- Known for: Painting; Contemporary art
- Awards: Commander in the Ordre des Arts et des Lettres, Paris (2009); Gold Medal of the Cultural Merit "Gloria Artis", Warsaw (2009); Special Prize of the Ministry of Foreign Affairs of the Republic of Poland (1996); Goslarer Kaiserring, Germany (1993); National Prize of Painting, Paris (1991)
- Website: opalka1965.com

Roman Opałka (Polish: [ˈrɔman ɔˈpawka]; 27 August 1931 – 6 August 2011) was a French-born Polish painter, whose works are mostly associated with conceptual art.

== Life and death ==
Opałka was born on 27 August 1931 in Abbeville-Saint-Lucien, France, to Polish parents. The family returned to Poland in 1946 and Opałka studied lithography at a graphics school before enrolling in the School of Art and Design in Łódź. He later earned a degree from the Academy of Fine Arts in Warsaw. He moved back to France in 1977. Opałka lived in Teille, near Le Mans, and Venice. He died at age 79 after falling ill while on holiday in Italy. He was admitted to a hospital near Rome and died there a few days later, on 6 August 2011.

== Work ==
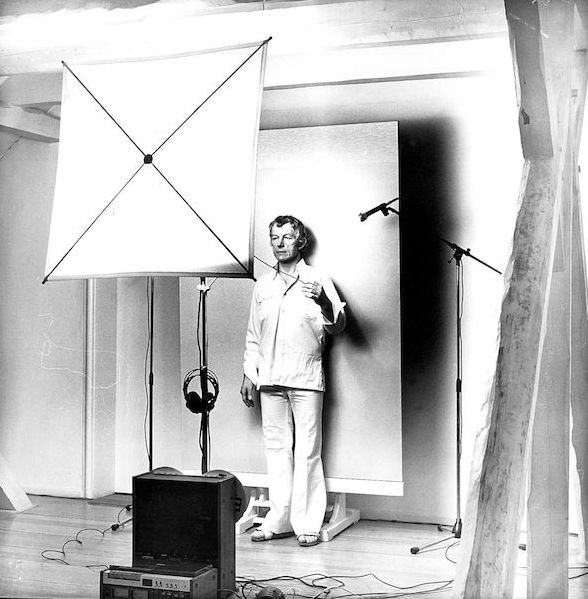
Roman Opałka by Lothar Wolleh

In 1965, in his studio in Warsaw, Opałka began painting numbers from one to infinity. Starting in the top left-hand corner of the canvas and finishing in the bottom right-hand corner, the tiny numbers were painted in horizontal rows. Each new canvas, which the artist called a "detail", took up counting where the last left off. Each "detail" has the same size (196 × 135 cm), the dimension of his studio door in Warsaw. All details have the same title, "1965 / 1 – ∞"; the project had no definable end, and the artist pledged his life to its ongoing execution: "All my work is a single thing, the description from number one to infinity. A single thing, a single life", "the problem is that we are, and are about not to be". He had contemplated and tried many different ways to visualize time before settling on this life's work.

Over the years there were changes to the process. In Opałka's first details he painted white numbers onto a black background. In 1968 he changed to a grey background "because it's not a symbolic colour, nor an emotional one", and in 1972 he decided that he would gradually lighten this grey background by adding 1% more white to the ground with each passing detail. He expected to be painting virtually in white on white by the time he reached 7777777 (he did not use commas or number breaks in the works): "My objective is to get up to the white on white and still be alive." As of July 2004, he had reached 5.5 million. Adopting this rigorously serialized approach, Opałka aligned himself with other artists of the time who explored making art through systems and mathematics, like Daniel Buren, On Kawara, and Hanne Darboven. He was represented in Paris and New York by Yvon Lambert and in Venice by Galleria Michela Rizzo.

In 1968 Opałka introduced to the process a tape recorder, speaking each number into the microphone as he painted it, and also began taking passport-style photographs of himself standing before the canvas after each day's work.

In 2007 Opałka participated at the symposium "Personal Structures Time–Space–Existence" a project initiated by the artist Rene Rietmeyer.

The final number he painted was 5607249.

== Exhibitions ==
Opałka participated in many of the art world's most important international exhibitions, including Documenta in Kassel, Germany, in 1977; the São Paulo Bienal in 1987; and the Venice Biennale, in 1995, 2003, 2011 and 2013. He was represented in Paris and New York by Yvon Lambert, in Venice by Galleria Michela Rizzo and, for many years, at John Weber in New York.

In 2003, Les Rencontres d'Arles exhibited his work through "L’œuvre photographique"'s exhibition (the curator was Alain Julien-Laferrière).

In 2017, Opałka has made part of the exhibition "Il mio corpo nel tempo / Lüthi Ontani Opalka", Galleria d'Arte Moderna, Verona 2017. Catalogue Manfredi Edizioni.

== Collections ==
Opałka's works can be found in the permanent collections of the Centre Pompidou in Paris and New York's Museum of Modern Art among others.

== Recognition ==
Opałka won the celebrated Grand Prize of the 7th International Biennial of Arts and Graphics of Cracow in 1969, the C. K. Norwid Art Critics Award in 1970, Franceʼs National Painting Prize in 1991 and Germanyʼs Goslarer Kaiserring in 1993. He was named Commander of the Ordre des Arts et des Lettres (Order of Arts and of Letters) in France. In 2009, he was awarded Medal for Merit to Culture – Gloria Artis by the Minister of Culture and National Heritage Bogdan Zdrojewski. In 2011, the President of Poland Bronisław Komorowski awarded him with Commander's Cross of the Order of Polonia Restituta. In 2011 Opalka was awarded by the European Cultural Centre Art Award for his lifelong depiction of "Time Passing".

== Legacy ==
In 2005, the German art project "Camera Obscura 2005/1-∞" was initiated as an homage to Opałka's life and work. It honours his "1965 / 1 – ∞" work by selling camera obscuras – with two pinholes – over the internet auction platform eBay. Each pinhole is sold to another buyer, and the camera is subsequently sent back to the project to be developed and exhibited in its gallery, as well as online.
