= Jörg Immendorff =

German artist (1945–2007)

- Born: 14 June 1945; Bleckede, Germany
- Died: 28 May 2007 (aged 61); Düsseldorf, Germany
- Known for: Painting, drawing, sculpture, stage design, art professor
- Notable work: Cafe Deutschland (1984); Portrait of Gerhard Schröder (2007)
- Spouse: Oda Jaune (m. 2000)
- Children: 2
- Patrons: Joseph Beuys

Cafe Deutschland, 1984, oil, 285 x 330 cm

Jörg Immendorff (14 June 1945 – 28 May 2007) was a German painter, sculptor, stage designer and art professor. He was a member of the art movement Neue Wilde.

== Early life and education ==
Immendorff was born in Bleckede, Lower Saxony, near Lüneburg on the west bank of the Elbe. When he was 11 years old, his father left the family. This traumatic experience has been used to explain Immendorff's later feelings of inadequacy and emotional remoteness. He attended the boarding School ←Ernst-Kalkuhl Gymnasium as a student. At the age of sixteen he had his first exhibition in a jazz cellar in Bonn.

Beginning in 1963, Immendorff studied at the Art Academy in Düsseldorf (Kunstakademie Düsseldorf). Initially he studied for three terms with the theater designer Teo Otto. After Otto threw him out of his class for refusing to let one of his paintings serve as stage-set decoration, Immendorff was accepted as a student by Joseph Beuys. The academy expelled him because of some of his (left-wing) political activities and neo-dadaist actions.

From 1969 to 1980, Immendorff worked as an art teacher at a public school, and then as a free artist, holding visiting professorships all over Europe. In 1989, he became professor at the Städelschule in Frankfurt am Main and in 1996 he became professor at the Art Academy in Düsseldorf—the same school that had dismissed him decades earlier as a student. His master students at the Düsseldorf Art Academy included Oda Jaune and Renata Jaworska.

== Work ==
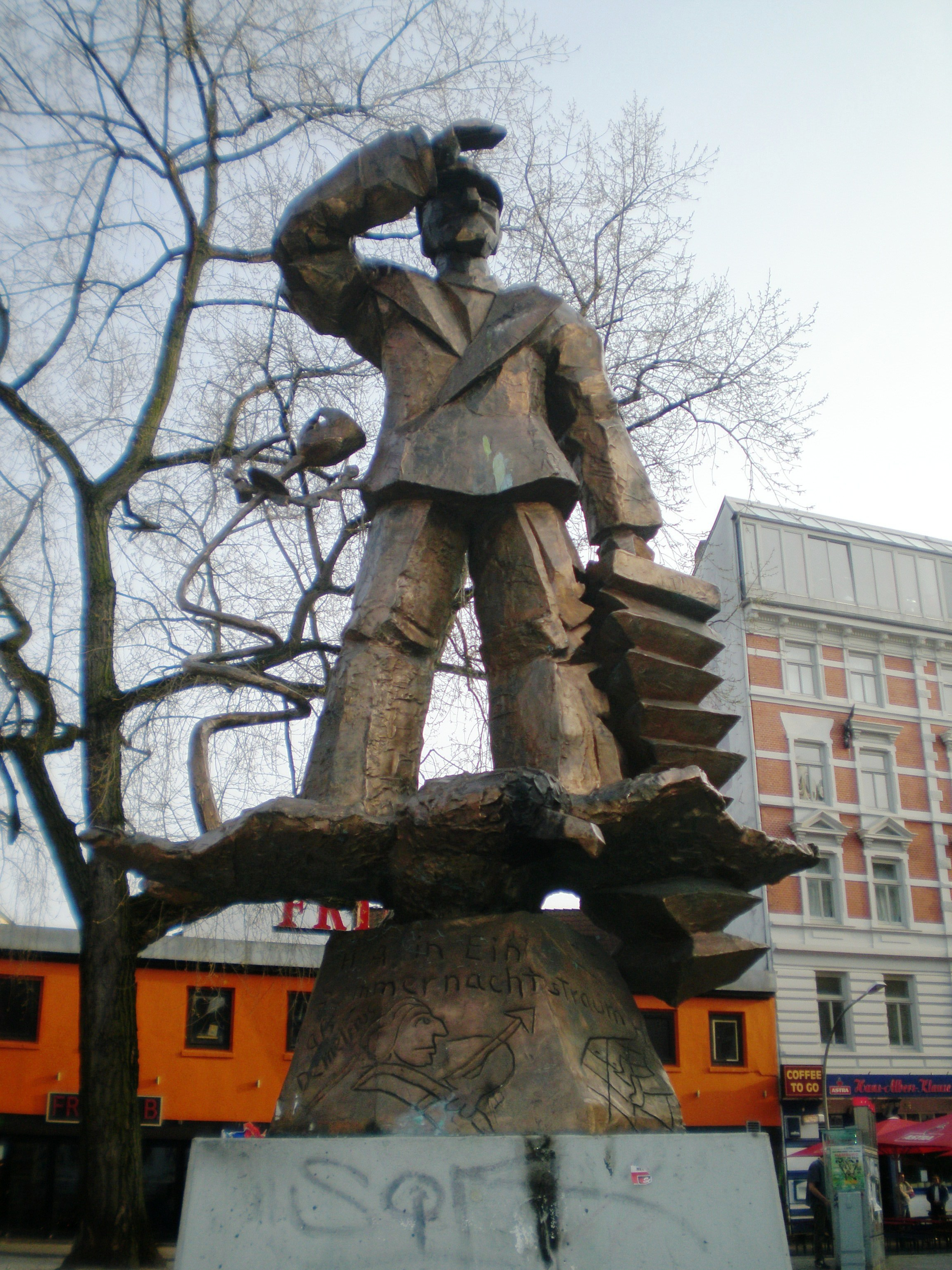
Hans Albers Statue in Hamburg-St. Pauli

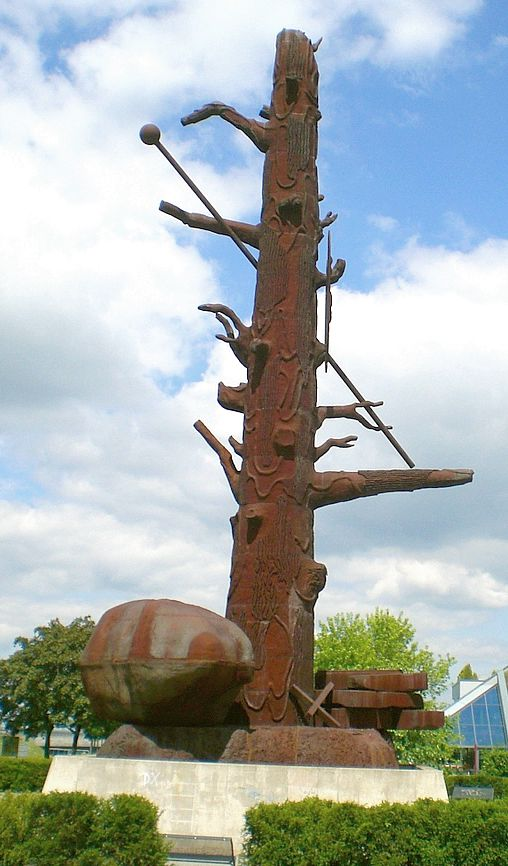
Cast steel sculpture Elbquelle (Riesa, 25m tall, erected 1999)

Jörg Immendorff often worked in "grand cycles of paintings" that often lasted years at a time and were political in nature. Notable cycles include LIDL, Maoist Paintings, Cafè Deutschland , and The Rake's Progress.

=== LIDL ===
The first body of work that Immendorff gave a name to were his LIDL paintings, sculptures, performances, and documents, that he executed during 1968–1970. The name, "LIDL" was inspired by the sound of a child's rattle makes and much of his work from this period included the iconography of new beginnings and innocence. LIDL is comparable to Dadaist but unlike the Dadist movement it never became an established group but rather consisted of a variety of artists (including James Lee Byars, Marcel Broodthaers, Nam June Paik, and Joseph Beuys) participating in actions and activities. The art-historian Pamela Kort wrote this of Immendorf's LIDL works:

"LIDL ridiculed elitist art traditions, the cult of creative 'genius', and the precious aesthetic object. The artist countered these hierarchies by assembling a body of pretentious iconographic motifs drawn from the make-believe world of the child – turtles, dogs, goldfish, playhouses, and polar bears – which he transformed into the 'working material' of what he hoped would be a new functional art form."

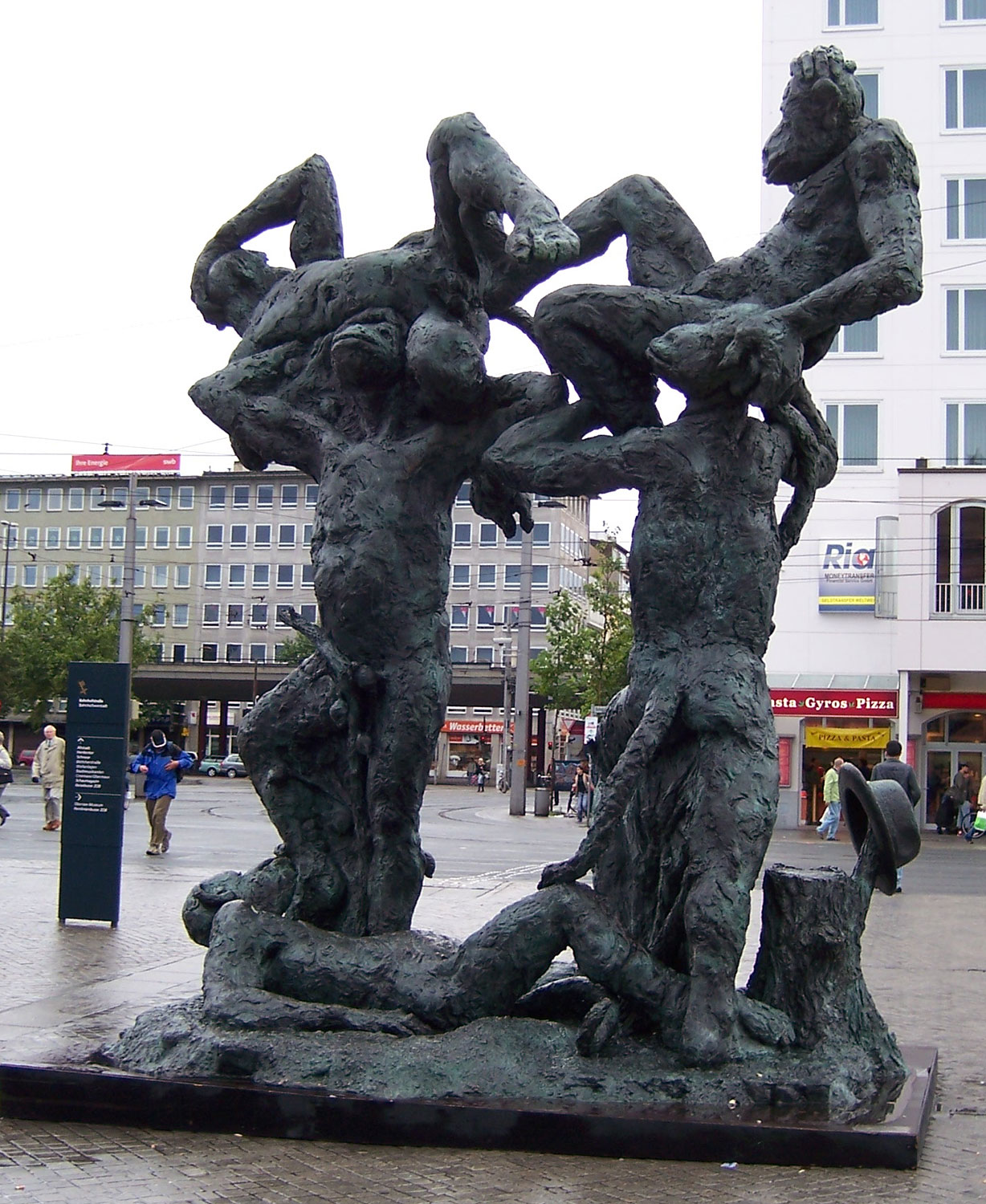
Affentor I, Bremen

Portrait of Gerhard Schröder, 2007, oil, 100 x 130 cm

In January 1968 he appeared in front of the West German Parliament in Bonn with a wood block labeled “Lidl” tethered to his ankle and painted in the colors of the German flag; he was subsequently arrested for defaming the flag.

=== Café Deutschland series ===
Best known is his Café Deutschland series of sixteen large paintings (1977–1984) that were inspired by Renato Guttuso’s Caffè Greco; in these crowded colorful pictures, Immendorff had disco-goers symbolize the conflict between East and West Germany. Since the 1970s, he worked closely with the painter A. R. Penck from Dresden (in East Germany). Immendorff was a member of the German art movement Neue Wilde.

=== Other activities ===
Immendorff created several stage designs, including two for the Salzburg Festival. He designed sets for the operas Elektra and The Rake's Progress. The latter also inspired a series of paintings in which he cast himself as the rake.

In 1984, Immendorff opened the bar La Paloma near the Reeperbahn in Hamburg St. Pauli and created a large bronze sculpture of Hans Albers there. He also contributed to the design of André Heller's avant-garde amusement park "Luna, Luna" in 1987. For three months, from 1987 until 1988, Immendorff was the foreign artist in residence at the Auckland Art Gallery in New Zealand, attracting a lot of attention in the local scene there. Immendorff created various sculptures; one spectacular example is a 25 m tall iron sculpture in the form of an oak tree trunk, erected in Riesa in 1999.

In 2006, Immendorff selected 25 of his paintings for an illustrated Bible. In the foreword he described his belief in God.

== Exhibitions ==
A major 2019 survey began at the Haus der Kunst in Munich and later traveled later to the Museo Reina Sofía in Madrid and the Fondazione Querini Stampalia in Venice, curated by Francesco Bonami.

== Personal life ==
In 2000, Immendorff married his former student Oda Jaune. The two had a daughter, Ida, who was born on 13 August 2001.

In August 2003, Immendorff was caught in the luxury suite of the Steigenberger Parkhotel in Düsseldorf with seven prostitutes (and four more on their way) and some cocaine. More cocaine was found in his studio; all in all, the found substances contained 6.6 grams of pure cocaine, above the legal threshold for personal use. In interviews, Immendorff attempted to explain his actions with his terminal illness and as an expression of his "orientalism" that provided inspiration for his work. He also complained about prostitutes "who don't understand that a good whore does not divulge anything about her clients." He cooperated with the prosecution, admitted to having taken cocaine since the early 1990s and supplied the name of his dealer. At the trial in July 2004, he admitted to having organized 27 similar orgies between February 2001 and August 2003. He was sentenced to 11 months on probation and was fined €150,000. The mild sentence was justified with Immendorff's illness and his extensive confession. He had been suspended from his position at the university but was reinstated after the verdict.

In March 2004, a woman attempted to blackmail Immendorff, threatening to divulge further details of the orgies. Immendorff notified the police and she was arrested. Her trial started in September 2004.

=== Disease and death ===
Immendorff was diagnosed with ALS (Lou Gehrig's disease) in 1998. When he could not paint with his left hand any more, he switched to the right. In 2004 he funded a stipend to research the disease.

In November 2005, he was treated by emergency physicians and was admitted to a hospital, where a tracheotomy had to be performed to help him breathe. As of 2006, he used a wheelchair full-time and did not paint anymore; instead he directed his assistants to paint following his instructions.

On 27 May 2007, at the age of 61, he succumbed to the disease. He died in Düsseldorf and his ashes were scattered in the Mediterranean Sea. In his will, he left his entire estate, estimated at €15–18 million, to his wife. A 12-year-old son from a former relationship who never knew his father went to court over the size of his legitime.

== Recognition ==
In 1997, Immendorf won the world's best endowed art prize at the time, the MARCO prize of the Museum of Contemporary Art in Monterrey, Mexico. In the following year he received the merit medal (Bundesverdienstkreuz) of the Federal Republic of Germany.

Immendorf was considered a friend and the favorite painter of former German Chancellor Gerhard Schröder, who chose him to paint his official portrait for the Federal Chancellery. The portrait, which was completed by Immendorff's assistants, was revealed to the public in January 2007; the massive work has ironic character, showing the former Chancellor in stern heroic pose, in the colors of the German flag, painted in the style of an icon, surrounded by little monkeys. These "painter monkeys" were a recurring theme in Immendorff's work, serving as an ironic commentary on the artist's business.

== Art market ==
In 2008, the Estate of the Artist contested the authenticity of a work that was offered at an auction, and the work was withdrawn from the sale. The artist's widow sought permission to have the work destroyed, which was granted in 2012 after the work was declared a fake. The original owner of the piece contested this ruling, and in 2014 the High Regional Court of Düsseldorf overruled the decision, claiming the authenticity of the work was “irrelevant.”

The most expensive painting by the artist in the art market was Ende gut, alles gut (All's Well that Ends Well) (1983), who sold at Sotheby's London, on 7 February 2007, by $567,272.
