= Michael Hofmann (sumi-e) =

American artist, teacher and sumi-e painter

Michael Hofmann is an artist and teacher. He has been an active sumi-e painter since moving from the United States to Japan in 1972. For 33 years Hofmann worked closely with Jikihara Gyokusei (1904-2005), the prominent sumi-e painter, Abbot of Kokusei-ji Temple, Awajishima and Director of Japan's National Association of Nanga Painters. Hofmann has taught sumi-e ink painting at universities, museums and cultural institutions in both Japan and the United States. He has illustrated numerous books and his work has been exhibited extensively in galleries and museums.

Born
July 4, 1948

Oakland, California

Nationality
American
Field
Artist, Teacher
Education
1970 BA UC Santa Barbara

Studied (Buddhist Sculpture) with Ratna Kaji Sakya, Kathmandu, Nepal 1970-71

33 Year Apprenticeship to Sumi Painter, Abbot Jikihara Gyokusei (1972-2005)

Website
official website

== Biography ==
While completing his degree in Asian Studies with a focus on eastern religions, Hofmann met Zen priest and calligrapher Shibayama Zenkei Roshi (1894-1974), Abbot of the Nanzen-ji Temple. The Abbot inspired him to visit the East and Hofmann soon embarked on an overland voyage through central Asia to Nepal, stopping in Kathmandu for five months where he studied Buddhist sculpture. After returning to the U.S. Hofmann worked as a museum guard in San Francisco to earn money for his passage to Japan where Shibayama Zenkei introduced him to his friend, painting master and poet Jikihara Gyokusei. Hofmann worked, and traveled with Jikihara until the master’s death in 2005. Shibayama also introduced him to Antaiji, a Zen temple where he was allowed to join the monks in their meditation practice. Hofmann’s rigorous Zen practice quickly became integral to the "sincerity’ and "honesty" of his sumi-e painting style. He periodically left Japan to travel through villages and cities in Asia, Latin America, and Europe, capturing what he saw with brush and ink.

== Collaborations ==
Hofmann’s worldwide wanderings reminded Jikihara of the mendicant, eccentric, sake-loving Zen monk Santoka Taneda (1882-1940) and he suggested they do a series of works based on the monk’s haiku. The 1988 Osaka exhibition of Hofmann’s 30 brush paintings, with Jikihara’s calligraphic rendering of the haiku interwoven into them was the first collaborative exhibition by master and student.[4] They later exhibited work together at the Gyokusei Museum, Awajishima[5] and at the Hakusa Sonso Villa in Kyoto. Toward the end of Jikihara’s life, Hofmann worked with him on large murals, often painting areas toward the top that his elderly teacher could no longer reach.[6] Hofmann also collaborated and exhibited Shigajiku, with Fukushima Keido,[7] the abbot of Kyoto’s Tofukuji Temple[8]

== Style ==
Unlike traditional apprenticeships in China and Japan, Jikihara encouraged Hofmann to create his own compositions and develop his own style. "Even while his drawings are so much imbued with Japanese style, they have a vivacity of line, stroke and expression which is very personal." With time, Hofmann’s work branched out into oils and other media and his brushwork began to push traditional limits. He also introduced "subjects not common to the sumi-e genre, like erotic nudes and urban landscapes." His paintings’ "bold strokes, forceful gestures and energy… catch a moment or a mood undistracted" making "emotions palpable."

== Teaching ==
As a teacher, Hofmann has pointed to similarities between brush painting and the action painting of American Abstract Expressionists. In workshops and lectures, including those at San Francisco’s Asian Art Museum, The Los Angeles County Museum of Art, Brown University, and the San Francisco Zen Center, Hofmann has emphasized the use of upper body movement to augment expressiveness. In 2011 Hofmann moved back to the United States and settled in Sonoma County, California where he paints, teaches "Breakaway Sumi-e", and continues his Zen practice at the Pacific Zen Institute.

== Notable exhibitions ==
- 1987 Shibunkaku Royal Gallery, Kyoto. Japan
- 1988 Sumoto City Museum, Awajishima, Japan
- 1994 Sumoto City Museum, Awajishima, Japan
- 1997 Honen-in Temple, Kyoto, Japan
- 2004 Gyokusei Museum, Awajishima, Japan
- 2008 Kyoto Museum, Japan
- 2010 Gallery Sala, Kyoto, Japan
- 2011 Mario Uribe Backstreet Gallery, Santa Rosa CA
- 2012 San Francisco Zen Center, CA

== Installations ==
- 1988 Renshouji Zen Temple, Nara, Japan Making the Zen Mind in Light and Dark Patterns: American Sumi-e Painter tackles the wall painting at Nara’s Renshouji Temple Yomiuri Newspaper evening edition, August 10, 1988
- 1998 Reiganji Zen Temple, Toyota City, Japan
- 1998 Seitai-an Zen Temple, Kyoto, Japan
- 2005 Folding screens, Daishu-in West Renzai Zen Temple, Garberville, California
- 2006 Sowing the Moon Teahouse, San Francisco Zen Center, Green Gulch Farm, Muir Beach, California

== Book and Magazine Illustrations ==
- San Francisco, Urban Interludes, Mainichi Daily News, November 6, 1987, p. 9
- The Song in the Dream of the Hermit, by David Jenkins, Kyoto Journal, No. 24, 1993, pp. 40–45.
- Hojoki, Visions of a Torn World translated by Yasuhiko Moriguchi & David Jenkins, Stone Bridge Press (1996) ISBN 9780893469856 .
- Simmering Away, Songs from the Kanginshu translated by Yasuhiko Moriguchi & David Jenkins, White Pine Press (2006) ISBN 9781893996496.
- Hidden Buddhas, a Novel of Karma & Chaos by Liza Dalby, Stonebridge Press (2009) ISBN 978-1-933330-85-3.
- The Sayings of Layman P'ang, a Zen Classic of China translated by James Green, Shambhala Publications (2009) ISBN 978-1-59030-630-7.
- The Zen Teaching of Homeless Kodo, by Kosho Uchiyama and Shohaku Okumura, Wisdom Publications (2014) ISBN 978-1-61429-048-3.
- Deepest Practice, Deepest Wisdom: Three Fascicles from Shobogenzo with Commentaries, by Kosho Uchiyama, translated by Daitsu Tom Wright and Shohaku Okumura, Wisdom Publications (2018) ISBN 978-1-61429-302-6.
- About a Poem, by Pico Iyer, Shambhala Sun, September, 2009, p. 104
- Michael's Muse, by Pico Iyer, Kyoto Journal no. 41, 1999, p. 21
- The Lady and the Monk, Four Seasons in Kyoto, review by Paul Wadden, Kyoto Journal no. 20, 1992, pp. 64–65
- Blue-eyed Kyotoite: Michael Hofmann, Kyoto Monthly, November, 1988, pp. 32–33
- Michael D. Hofmann, Nanga painter living in a community rich with a sense of seasons, by Miyuki Kurata, Kyoto Monthly, June, 1999, p. 60
- Going Beyond Cultural Borders: Michael Hofmann: Pursuing both Sumi-e and Sculpture, by Kazuko Tazaki, Visiting the Beauty of Japan, February 4, 2003, p. 41
- Sumi-e Painter Michael Hofmann, reviving the way to live in an old traditional house, by Akira Fujita, writer and illustrator Nishijin Graph, July 2000 Vol. 518, pp. 12–13

== Classes and Workshops ==
- San Francisco Asian Art Museum 2011, Sept 24th San Francisco Asian Art Museum Class
- Los Angeles County Museum of Art June, 2011 LACMA workshop
- Sonoma County Museum
- Brown University
- Mount Holyoke College
- Colby-Sawyer College
- Pacific Zen Institute, Santa Rosa
- San Francisco Zen Center
- Sebastopol Center for the Arts
