= Romina de Novellis =

- Born: 1982 (age 43–44); Naples, Italy
- Website: http://www.romina-denovellis.com/

Romina De Novellis (born in 1982 in Naples, Italy) is an Italian performance and visual artist and holds a PhD in Anthropology from the École des hautes études en sciences sociales (EHESS). Based in Paris since 2008, she has developed an artistic practice centered on performance, the body, and anthropology.

She teaches performance and gender studies and regularly leads workshops at higher education institutions, including Paris 1 Panthéon-Sorbonne University, the Reims School of Art and Design (ESAD), Mount Holyoke College (Massachusetts, United States), and the Academy of Fine Arts of Reggio Calabria, notably as part of the DARDEC project in Morocco in partnership with the French Institute.

She is the founder of DOMUS Artist Residency, an artist residency located in Galatina (Lecce, Italy), and of Atelier Essenza, a non-profit association based in Paris and registered under the French 1901 Association Law.

Her work has been presented in several artistic institutions, including the Centre Pompidou, Jeu de Paume, Palais de Tokyo, MADRE Museum in Naples, and the Poznań Biennale.

== Biography ==
=== Early life and education ===
Romina De Novellis was born in 1982 in Naples, Italy. She grew up in Rome, where she developed an interest in dance and theatre. In 1999, she obtained a certification from the Royal Academy of Dance in London, and later pursued studies in Arts, Music and Performing Arts (DAMS) at Roma Tre University.

She worked as an assistant director with Luigi Squarzina at the Teatro dell'Opera in Rome.

A scooter accident in 2004 marked a turning point in her artistic path. She then turned to performance art and developed a practice focused on the body and public space.

=== Move to Paris ===
Based in Paris since 2008, she has developed an approach at the intersection of contemporary art, performance, and anthropology. She has conducted research in anthropology and sociology at the École des hautes études en sciences sociales (EHESS), particularly on the anthropology of the body.

=== Artistic career ===
Since the late 2000s, Romina De Novellis has developed a performative practice based on endurance, repetition, and immersion. Her works take the form of site-specific performances, participatory actions, and documentary installations (photography and video).

== Artistic approach ==
=== The body as language ===
Romina De Novellis's practice is based on the body as a tool of expression. Her performances mobilize gesture, repetition, and endurance in a non-verbal perspective.

=== Anthropological approach and Mediterranean memory ===
Her work is grounded in an anthropological approach to Mediterranean cultures. She draws on rituals, traditions, and symbols to question cultural transmission and identities.

=== Ecofeminism and social critique ===
Her work is part of an ecofeminist perspective, examining the relationships between domination of bodies, patriarchal structures, and exploitation of living beings.

== Main works ==
- La Gabbia (2012), 7.5 Club, Paris
- La Veglia (2012), Paris
- Gradiva (2017), Archaeological Park of Pompeii
- Luna Park (2018), Labanque, Béthune
- Arachne (2018), RAMDOM / Lastation, Gagliano del Capo
- Il gioco della Campana (2018; reactivated in 2022 at Jeu de Paume)
- The Last Supper Project (2021), Italian Cultural Institute, Paris
- Eurydice (2021), Museum of Hunting and Nature, Paris
- Volare oh oh! Cantare oh oh oh oh! (2022), Jeu de Paume, Paris
- Bella Ciao (2023), Jeu de Paume, Paris

== Exhibitions and performances ==
=== Institutions and museums ===
- 2024: STAR – 100% Italian Origin, Centre Pompidou, Paris
- 2023: Bella Ciao, Jeu de Paume, Paris
- 2022: Volare oh oh, cantare oh oh oh oh, Jeu de Paume, Paris
- 2022: Il gioco della Campana, Jeu de Paume, Paris
- 2022: Del maiale non si butta via niente, Jeu de Paume, Paris
- 2022: Tou.te.s Sorcières, MAC VAL
- 2021: The Last Supper, Italian Cultural Institute, Paris
- 2016: DNA/ADN, Museum of Arts and Crafts
- 2015: Inferno, Palais de Tokyo

=== Festivals, biennials and events ===
- 2023: Voulez-vous danser avec moi ? Merci je ne préfère pas, Paris+ by Art Basel, Tuileries Garden, Paris
- 2022: La Pecora, Roma Arte in Nuvola, Rome
- 2016: Ger, Land Art Mongolia Biennial
- 2015: Na Cl O, Something Else Off Biennale Cairo
- 2014: Augurii – The Artist in the Natural Habitat of Vultures, FIAC Hors les Murs, Paris

== Residencies and collaborative projects ==
=== Artistic residencies ===
- 2021: Residency at the Camargo Foundation (program with EHESS), project The Last Supper Project
- 2021: DOMUS Artist Residency, project Si tu m’aimes, protège-moi
- 2018: Arachne residency, Fondazione Ramdom, Italy

=== Collaborative projects ===
- The Last Supper Project (since 2021), interdisciplinary project bringing together artists and researchers
- Luna Park (2018), participatory project developed in Naples

== Critical reception ==
Romina De Novellis's work has been the subject of articles and reviews in national and international press.

=== National and international press ===
- The New York Times (2016) mentions the performance La Veglia presented at Artissima in Turin.
- The Art Newspaper (2016) published an article on La Veglia at Artissima.
- Artnet News (2016) covered La Gabbia at the Armory Show in New York.
- ArtNews (2016) also mentioned La Gabbia at the Armory Show.
- Art critic Valérie Duponchelle published an article in Le Figaro (2015) on the performance Inferno at Palais de Tokyo.
- Libération (2015) reviewed the solo exhibition To Be, or Not To Be in Paris.
- Le Monde (2015) also published an article on this exhibition.
- Beaux Arts Magazine published several articles about her work, notably on La Gabbia (2016) and the participatory project #ChezMaddalena (2020).
- In 2020, Euronews featured a report on her artistic project developed during lockdown in Paris.
