= Renata Jaworska =

Polish contemporary visual artist

- Born: 1979 (age 46–47); Zwoleń, Poland
- Education: Kunstakademie Düsseldorf, Düsseldorf, Germany
- Known for: Painting, drawing
- Notable work: Maps and territories (2017–2021)
- Movement: Contemporary art
- Website: www.renatajaworska.com

Renata Jaworska (born 1979) is a Polish contemporary visual artist. She lives and works in Düsseldorf and Salem, Germany.

== Early life and education ==
While still a student of the Józef Chelmoński High School of Fine Arts in Nałęczów, Jaworska visited the exhibition "Znaki, symbolei wizje"(Sings, Symbols and Visions) by Jörg Immendorff at the National Museum in Warsaw in 1998. This influenced the choice of her future academy and master. After graduating from high school at 19 she was accepted at the Kunstakademie Düsseldorf and she moved to Germany to study.

From 2000 to 2006, she studied at the Kunstakademie Düsseldorf art history under Prof. Werner Spies, Prof. Siegfried Gohr and painting in the class of Prof. Jörg Immendorff as his master student. In 2006 she received her academy diploma with distinction from Prof. Peter Doig at the Kunstakademie Düsseldorf.

During her studies she designed the stage design for the one-act operatic monologue La voix humaine, by Jean Cocteau and Francis Poulenc. This project was created as part of the collaboration between the Kunstakademie Düsseldorf, Robert Schumann Hochschule Düsseldorf and the Deutsche Oper am Rhein. The opera was performed in the auditorium of the Kunstakademie Düsseldorf in 2002 after the opening speech for the Rundgang by the rector of Kunstakademie Düsseldorf, Markus Lüpertz.

== Work ==
Renata Jaworska has been dealing with literary works since 2017. Her exhibition "Maps and Territories" (based on the novel by Michel Houellebecq) is displayed at Biuro Wystaw Artystycznych w Kielcach featuring a series of the paintings with the theme of mapping and territory. In Jaworska's work, the maps are source material to examine themes of belonging through the topographies and districts. The starting point for her was the map material that, thanks to the Internet and smartphones, is now available in all various scales and sections, even for remote regions. While planning a trip, studying maps of unfamiliar territories remains a practical tool. It allows travelers to familiarize themselves with roads, boarders, and topographic features, enabling them to plan routes, evaluate distances, and identify the most efficient or scenic paths. This act of engaging with maps can be seen as a form of appropriation, transforming unfamiliar spaces into familiar, navigable ones.

At Galeria 58, she showed a series of works created for this exhibition. She investigated the relation between sound and space. She was looking for answers about belonging to a certain territory, religion and society. The start for these new works was the bell donated by her great-great-grandfather Jan Skrzypczak to the garrison church of Sw. Stanislaw in Radom. Between 2018 and 2019, numerous drawings as well as large-scale works on paper are created. Jaworska deals in these years with the theme: "localization". The artist let the viewer of her works look at an area from a bird's eye view, at urban structures, cartographically defined. But they are not scaled down images of a place, although they find their basis in real map material. Urban structures with their streets and areas are clearly recognizable in their layout, but they are not differentiated further.

Jaworska works in a variety of media, including drawing, painting, film, objects and interventions in public spaces. Her works are exhibited internationally, most recently including Kunsthalle Düsseldorf in 2019, 5th Biennale of Drawing in Nuremberg in 2019, Museum of Villingen-Schwenningen, Germany 2019, BWA w Kielcach in 2018, Dumbo Arts Festival , Brooklyn NY in 2014, L'Esposizione Internazionale d'arte "Piccola Germania" Mostra Internazionale, Lido di Venezia in 2009.

Her works are in numerous private and public collections.

== Exhibitions ==
Beginning with her first institutional show, Von Pferden und Affen, at the Museum Ludwig in Koblenz in 2007, Jaworska also had a solo exhibition at the Romanian Embassy in Warsaw in 2008, super Land, super Rheinland in Museum Ratingen in 2018 and the "Maps and Territories" based on a novel by Michel Houellebecq at the Biuro Wystaw Artystycznych BWA w Kielcach in 2018.

Jaworska received several grants in Germany, Poland, Slovenia, Greece and the US. In 2007 she was a scholarship holder of the Lepsien Art Foundation Luxemburg / UAE. During her stay in London in 2010, she created the video project "119-minute-circle. The International Congress at the Whitechapel Gallery" which was presented at the Kunstmuseum Pablo Picasso in Münster in 2018 as a part of the large-scale project "Peace" and "Rethinking Guernica" at the Museo Reina Sofia, among others. Jaworska was selected for a project in collaboration with, among others, National Museum of Contemporary History MNZS Ljubljana in Slovenia, Galeria Labirynt in Lublin, Poland and National Museum of Contemporary Art Athens EMST in Greece.
