= Ronald Suchiu =

Canadian painter and entrepreneur

Ronald Suchiu (born October 5, 1952; last name pronounced "Soo-choo") is a Canadian painter based in Essex Ontario Canada. A painter from a young age, he is a realist and surrealist painter. Many of his works have been made in partnership with celebrities and organizations often with the goal of raising money for charities such as the David Suzuki Foundation and the Jane Goodall Institute

== Early life ==
Suchiu gained an interest in art at a young age. Growing up in LaSalle Ontario, he sold his first painting at the age of 10. He was initially inspired by the works of Leonardo da Vinci, eventually developing his own style by combining the techniques of DaVinci with techniques used by other admired artists, such as Salvador Dalli and Norman Rockwell.

== Career ==
Through an anonymous friend, Suchiu was able to send a gift to Queen Elizabeth II through Canada's Governor General. The queen owned 16 horses that were descendants of the race horse Man O' War, so Suchiu sent her a framed Limited edition print of his painting featuring the horse.

A print of a painting by Suchiu art also hangs in the office of the curator of Vatican Library. While the curator was touring Our Lady of the Assumption Church in Windsor Ontario, a print of Suchiu's painting of that same church was presented along with a letter containing 23,000 signatures from Catholic elementary school students.

== Charity work ==
Suchiu has raised over 1.5 million dollars for various charities including the following:

- The Challenge Cup
- The Cystic Fibrosis Foundation
- Jane Goodall Institute
- The Red Cross
- The Rotary club
- The Downtown Mission
- David Suzuki Foundation
- Easter Seal Society
- Humane Society
- Transition to Betterness

== Celebrity partnerships ==
Suchiu has worked with celebrities including the following:

- Sting
- Jane Goodall
- Dan Aykroyd
- Gordon Lightfoot
- Jack Lemmon
- Eric Burdon
- George Lucas

== Synergy art ==
Over the course of his career, Suchiu claims to have invented a new art form that he labels "Synergy Art". The artform involves an artist providing a partner with a canvas painted over with a colored background. The partner will paint across the canvas however they see fit. Then, the artist takes the canvas and completes the work of art, creating a final image completely unique to the partnership.

Suchiu initially came up with the idea while working on a painting of Ken Kessey's Merry Pranksters and Their bus named Further. Later, Suchiu produced the first official Synergy painting with Dan Aykroyd while signing prints with him at Aykroyd's farm house. Currently 6 official Synergy pieces have been completed by Suchiu
