= Peter Kuckei =

German painter and stained glass artist

- Born: 25 May 1938; Husum, Germany
- Died: 13 May 2023 (aged 84); Leer, Lower Saxony, Germany
- Occupation(s): painter and stained glass artist

Peter Kuckei (25 May 1938 – 13 May 2023) was a German painter and stained glass artist.

== Biography ==
Peter Kuckei was born on 25. Mai 1938 in Husum district Nordfriesland, Germany close to the North Sea.

From 1960 to 1961 Peter Kuckei studied at the Staatliche Akademie der Bildenden Künste in Bremen, as well as from 1961 to 1963 at the Staatliche Akademie der Bildenden Künste in Stuttgart with Prof. H. Wildemann. Peter Kuckei lectured from 1986 to 1987 at the Staatliche Akamdemie der Bildenden Künste in Stuttgart, Germany. From 1963 to 1993 he lived and worked in Berlin and Butjadingen. In 1993 he opened a studio in San Francisco, California, United States. After ten years he moved to Miami, Florida, where he lived and worked. In 2009 he returned to Germany and lived and worked again in Butjadingen, close on the North Sea coast. He died on 13 May 2023 in Leer, Lower Saxony, which means that he had spent most of his life close to the sea.

== Collections ==
His work is included in the collection of the Fine Arts Museums of San Francisco.
