= Arnaud Cohen =

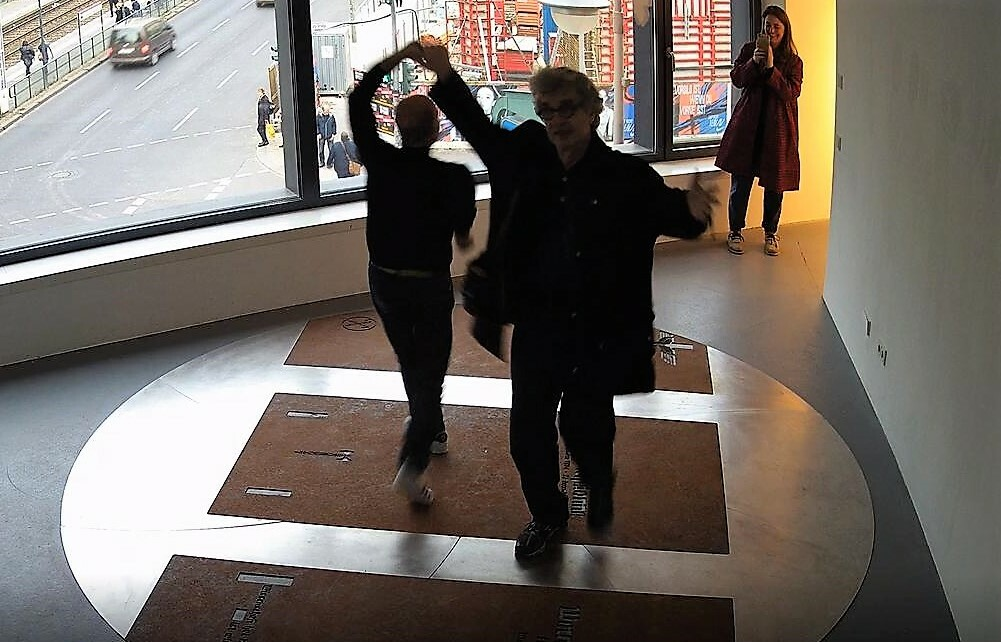
- Wim Wenders performing with Arnaud Cohen on Cohen's Dance over me, at Kunstverein am Rosa Luxemburg Platz, Berlin, Germany, October 2017
- Born: Arnaud Cohen; January 28, 1968 (age 58); Paris, France
- Known for: Artist

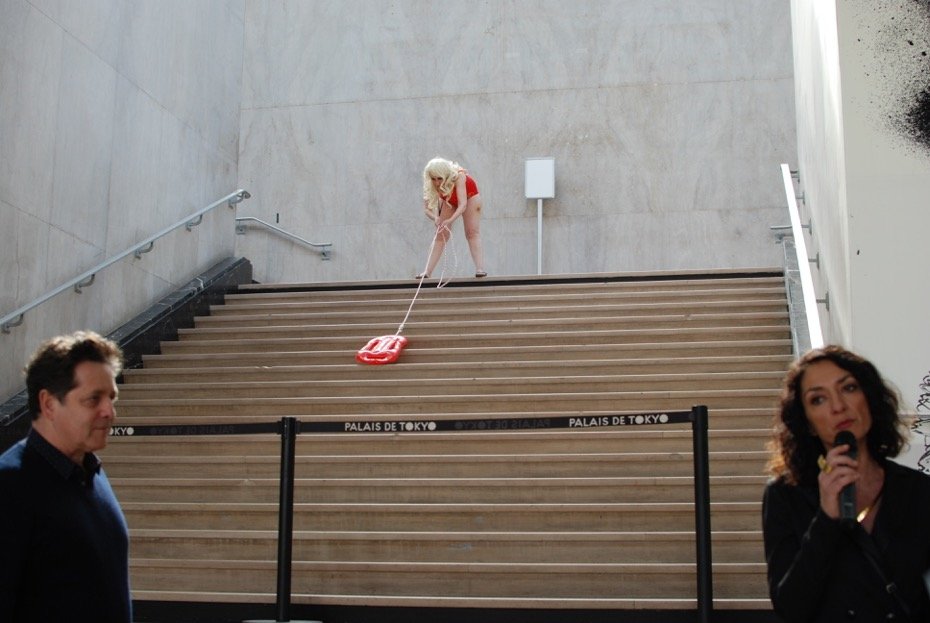
Sisyphus is a woman—Arnaud Cohen's performance presented by Jean de Loisy and Vittoria Matarrese, Palais de Tokyo, Paris, 2016.

Arnaud Cohen (born January 28, 1968) is a French contemporary artist, sculptor, and visual artist.

== Biography ==
Presented in 2015 by the daily Le Figaro, Arnaud Cohen began his career as a visual artist in 1997 by integrating with the Marwan Hoss gallery (Paris and Brussels). Marwan Hoss was then also Vice President of the International Fair of Contemporary Art. After a setback following the partial closure of the Marwan Hoss Gallery in 2000, Cohen was back at work in 2005.

His practice is close to twentieth-century propaganda practices used both in the 1920s and 1930s in Russia and Germany and also in the late 1960s and 1970s to serve the proletarian cause (hence his exhibiting on the occasion of May 68 commemorations side by side with Gérard Fromanger, Jean-Jacques Lebel, and Erró at the Salvador gallery, an exhibition curated by collector Yves Cothouit), but also since the 1950s to serve the commodification of goods and services. Cohen, like Jeff Koons, uses the popular alphabet, but he uses these letters to write words.

== Major pieces ==
=== Dance over me ===
The Dance over me World Tour series, in their different versions (CCTV recording, and the transportable versions), are experimental attempts to produce a "trace" of the past. After the 2017 Dansez sur moi that addressed Western Europe elites' rally around the Nazi regime (exhibited in Berlin and Paris), Tangover Me Buenos Aires and Tangover Me Rosario address the Argentinian dictatorship between 1976 and 1983.

The work borrows from Carl Andre's minimal floor pieces. It consists of an iron dance floor made of fake graves of real Nazi collaborators, those of Maurice Rocher, Jean Bichelonne, and Wernher von Braun.

Dansez sur moi, exhibited in 2017 at the Rosa Luxemburg Platz Kunstverein in Berlin, was then presented in 2018 in Paris at the Memorial de la Shoah, in 2019 at Le Confort Moderne in Poitiers, France, and at the UNTREF Museum in Buenos Aires, Argentina.

=== Art Speaks For Itself (ASFI) ===
In 2014, Cohen created Art Speaks For Itself (ASFI). ASFI runs a network of residences for curators. Cohen inaugurated in September 2014 his first residence in Paris and a second one in Milan the following year. The first guest was Wang Chunchen, curator in charge of the Chinese pavilion at the last Venice Biennale in 2013. The curatorial protocol of ASFI was applied in 2018 to the feminist exhibition of the Tate dedicated to the writings of Virginia Woolf curated by Laura Smith (now curator at the Whitechapel Gallery in London), and in 2015 at one of the shows exhibited by the MUNTREF, Museum of Contemporary Art in Buenos Aires. Arnaud Cohen was invited to perform this work in 2015 at Something Else off Cairo Biennale in 2015 and at the Dakar Biennale in 2016 by curator Simon Njami. Cohen was invited to the 2017 Venice Biennale by Koyo Kouho (Swiss pavilion Pro Helvetia) and the same year, also at the Biennale of South America, BIENALSUR, by Anibal Jozami and Diana Wechsler.

In 2016, ASFI had a public presentation at the Centre Pompidou, on the initiative of Alicia Knock as part of Museum On / Of in 2017 at the Untref Museum of Buenos Aires and at the Château de Montsoreau-Museum of Contemporary Art as part of the event.

=== Big Red Kiss ===
In 2007, Cohen had enlarged a bottle of Coke (10 feet tall) and reduced airliners. It was intended to show the struggles embodied by the events of September 11 attacks.
