= Saskia Holmkvist =

Swedish artist

- Born: 1971
- Website: saskiaholmkvist.com

Saskia Holmkvist (born 1971) is a conceptual artist from Sweden, working mainly with video. She is best known for the short films "System" (2001) and "Interview With Saskia Holmkvist" (2005).

== Notable works ==
- Interview With Saskia Holmkvist (2005)
- System (2001)
