= Marc-Olivier Wahler =

Swiss curator, art critic, and museum director

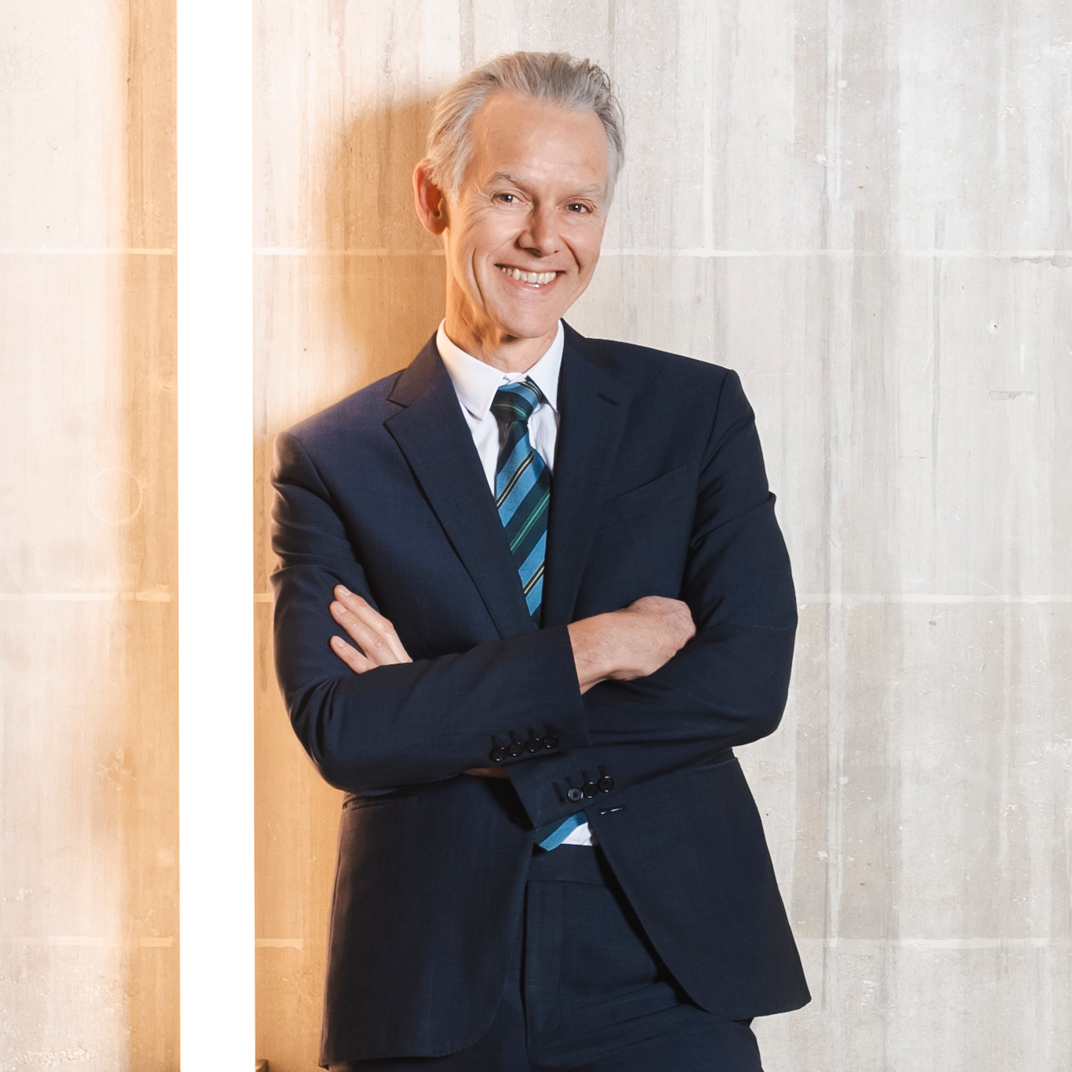
Image of Marc-Olivier Wahler

Marc-Olivier Wahler (born 1964, in Neuchâtel, Switzerland) is a Swiss curator and contemporary art critic and art historian. He is the director of the MAH Musée d’art et d’histoire in Geneva. He is the former director of the Eli and Edythe Broad Art Museum at Michigan State University in East Lansing, Michigan, the former director of Palais de Tokyo, Paris, the former director of the Swiss Institute, New York, and the co-founding director of the Centre d’art Neuchâtel, Switzerland. He is also the former artistic advisor of De Appel Arts Center, Amsterdam, the former artistic advisor for CI Contemporary Istanbul, the founding editor of Palais/ magazine], the founding director of the Chalet Society and PAL (Paris Art Lab), Paris; and founding director of Transformer Sculpture Park, Melides, Portugal.

== Life and career ==
After having studied philosophy and art history in Neuchâtel, Lausanne and Geneva, he began his career as a museum curator in 1992 at the Cantonal Museum of Fine Arts in Lausanne and then at MAMCO in Geneva. In 1995, he co-founded the CAN (Art Center of Neuchâtel) and was its director until 2000, when he became the director of the Swiss Institute in New York (2000–2006), the director of Palais de Tokyo in Paris (2006–2012), the founding director of Chalet Society in Paris (2012–2016), the director of Eli and Edythe Broad Art Museum in Michigan (2016–2019) and, since 2019, the director of MAH Musée d’art et d’histoire in Geneva.

During the last twenty years, Wahler has organized over 400 exhibitions.

=== CAN – Centre d'art Neuchâtel ===
Wahler co-founded CAN Centre d’art Neuchâtel, Switzerland in 1995, and ran it until 2000. Under his artistic directorship, CAN organized solo shows with Gianni Motti (1995), Olivier Mosset (1996), Jonathan Monk (1997), Steven Parrino (1998), and Roman Signer (1999). Group shows included artists such as Philippe Parreno (1995), Franz West (1995), Sadie Benning (1995), Fischli & Weiss (1996), Mike Kelley (1996), Paul McCarthy (1996), Ugo Rondinone (1996), Matthew Ritchie (1997), Pavel Pepperstein (1999), and Robert McCollum (1999).

=== Swiss Institute, New York ===
From 2000 to 2006, Wahler ran the Swiss Institute in New York and curated large projects with artists such as Christoph Büchel, Jim Shaw, Ugo Rondinone, Valentin Carron, Urs Fischer, Takashi Murakami, Martin Creed, and Aleksandra Mir.

=== Palais de Tokyo, Paris ===
From 2006–2012, Wahler was the director of the Palais de Tokyo, one of the most frequently visited contemporary art centers in Europe. Wahler is known for creating a museum that breaks down barriers between high and low culture and different artistic mediums (such as architecture, fine arts, dance, literature, theatre, and music).

As director of Palais de Tokyo, he set the current pace of 30 to 40 exhibitions a year. The solo shows have included such artists as Tatiana Trouvé, Peter Coffin, Steven Parrino, Jonathan Monk, Roman Signer, Christoph Büchel, Paul Laffoley, Joe Coleman, Loris Gréaud, Charlotte Posenenske, Micol Assael, Ceal Floyer, Michel Blazy, Ulla von Brandenburg, Camille Henrot, and Oscar Tuazon.

Wahler's first show at Palais de Tokyo was Five Billion Years (2006), which served as a prologue for his six-year curatorial program. His later group shows dealt with the limits between what is visible and invisible: M, News from the Upside-Down (2007), La Marque Noire (2007), Superdome (2008), Gakona (2009), and Spy Numbers (2009). Next, Chasing Napoleon (2009–2010) examined the notion of disappearance.

In 2011, Wahler curated Dynasty with Fabrice Hergott, the director of the Museum of Modern Art, Paris. They exhibited a total of 80 works from 40 French artists under the age of 35 in both the Palais de Tokyo and the Museum of Modern Art, Paris. In addition to Dynasty, Wahler created the Modules, a series of art exhibits which focused on emergent artists. He also created the "Carte Blanche", a still ongoing series which give an artist the opportunity to present a special project covering the entirety of the exhibition space of Palais de Tokyo and offering a kind of map of the artist's brain, desires and influences. A review noted that "under Mr. Wahler, the Palais de Tokyo has become one of the city’s best springboards for young artists."

Wahler is also known for adding a rooftop hotel and a rooftop restaurant, to the already existent bookstore and restaurant Tokyo-eat. He installed the Lang and Baumann artist project Everland Hotel (a one-room hotel room available to the public) on the museum's roof. Wahler removed Everland after a year and replaced it with Laurent Grasso's artist project Nomiya, a one-room restaurant for 12 people.

=== Chalet Society, Paris ===
Wahler is the founder and director of a new structure, The Chalet Society, designed to encourage reflection on contemporary art institutions and to investigate new possibilities for exhibitions by testing forms, spaces, discourses, and protocols. The mobile structure endeavors to develop formats that work on a variety of platforms, similar to open source software that can run on any hardware. The Chalet Society reacts to the boldest artistic settings and acts itself as a community of artists, collectors, researchers, and other enthusiasts, searching for “poetic consciousness,” an idea attributed to Saul Wahl Katzenellenbogen – crowned King of Poland in 1587. He only reigned for one night but had enough time to pronounce a number of predictions and appeal for the dawn of “poetic consciousness.”

Launched in October 2012 in a pop-up site – a disused school in the heart of Paris – the Chalet Society presented a variety of extraordinary self-taught or unknown artists in collaboration with the Museum of Everything.

After having tested the limits of the commonly accepted notion of artist, the Chalet Society created the “Tester’s Salon” in the summer of 2013, a project by the art critic Christophe Kihm and the artists Arnaud and Bertrand Dezoteux. Here more than 40 artists were invited to reflect on testing an extensive range of exhibition formats.

In fall 2013 after the self-taught ‘outsider’ artists, the exhibition The Hidden World, designed by the artist Jim Shaw, focused on artists who – while producing for specific commissions – have often got lost behind their intentions. Shaw collected over the past 40 years diverse didactic material, creating “a breathtaking and expansive journey through the myths and beliefs of America.”

=== MSU Broad Museum, East Lansing ===
During his tenure as director of the Eli and Edythe Broad Art Museum at Michigan State University in East Lansing (2016–2019), Marc-Olivier Wahler developed an exhibition program of solo and group presentations. He presented long-anticipated projects, such as retrospectives of Michel Parmentier, as well as Jim Shaw and Mike Kelley; he curated the acclaimed group exhibition The Transported Man, where seminal artists such as Marcel Duchamp, René Magritte, Robert Gober, Anna Maria Maiolino, Charlotte Posenenske, and Paul Thek were in conversation with emerging artists, highlighting meaningful connections between historical and current art forms. He opened new exhibition spaces within the museum, focusing on renowned local artists, the upcoming generation, and “non-Western” artists alike.

With a pace of around 30 shows a year, Marc-Olivier Wahler presented the breadth of contemporary art production, from local to regional, national, and international. With his extensive professional network, he was able to secure distinguished and prominent grants, obtain exceptional loans from leading museums and collectors, and enhanced the collection by purchasing outstanding works, such as the famous Hidden World collection by the artist Jim Shaw, comprising more than 1’000 items.

His first year, he was able to secure a 1 million dollar grant for a new project: the Art Lab, a collaborative and community-oriented venue dedicated to the museum collection and a testing ground for innovative ideas and applied research in what define the museum of the future. Within the University, he was able to start an impressive array of collaborations between artists and researchers, started meaningful projects with the MSU different units, such as Lyman Briggs College of Science, the Planetarium, the College of Music, the Agriculture, Physics, Philosophy, Engineering, Neurology, Entomology, Chemistry, and Biology Departments, among others. He initiated a new identity, brand and communication strategy plan for a collaborative, innovative and inclusive museum thought as a habitat, a gateway and a lab.

=== Independent Curator / writer ===
As an independent curator, Marc-Olivier Wahler has curated numerous group shows, notably the decennial Outdoor Sculpture Exhibition Transfer. Art in Urban Space (Biel, 2000), Liquid Sky (Frac Bourgogne, 2003), OKAY (Grey Art Gallery, NYU, 2003), Medio Dia – Media Noce (Centro Cultural Recoleta, Buenos Aires and Macro, Rosario, 2007), Lost (in LA) (LAMAG, Los Angeles, 2012), and From Triple X to Birdsong (KayneGriffinCorcoran Gallery, Los Angeles, 2013).

As an art critic, Marc-Olivier Wahler regularly writes on contemporary art and its theoretical problematic in international magazines, academic books and exhibition catalogues. His conferences in Europe, Asia, Australia, North Africa, and North and South America primarily focus on the form of the exhibition, the program as a medium, the museum as an ecosystem and the ways we currently speak about art.

== Recognition ==
In 2011, Wahler was decorated as a Chevalier in the French Republic's Order of Arts and Letters. In 2013, he was awarded the Meret Oppenheim Prize, Switzerland highest cultural award in the contemporary arts.
