= Cecchetti =

Cecchetti (pronounced [tʃekˈketti]) is an Italian surname derived from the male given name Cecco. Notable people with the surname include:

- Alberto Cecchetti (born 1944), Sammarinese politician
- Alex Cecchetti (born 1977), Italian artist, poet and choreographer
- Domenico Cecchetti (born 1941), Sammarinese cyclist
- Elisa Cecchetti (born 1995), Italian softball player
- Enrico Cecchetti (1850–1928), Italian ballet dancer, ballet teacher and mime
- Giorgio Cecchetti (born 1944), Sammarinese alpine skier
- Luca Cecchetti (born 1990), Italian kickboxer
- Silvia Cecchetti (born 1970), Italian singer
- Silvia Cecchetti (born 1972), Sammarinese politician
- Simone Cecchetti (born 1973), Italian photographer
- Stephen G. Cecchetti (born 1956), American economist and academic

== See also ==
- Cecchetti method
- Cecchetti Society
- Cecchettin
- Cecchetto
