= Alexandru Zaharia =

Alexandru Zaharia may refer to:

- Alexandru Zaharia (footballer, born 1990), Romanian football winger
- Alexandru Zaharia (footballer, born 2000), Romanian football forward for Cetatea Suceava

== See also ==
- Alexandra Zaharias (1929-2024), American ballet teacher
