= Tuna fishing (disambiguation) =

Tuna fishing is the commercial practice of fishing for tuna.

Tuna Fishing may also refer to:

- Tuna Fishing (painting) by Salvador Dali
- La pêche du thon ('Tuna Fishing'), an etching by Jean-Pierre Houël
