= Prix Fondation d'entreprise Ricard =

French art prize

The Ricard Prize (or Prix Ricard S.A.) was founded in 1999 and in 2006 its name changed to Prix Fondation d’Entreprise Ricard. The prize is awarded each year during the Parisian art fair FIAC by a committee of French collectors (friends of the Centre Pompidou, Jeu de Paume, Palais de Tokyo, and FRAC Nord-Pas-de-Calais) to an artist under forty featured in an annual group show curated by a different curator each year. The Prize consists of buying an artwork for 10,000 euros minimum from the prize winner, which is then donated to the Musée National d'Art Moderne (Centre Pompidou) to be part of their permanent collection.

== Past recipients ==
- Didier Marcel (1999)
- Natacha Lesueur (2000)
- Tatiana Trouvé (2001)
- Boris Achour (2002)
- Matthieu Laurette (2003)
- Mircea Cantor (2004)
- Loris Gréaud (2005)
- Vincent Lamouroux (2006)
- Christophe Berdaguer & Marie Péjus (2008)
- Raphaël Zarka (2008)
- Ida Tursic & Wilfried Mille (2009)
- Isabelle Cornaro & Benoît Maire (2010)
- Adrien Missika (2011)
- Katinka Bock (2012)
- Lili Reynaud-Dewar (2013)
- Camille Blatrix (2014)
- Pugnaire & Raffini (2015)
- Clément Cogitore (2016)
- Caroline Mesquita (2017)
- Liv Schulman (2018)
- Marcos Avila Forero (2019)
- Boris Kurdi (2020-2021)
- Elsa Werth (2022)

== See also ==
- List of European art awards
