= Alexandra Ballet =

Ballet company in Missouri, US

General information
- Name: Alexandra Ballet
- Year founded: 1949
- Founders: Alexandra Zaharias
- Principal venue: St. Louis, MO
- Website: www.AlexandraBallet.com

Artistic staff
- Artistic director: Alexandra Zaharias
- Ballet mistress: Norma Winslow Gabriel

Other
- Associated schools: Alexandra School of Ballet

The Alexandra Ballet is a pre-professional ballet company in St. Louis, Missouri, founded in 1949, that cultivates top dance talent. The company regularly performs classical ballets including A Midsummer Night's Dream, Pas de Quatre, Les Sylphides, and an annual performance of The Nutcracker. Many guest choreographers have worked with Alexandra Ballet including Marek Cholewa, Petrus Bosman, and Kennet Oberly.

== History ==
In 1949, Alexandra Zaharias first opened the Alexandra School of Ballet at Olive and Boyle in the city of Saint Louis. Prior to 1949, there were few ballet schools or ballet teachers in St. Louis. Alexandra Zaharias decided to go to New York to study under George Balanchine after seeing legendary ballerina Alexandra Danilova dance Swan Lake at the Kiel Opera House. When she returned to St. Louis, she opened the Alexandra School of Ballet.

== Alexandra School of Ballet ==
As a pre-professional ballet school, Alexandra Ballet focuses exclusively on classical ballet. Established in 1949, Alexandra Ballet is the only St. Louis ballet school to continually provide pre-professional ballet training in Vaganova (Russian), Paris Opera (French), Enrico Cecchetti (Italian), Balanchine (American), Bournonville (Danish) ballet techniques. Dance classes range from creative dance and pre-ballet for young dancers just starting out to technical training in academic ballet, pointe work, variations, pas de deux, character, modern, and men's classes, all designed for the serious ballet dancer. All of the school's faculty has been selected with great care and is led by Alexandra Zaharias.

== Today ==
The company is an early member of Regional Dance America (RDA), achieving RDA's highest ranking of "Honor Company" status, and has been host to the Mid-States Regional Dance America Festival. Currently, the company has over 30 dancers that regularly win scholarships and awards each year. The company performs at the Purser Center of Logan University in Chesterfield, Missouri, as well as at the Blanche M. Touhill Performing Arts Center of University of Missouri-St. Louis in Saint Louis, Missouri. Its repertoire consists of both classical and contemporary pieces, as well as its annual December performance of The Nutcracker.

== Professional alumni ==
- Andrea Lucas
- Antonio Douthit
- Chavo Killingsworth
- Cheryl Balbes McIlhon
- Christa Bross
- Dillon Malinski
- Elizabeth Farrell
- Ellen d`Hemecourt
- Emily Stephenitch
- Eugenia Hoeflin
- Jaha Vanderford
- Jane McGary
- Jennifer Deckert
- Jennifer Reed
- Jessica Ruhlin
- Lisa Wolfsberger
- Louise Nadeau
- Makenzie Howe
- Mariko Kumanomido
- Mary-Jean Cowell
- Megan Buckley
- Philip Gardner
- Rachel Peppin
- Rodney Hamilton
- Sara Stockman
- Sarah Little
- Sarah Megel
- Sharon Lampros
- Susan Checkett Heidemann

== Past performances ==
- A Midsummer Night's Dream 1993, 1999, 2006, 2013
- Alice in Wonderland 2003
- Ballare 1989
- Charminade 1986
- Cinderella 2009
- Concerto 1988
- Concerto Polonaise 1993, 1999
- Coppelia 2001, 2008, 2014
- de l'innocence 2007
- Don Quixote Suite 2010
- Elagiague 1997
- Esmeralda 2005
- Fete Polonaise 1987
- Horra Tango 2009
- The Firebird 2007
- Flute Fantasy 1999
- Frescoes 1997
- Giselle 1990, 1999, 2010
- Good Gracious, Gershwin! 1994
- Diana and Actheon Pas de Deux 1992
- Happy Ending 1991
- Harlequinade 1999, 2005
- Kermes in Bruges 2010
- Konservatoriet 2008
- L'Audition Impromptu 1994
- La Bayadere (Kingdom of the Shades) 1993, 2005
- La Fille Mal Gardee 2002
- Larks and Follies 1987
- Le Corsaire (Pas de Deux) 2005
- Le Jardin Animee 1996, 2013
- Leib der Tanz 1991
- Les Patineurs 2008
- Les Sylphides 1994, 1999, 2009
- Moldavian Suite 2007
- Nutcracker (annually)
- Napoli 2007
- Odyssey 1990
- Origami 1993, 2000
- Pagosiana 2005
- Paquita 1991, 2006
- Pas de Quatre 1985, 1988, 2000, 2007
- Peter and the Wolf 1990
- Pezzi per Ametisto 1993
- Pollaca Guerriera 2008
- Quartet 1989
- Reflections of Childhood 1992
- Rinforzando 1991
- Rodeo 1998
- Rumors 1995
- Sinfonetta 1990
- Swan Lake 1996, 2005 (Pas de Deux, Act II)
- Symphonic Danse 1991
- The Sleeping Beauty 1998, 2004, 2012
- Totenlieder 1987
- Triangulum 1992
- Trio For Four 1989
- Unplugged 2010
- Untitled for Unaccompanied Cello 1989
- La Vivandiere 1994
