= Elsa Werth =

French artist

- Born: 12 December 1985 (age 40); Paris, France
- Education: École Nationale Supérieure des Arts Décoratifs, École nationale supérieure des Beaux-Arts
- Known for: Visual art
- Awards: Pernod Ricard Foundation Prize
- Website: elsawerth.net

Elsa Werth (born 1985) is a French artist who lives and works in Paris.

== Biography ==
Elsa Werth was born in 1985 in Paris, France. She graduated from both the École Nationale Supérieure des Arts Décoratifs where she studied film animation and École nationale supérieure des Beaux-Arts. She was awarded the price Humankind Leo Burnet in 2013 and the 23rd Pernod Ricard Foundation Prize for contemporary art in 2022.

== Work ==
Elsa Werth's practice includes installation, sculpture, video, artist's books, and sound pieces. She has exhibited since 2013 in France, U.S., China, Belgium, Germany, Luxembourg, and Switzerland.

Her work focuses on the use of common objects and gestures, systems, language, traditional and contemporary rituals. The interpretation of information and commodity production, as well as their relations to the social circles, are the key approaches to her projects. She uses alternative modes of exchange and expression to contradict a world she considers subject to the cult of material values. Her works are always made with simple means to escape spectacular effects.

In 2014 she curated with Muriel Leray inside a storage unit in Paris Plus une pièce. Since 2016 she curates Potential Visual Evocations, an ongoing outdoor traveling exhibition that took place in Paris, Clichy, Shanghai, Montreal, La Louvière and Seoul. Participating artists include Claude Closky, Seulgi Lee and Marylène Negro among others.

== Collections ==
Her work is included in the permanent collections of the Centre Pompidou, Kadist Art Foundation, Les Abattoirs, Fonds régional d'art contemporain de Normandie-Caen, the Frac des Pays de la Loires, the Frac Franche-Comté, the Centre national des arts plastiques, the Rennes 2 University Cabinet du livre d'artistes.

== Selected exhibitions ==
=== Solo exhibitions ===
- Central Idea, Friends & Family, Bordeaux, 2026
- AM: A Beginning / PM: What Remains, Été 78, Brussels, 2025
- 24/7, B09K, Changsha, China, 2023
- Titre un à usages multiples, Lendroit, Rennes, 2022
- Give and Take, Bloom, Düsseldorf, 2022
- Parties de cartes, CDLA, Saint-Yriex-la-Perche, 2021
- Blow: Elsa Werth, Bloom, Düsseldorf, 2020
- A Land, mfc – Michèle Didier, Paris, 2020
- Anywayland, Interface, Dijon, 2019
- Temps Partiel [Part-Time], Onde Art Center, Vélizy-Villacoublay, 2019
- L'action cesse, Duplex Walden, Geneva, 2018
- Temporary Perspectives, Martine Aboucaya Gallery, Paris
- Title One for Multiple Use, Bazaar Compatible Program, Shanghai, 2016
- Title One for Multiple Use, Martine Aboucaya Gallery, Paris, 2016
- Elsa Werth, Primo Piano, Paris, 2014

=== Group exhibitions ===
- Contemporary art collection, Centre Pompidou, Paris, 2023
- Janelas, BPS22, Charleroi, 2023
- The Seashore of Endless Worlds, Le Commun, Geneva, 2023
- P,Oe?ie!, TOPO?, Brussels, 2023
- De toi à moi, Fondation FIMINCO, Romainville, France, 2022
- Horizones, Fondation d'entreprise Pernod Ricard, curated by Clément Dirié, 2022
- 3 Collectionneurs #8, Été 78, Brussels, 2021
- Helix, Bloom, Düsseldorf, curated by Ji Sue Byun, 2021
- Nous irons tous au paradis, Frac Normandie – Caen, curated by Anne Cartel, 2021
- Tout un film!, Drawing Lab, Paris, curated by Joana P.R. Neves, 2021
- X, Frac Pays de la Loire, Carquefou, curated by Claude Closky, 2020
- Some of Us, NordArt – Kunst in der Carlshütte, Büdelsdorf, curated by Jérôme Cotinet-Alphaize and Marianne Derrien, 2019
- Pourquoi faire, pour quoi faire, Été 78, Brussels, curated by Renato Casciani, 2019
- Calculated Chance, The Société, Brussels, curated by Manuel Abendroth et Els Vermang, 2019
- ShipShape, Biennale de Coimbra, curated by Tomas Cunha Ferreira, 2019
- Tilt Horizon 偏见, AMNUA, Nanjing, curated by Wang Yamin, 2019
- 26 x Bauhaus, Institut Français, Berlin, 2019, curated by Marjolaine Lévy and Thibaut de Ruyter, 2019
- One Minute One Hour One Month... One Million Years, The Island Club Limassol, curated by Christodoulos Panayiotou, 2019
- Le génie du lieu, Le Creux de l’Enfer, Thiers, curated by Sophie Auger-Grappin, 2018
- Potential Visual Evocations, Darling Foundry, Montreal, 2018
- Phantoms, Wonder/Liebert, Bagnolet, curated by Karin Schlageter, 2018
- Artist-fun space, Art Center André Malraux, Douarnenez, curated by Julien Nédélec, 2018
- Flatland / Abstractions Narratives, Mudam, Luxembourg, 2017
- Sentimental Summer, Centre d’Art Bastille (CAB), Grenoble, 2017
- La vie mode d’emploi, CAC Chanot, Clamart, curated by Madeleine Mathé and Karin Schlageter, 2017
- Do Disturb, Palais de Tokyo, Paris, 2017
- Rob is a Robe, Doc, Paris, 2016
- 60ème Salon de Montrouge, Montrouge, 2015
- Bazar, Primo Piano, Paris, curated by Lucia Schreyer, 2015
- Cocktail Games, La Ludothèque éphémère, Paris, curated by Florencia Chernajovsky and Clément Dirié, 2015
- Châteaux de cartes, Florence Loewy...by artists, Paris, curated by Camille Azaïs, 2015
- Intertidal, Galerie Eva Meyer, Paris, curated by MBDTCurators, 2015
- Modifications, Zentrum für Kunst und Urbanistik (ZK/U), Berlin, 2014
- Toujours +, Florence Loewy...by artists, Paris, 2014
- 5/5, Fondation Rosenblum, Paris, curated by Clément Dirié, 2013
- Marler Media Art Award, Museum of Sculpture Glaskasten, Marl, curated by Georg Elben, 2013

== Selected books ==
- Plus une pièce, Plus un multiple, 2014, ISBN 978-2-9550024-0-7
- Sparkless, 2015, ISBN 979-10-94645-00-0
- Original soldé, 2018, ISBN 979-10-94645-01-7
- Formule de politesse, 2019, ISBN 9791094645024
- 2020, 2020, ISBN 979-10-94645-03-1
- Politeness, 2020, ISBN 979-10-94645-05-5
- Un jour dans Le Monde (4 octobre 2019), 2020, ISBN 978-2-917393-11-6
- Negociation, 2021, ISBN 979-10-94645-08-6
- Meeting Point, 2022, ISBN 979-10-94645-08-6
- Abracadabra, 2022, ISBN 978-2-9602786-1-3
- Global Warming Coloring Book, 2023 ISBN 979-10-94645-11-6
