= Tatiana Trouvé =

Italian artist (born 1968)

- Born: 4 August 1968 (age 57); Cosenza, Italy
- Education: Villa Arson, Nice (1989); Ateliers '63, Haarlem (1992)

Tatiana Trouvé (born 4 August 1968) is a French-Italian visual artist based in Paris. She works on large-scale installations, sculptures, and drawings. She states that her artwork is "the uncertain boundary between fiction and reality, the mental and the physical, as well as time, space, and memory." In 2020, Trouvé was awarded France's Officier de l’Ordre des Arts et des Lettres for her contribution to French culture.

== Early life and education ==
Tatiana Trouvé, born in 1968 in Cosenza, Italy, is a Franco-Italian visual artist. From ages 8 to 15 she lived in Dakar, Senegal, where her father taught architecture.

After studying at the Villa Arson in Nice, France, where she graduated in 1989, she spent two years in residence at De Ateliers (formerly Ateliers '63) in the Netherlands, where she studied under Stanley Brouwn, before eventually settling in Paris in 1995. In Paris, she worked briefly as a guard at the Centre Pompidou.

During her education, she learned about the works of Alighiero Boetti, Eva Hesse, Edward Kienholz, Lousie Bourgeois, Bruce Nauman, Ed Ruscha, Marcel Duchamp, and Agnes Martin, and was drawn to their invention of forms, concepts, and ideas that "depart[ed] from concrete experience". She also finds influence in writers, often incorporating their language into her artworks. Some examples include Fernando Pessoa, Jorge Luis Borges, and Italo Calvino.

== Career ==
Trouvé's work in drawing, sculpture, and installation explores the dimensions of space and time, blurring boundaries between interior and exterior worlds, nature and architecture, inert matter and living forms. In 1997, she began developing the Bureau d’Activités Implicites (B.A.I.), a fictional archive and self-representation project based on invented documents. It introduced many of the enduring themes in her practice, including fragmented narratives, the construction of psychological and physical space, and invented identity.

Her sculptural works often unfold in suspended or transitional environments. Cast or fabricated objects—such as chairs, bags, ropes, or architectural fragments—inhabit scenes marked by emptiness, stillness, or waiting. The use of materials such as bronze, copper, glass, or stone enhances the tension between solidity and erasure, creating an atmosphere of quiet disorientation.

She has developed sculptural series such as Polders (2000 – ongoing), which depict miniature or inaccessible interior spaces. In the series The Guardian (2013 – ongoing), personal effects are juxtaposed with empty sculpted chairs, evoking the ghostly presence of benevolent, protective figures.

Drawing also holds a central place in Trouvé's practice. Her large-scale graphite works, composed through layers of imagery, visual memory, and elements drawn from her studio, form complex mental landscapes. Series such as Intranquillité (2005 – ongoing), Remanence (2008 – ongoing), and Les dessouvenus (2013 – ongoing) investigate memory, mental images, and threshold states between waking and dreaming. Rather than documenting facts, these drawings explore how we inhabit time, thought, and the imaginary.

Tatiana Trouvé's work has been exhibited widely at an international level, including in biennials, triennials, and both solo and group exhibitions. In 2007, she received the Marcel Duchamp Prize, one of the most prestigious awards in the field of contemporary art in France.

Recent publications include The Strange Life of Things (Marsilio Arte, 2025), a monograph accompanying her exhibition at the Pinault Collection – Palazzo Grassi; a special publication of Les Cahiers du Mnam dedicated to Trouvé's work, Les Cahiers du Musée national d’art moderne n°171 (Éditions du Centre Pompidou, 2025); Récits, rêves et autres histoires (Éditions de l’École nationale supérieure des beaux-arts, 2023); and Le grand atlas de la désorientation (Centre Pompidou, 2022), a comprehensive catalogue of her drawings published in conjunction with her exhibition at the Centre Pompidou.

Her works are held in numerous public and private collections, including the Centre Pompidou, Musée d’Art Moderne de Paris, MAC VAL, Migros Museum (Zurich), Museo del Novecento (Milan), Hirshhorn Museum (Washington, D.C.), Nasher Sculpture Center (Dallas), Solomon R. Guggenheim Museum (New York), and Museo Jumex (Mexico City).

== Notable series ==
=== Sculpture series ===
==== (1997–2007) Bureau d'activités implicites ====
The Bureau d'activités implicites (Bureau of Implicit Activities) was produced over the course of ten years from 1997 to 2007. The project began when Trouvé reflected on her legitimacy as an artist despite her lack of resources, visibility, and a growing collection of employment rejection letters. Compiling CVs, job application materials, identification papers, preparatory drawings, written texts, office supplies, and more, Trouvé began the production of the Bureau d'activités implicites which developed into 13 'modules', archiving the development of her career as an artist. Through the creation of these architectural modules, Trouvé constructed an administrative space to house her creative efforts as well as her clerical attempts to adhere to the red tape of the art world.

Notable modules include the Reminiscence Module (1999), Secrets & Lies (2003), the Archive Modules, and the Administrative Module (1997–2002). The administrative module is the most significant of this work, as it regroups all the documents that attest to her life in social and administrative terms (CV, grant applications, cover letters, job applications...).

==== (2000–Ongoing) Polders ====
Since 2000, Trouvé has been constructing maquettes, or doll houses, which emerge from the universe of "implicit activities" that comprise her series Polders. The series title refers to the Dutch term for land reclaimed by water. These large-scale maquettes take the form of deserted workplaces, recording studios, or unoccupied desks, often viewable from windows or mirrors preventing physical accessibility to the space. They represent that which has always been there, waiting to be recuperated or reorganized. Placed on the ground or fixed to the wall, these items adapt themselves to the physical exhibition space, and at the same time, they suggest the existence of a different space or environment. These Polders look to occupy the space to parasite it. "It is with the goal of reconstructing the spaces in which I had been or in which something happened: reconstructions of space, of memory, in the form of maquettes" — Tatiana Trouvé.

=== Drawing series ===
==== (2005–Ongoing) Intranquillity ====
The Intranquillity series includes approximately forty works. Using source images from her archive of architectural and design magazines and her photographs, Trouvé creates liminal environments reminiscent of a proposed architecture but denying its concrete structure. Composed of industrial and domestic objects and lacking a true interior or exterior, the drawings are meant to exist within the fringe of reality and time, leaving the viewer to oscillate between grounded renderings and disorienting picture planes.

The title of this series comes from the invented word by Fernando Pessoa. As Trouvé defines it, the word means, "not being tranquil but not being annoyed either".

==== (2020) From March to May ====
From March to May was created during the first COVID-19 lockdown in March and April 2020. The series features 56 drawings atop the front pages of newspapers from all around the world with texts that recount the globalized anxiety of the pandemic. Trouvé adorns these surfaces with drawings informed by the layout of the page. The common imagery found within Trouvé's drawings invites contemplation and mediates the unease found within the text underneath. The work is presented as a set of 56 drawings and was displayed at the Gagosian Gallery in 2021 and the Centre Pompidou in 2022.

== Recognition ==
- (2025) Chevalier de l’Ordre national du Mérite
- (2024) Kistefos Sculptor of the Year
- (2020) Officier de l’Ordre des Arts et des Lettres
- (2019) Rosa Schapire Kunstpreis
- (2014) ACACIA Prize
- (2007) Prix Marcel Duchamp
- (2005) ISCP Residency
- (2001) Foundation Pernod Ricard Prize
- (1990) Atelier '63, Haarlem, Netherlands

== Collections (selected) ==
=== Public collections ===
- By Art Matters, Hangzhou, China.
- Collection CAPC Musée d’art contemporain de Bordeaux, France.
- FAMM: Femmes Artistes du Musée de Mougins, France.
- FNAC Fonds national d'art contemporain (CNAP), Paris, France.
- Fond Cantonal d'Art contemporain de Geneva, Switzerland.
- Fonds Départemental d'Art Contemporain du Val de Marne (MAC VAL), Vitry-sur-Seine, France.
- Frac Ile-de-France, Paris, France. Frac Aquitaine, Bordeaux, France.
- Frac Limousin, Limoges, France. Frac Provence-Alpes-Côtes d'Azur, Marseille, France.
- Frac Poitou-Charentes, Angoulême, France.
- He Art Museum, Shunde, China.
- Hirshhorn Museum and Sculpture Garden, Washington D.C.
- Kistefos, Jevnaker, Norway.
- MAMCO, Geneva, Switzerland.
- MAXXI Museo nazionale delle arti del XXI Secolo, Rome, Italy.
- Migros Museum, Zürich, Switzerland.
- Musée National d’Art Moderne, Centre Georges Pompidou, Paris, France.
- Musée d'Art Moderne de la Ville de Paris, Paris, France.
- Musée Régional d'Art Contemporain, Languedoc-Roussillon, Sérignan, France.
- MUSEION Museum of modern and contemporary art, Bolzano, Italy.
- Museo del Novecento, Milan, Italy.
- Museo Jumex, Mexico City, Mexico.
- Nasher Sculpture Center, Dallas, TX.
- Red Brick Museum, Beijing, China.
- Solomon R. Guggenheim Museum, New York.
- Wroclaw Contemporary Museum, Wroclaw, Poland.

=== Private foundations ===
- CIAC Colección Isabel y Agustín Coppel, Mexico City, Mexico.
- Collection Pinault – Bourse de Commerce, Paris, France.
- Fondation d'entreprise Louis Vuitton, Paris, France.
- FWA Foundation For Women Artists, Antwerp, Belgium.
- Lafayette Anticipations – Fondation d'entreprise Galeries Lafayette, Paris, France.

== Exhibitions (selected) ==
- 1997: Tatiana Trouvé, Centre national d’art contemporain de la Villa Arson, Nice, France.
- 2002: Polders, curated by Nicolas Bourriaud and Jérome Sans, Palais de Tokyo, Paris, France.
- 2003: Aujourd'hui, hier, ou il y a longtemps, curated by François Poisay, CAPC musée d'art contemporain de Bordeaux, France.
- 2003: Clandestini / Clandestines, curated by Francesco Bonami, 50th Venice Biennale, Venice, Italy.
- 2004: Juste assez coupable pour être heureuse, curated by Christian Bernard, MAMCO, Geneva, Switzerland.
- 2005: Djinns, curated by Sylvie Boulanger, Cneai, Chatou, France.
- 2006: Printemps de septembre, curated by Jean-Marc Bustamante and Pascal Pic, Les Abattoirs, Toulouse, France.
- 2006: La Force de l'Art, Grand Palais, Paris, France (Ricard Prize).
- 2007: Times Snares, Galerie Emmanuel Perrotin, Miami, United States.
- 2007: Think with the Senses – Feel with the mind, 52nd Biennale de Venice, Arsenale, Venice, Italy.
- 2007: Double Bind, curated by Marc-Olivier Wahler, Palais de Tokyo, Paris, France.
- 2007: Tatiana Trouvé, curated by Eric Magion, Centre national d'Art contemporain de la Villa Arson, Nice, France.
- 2008: Density of Time, König Galerie, Berlin, Germany.
- 2008: 4 between 3 and 2, curated by Jean-Pierre Boraz, Centre Georges Pompidou, Paris, France (Marcel Duchamp Prize 2007).
- 2009: A Stay between Enclosure and Space, Migros Museum, Zurich, Switzerland.
- 2010: Il Grande Ritratto, Kunsthaus Graz, Austria.
- 2010: Tatiana Trouvé, South London Gallery, London, England.
- 2010: Tatiana Trouvé, Gagosian, New York City, NY, United States.
- 2011: Éloge du doute, Punta della Dogana, François Pinault Foundation, Venice, Italy.
- 2013: I cento titoli in 36 524 giorni (The hundred titles in 36,524 days), Gagosian, Rome, Italy.
- 2014: L'Écho le plus long (The Longest Echo), MAMCO, Geneva, Switzerland.
- 2015: Biennale d'art contemporain de Lyon, Lyon, France.
- 2015: Studies for Desire Lines, Gagosian, Park and 75, New York, NY, United States.
- 2015: Desire Lines, Public Art Fund commission. Doris C. Freedman Plaza, Central Park, New York, United States.
- 2016: From Alexandrinenstrasse to the Unnamed Path, König Galerie, Berlin, Germany.
- 2016: L'Éclat de L'Absence, Red Brick Museum, Beijing, China.
- 2017: BIENALSUR, Bienal Internacional de Arte Contemporáneo de América del Sur, Buenos Aires, Argentina.
- 2017: Yokohama Triennale, Yokohama, Japan.
- 2017: A Good Neighbor, Istanbul Biennial, Istanbul, Turkey.
- 2017: Avalanche, Elevation 1049, Gstaad, Switzerland.
- 2018: The Great Atlas of Disorientation, Petach Tikva Museum of Art, Petach Tikva, Israel.
- 2018: Le Numerose Irregolaritá, Villa Medici, Rome, Italy.
- 2018: Tatiana Trouvé, Gagosian, Rome, Italy.
- 2019: On the Eve of Never Leaving, Gagosian, Beverly Hills, CA, United States.
- 2021: The Residents, Afterness, Artangel, Orford Ness, Suffolk, UK.
- 2021: From March to May, Gagosian, New York, NY, United States.
- 2022: The Great Atlas of Disorientation (Le grand atlas de la désorientation), Centre Pompidou, Paris, France.
- 2025: The Strange Life of Things, Palazzo Grassi - Pinault Collection, Venice, Italy.

== Bibliography ==
- Bourgeois, Caroline, James Lingwood, Tatiana Trouvé, Bruno Racine, Neville Wakefield and Barbara Casavecchia. Tatiana Trouvé: The Strange Life of Things. Venice: Marsilio arte, 2025. ISBN 9791254632680
- Trouvé, Tatiana. Tatiana Trouvé: Récits, rêves et autres histoires. Paris: ENSBA, 2023. ISBN 9782840568520
- Criqui, Jean-Pierre and Hoptman, Laura, Tatiana Trouvé. The Great Atlas of Disorientation, Paris: Centre Pompidou, 2022. ISBN 9782844269256
- Trouvé, Tatiana. From March to May. New York: Gagosian Gallery, 2021. ISBN 9781951449223
- Maor, Hadas. Tatiana Trouvé: The Great Atlas of Disorientation. Tel Aviv: Petach Tikva Museum of Art, 2018. ISBN 9789657461341
- Trouvé, Tatiana, Katharina Grosse, Chiara Parisi and Cecilia Trombadori. Tatiana Trouvé/Katharina Grosse: le numerose irregolarità. Milan: Electa, 2018. ISBN 9788891818799
- Berg, Stephan, Letizia Ragalia, Ellen Seifermann, Barbara Hess, Richard Shusterman, Francesca Pietropaolo, Robert Storr and Stefan Gronert. Tatiana Trouve: I tempi doppi. Köln: Snoeck, 2014. ISBN 9783864420801
- Gough, Maria, Tatiana Trouvé and Heike Munder. Tatiana Trouvé. Köln: Walther König, 2011. ISBN 9783865608581
- Pakesch, Peter, Adam Budak, Dino Buzzati, Dieter Roelstraete, Pamela M. Lee, Francesca Pietropaolo and Maria Gough. Tatiana Trouvé, Il Grande Ritratto. Köln: Walther König, 2010. ISBN 9783865607539
- Storr, Robert, Catherine Millet and Richard Shusterman. Tatiana Trouvé. Köln: Verlag Der Buchhandlung Walther König, 2008. ISBN 9783865603524
- During, Élie and Jean-Pierre Bordaz. Tatiana Trouvé: 4 between 3 and 2. Paris: Centre Pompidou, 2008. ISBN 9782844263650
- Lamy, Frank. Lapsus. Vitry-sur-Seine, France: Mac/Val, 2007. ISBN 9782916324326
- Trouvé, Tatiana and Hans Ulrich Obrist. Djinns. Chatou, France: CNEAI, 2005. ISBN 9782912483379
- During, Élie, François Poisay and Maurice Fréchuret. Tatiana Trouvé: Aujourd'hui, hier, ou il y a longtemps. Bordeaux, France : CAPC Musée d'art contemporain, 2003. ISBN 9782877211970
- Maraniello, Gianfranco. Tatiana Trouvé: Polders. Paris: Palais de Tokyo, 2002. ISBN 9782847110081
- Boyer, Charles-Arthur and Joseph Mouton. Tatiana Trouvé. Nice, France: Villa Arson, 1997. ISBN 9782905075932
