= Mircea Cantor =

Romanian-born artist

- Born: 1977 (age 48–49); Romania
- Known for: Video, Animation, Sculpture, Photography, Drawing, Painting, Conceptual Art
- Awards: Marcel Duchamp Prize, 2011; Ricard Prize, 2004

Mircea Cantor (born 1977) is a Romanian-born artist who follows in the tradition of French artist Marcel Duchamp in that he employs readymade objects. Cantor's choice of media is diverse, in that he has employed video, animation, sculpture, drawing, painting, and Installation art in his work.

In 2004 he benefited from an artist residency at Cité internationale des artsin Paris, before winning the Marcel-Duchamp Prize.

Cantor's 2005 video work, "Deeparture", which was on view in the contemporary galleries at The Museum of Modern Art, features a deer and a wolf together in a pristine white box environment. Cantor's work is included in The Museum of Modern Art, the Walker Art Center, The Philadelphia Museum of Art, Centre Pompidou, The Israel Museum, Museo Nacional Centro de Arte Reina Sofía, Abteiberg Museum, Magasin 3, as well as in other collections worldwide. He was awarded with the Ricard Prize in 2004; in 2011, he won Best Dance Short Film at the Tiburon International Film Festival with Tracking Happiness. In 2011, he received the Marcel Duchamp Prize. He was named an Officier in Ordre des Arts et des Lettres in 2019.

== Selected solo exhibitions ==
- Mircea Cantor: Înainte, Musée d'arts de Nantes, Nantes, 2019
- Mircea Cantor: Vânatorul de Imagini (Chasseur d'images), Musee de la Chasse et de la Nature, Paris, 2019
- Mircea Cantor: Adjective to your presence, Maison Hermès, Tokyo, 2018
- Mircea Cantor: RESTLESS: Films and Other Works, Museum of the Moving Image (New York City), 2012
- Mircea Cantor: Heilige Blumen (Holy Flowers), Kunsthalle Nürnberg, 2010
- Mircea Cantor: Tracking Happiness, Kunsthaus Zurich, 2009
- Mircea Cantor: The Title Is the Last Thing, Philadelphia Museum of Art, 2006
