= Tuna Fishing (painting) =

Painting by Salvador Dalí

- Artist: Salvador Dalí
- Year: 1966–67
- Medium: Oil on canvas
- Dimensions: 302 cm × 404 cm (119.65 in × 159.06 in)
- Location: Fondation Pernod Ricard; Paris

Tuna Fishing (Homage to Meissonier) is an oil on canvas painting by Spanish artist Salvador Dalí, from 1966–1967. It has been considered as one of Dalí's last masterpieces.

== Description ==
Tuna Fishing is a large canvas (roughly four metres by three metres). It depicts the Almadraba, a traditional form of tuna fishing which involves herding schools of tuna into smaller and smaller nets, before hauling them ashore with grappling hooks and slaughtering them (the word almadraba means "slaughter") The scene is filled chaotically with the violent struggle of the men in the picture and the big fish: In the centre a golden knife is stabbed into the fish and the azure-blue sea becomes red with blood.

The painting is a dedication to Jean-Louis-Ernest Meissonier, a 19th-century French painter who specialised in battle scenes. Dalí once stated "Tuna Fishing is the most ambitious picture I have painted because it bears the subtitle Homage to Meissonier."

== Background ==
Robert Descharnes wrote that Dalí applied all of his "pictorial tendencies" to the painting including elements of surrealism, pointillism, action painting, tachism, pop art, op art, classicism, "quintessential pompierism" [19th century academic painting], and even elements of the psychedelic sub-culture that was just coming into vogue at that time. In later years, Dalí often divided his time between Paris and New York, while spending summers in Port Lligat, Spain, where he concentrated on oil paintings. He worked on Tuna Fishing for two consecutive summers there in 1966 and 1967. The French entrepreneur Paul Richard sailed his yacht to Dalí's studio in Port Lligat with the intention of buying a couple of watercolors from the artist however, he wound up purchasing the recently completed monumental oil painting for $280,000 [= > $2,000,000 in 2021]. It was later exhibited at the Hôtel Meurice in Paris in the winter of 1967, as part of his Homage to Meissonier, an exhibition Dalí curated celebrating the work of several late 19th century Salon painters. The painting is currently on display the Fondation Pernod Ricard in Paris.

== Dalí's perspective ==
After the Second World War, Dalí developed an interest in contemporary scientific research that often found expression in his later work. References to nuclear physics, the work of Crick and Watson on deoxyribonucleic acid, Dennis Gabor and holography, Buckminster Fuller and geodesic domes, among many others appeared in his paintings and his writings. In Tuna Fishing, Dalí wanted to include a theory on the limitations of the universe by Pierre Teilhard de Chardin, with stories about tuna fishing his father had told him as a boy, among other ideas for the painting.

"This epic topic was related to me by my father who, although a notary in Figueras in Catalonia, possessed a narrative gift worthy of Homer. He had shown me in his desk, at the same time, an engraving by Swedish 'pompier' artist depicting tuna-fishing, which I also used in working out this oil. But, finally I decided on this subject, which had tempted me all my life, after having read in Teilhard de Chardin that, according to him, the universe and the cosmos were probably limited, which has been confirmed by the latest scientific discoveries. I realized then that is precisely this limitation, contraction, and limit to the cosmos and the universe which makes energy possible. Therefore, the protons, anti-protons, photons, pi-mesons, neutrons, all the elementary particles only possess this formidable hyperaesthetic energy because of these same limits and contractions of the universe. This, in a certain way, relieves us of the terrible anguish stemming from Pascal's theory that human beings were insignificant beside the cosmos, and brings us back to the idea that all the cosmos and all the universe converge in one point, which, in the present case, is the Tuna-Fishing. This accounts for the terrifying energy in this picture! Because all these fish, all those tuna, and the human beings in the act of killing them, personify the limited universe. In other words, since the Dalinian cosmos is limited to the space in the tuna-fishing, all the elements acquire from it the maximum of hyperaesthetic energy." Salvador Dalí

== See also ==
- List of works by Salvador Dalí
