= Cecchetto =

Cecchetto (pronounced [tʃekˈketto]) is an Italian surname derived from the male given name Cecco. Notable people with the surname include:

- Claudio Cecchetto (born 1952), Italian record producer
- Marta Cecchetto (born 1978), Italian model
- Paolo Cecchetto (born 1967), Italian cyclist
- Renato Cecchetto (1951–2022), Italian actor

== See also ==
- Cecchetti
- Cecchettin
