= Alexandra Zaharias =

American ballet teacher (1929–2024)

- Born: Alexandra Zaharias; February 1, 1929; St. Louis, Missouri, U.S.
- Died: December 15, 2024 (aged 95); St. Louis, Missouri, U.S.
- Occupation(s): Ballet teacher, choreographer, artistic director
- Years active: 1949–2022

Alexandra Zaharias (February 1, 1929 – December 15, 2024) was an American ballet teacher.

== History ==
Alexandra Zaharias was born in St. Louis, Missouri, on February 1, 1929. She received her early training in St. Louis from Isabella Rainford, and continued her studies at the School of American Ballet in New York City under the legendary George Balanchine. She attended the National Academy of Ballet, under the direction of Thalia Mara, renowned teacher, author, and later founder of the USA International Ballet Competition, held in Jackson, Mississippi.

Zaharias was National Dance Chairperson for the National Society of Arts and Letters, and past president of the St. Louis Chapter. She served as co-director of the Midwestern Music and Arts Camp, University of Kansas, and taught ballet at Fontbonne University in Clayton, Missouri. She was Dance Consultant for the St. Louis Board of Education Commission and served as dance panelist for the Missouri Arts Council and Regional Arts Commission. She directed four seasons of The Nutcracker, and choreographed KinderKonzerts and Young People's Concerts for the St. Louis Symphony Orchestra.

In 1991, Zaharias received the Hellenic American Achievement Award for her work in the arts. She was honored in 1999 by the Arts & Education Council of Greater St. Louis as a recipient of one of their coveted Excellence in the Arts Awards, in recognition of 50 years of dedicated service to her students and her audiences. In 2009 she was selected as an Ageless-Remarkable St. Louisan Honoree.

Zaharias was Past President of the St. Louis Chapter of the National Society of Arts and Letters, served as a dance panelist for the Missouri Arts Council and the Regional Arts Commission of St. Louis, was Past President of Regional Dance America/Mid-States and served as Historian for its National Board.

Just under two years after retiring, Zaharias died in St. Louis on December 15, 2024, at the age of 95.

== Alexandra School of Ballet ==
Zaharias was the founder and director of the Alexandra School of Ballet, a pre-professional ballet program established in 1949 in Saint Louis, Missouri. She was the director of the Missouri Concert Ballet prior to founding the Alexandra Ballet Company in 1984. That year, Alexandra Ballet received the first Astral Foundation Choreographers Award from the National Association for Regional Ballet.

In 1949, Zaharias first opened the Alexandra School of Ballet at Olive and Boyle in the city of St. Louis, Missouri. Prior to 1949, there were few ballet schools or ballet teachers in St. Louis. Alexandra Zaharias went to New York to study at the School of American Ballet under George Balanchine after seeing legendary ballerina Alexandra Danilova dance Swan Lake at the Kiel Opera House.

As the artistic director of Alexandra Ballet, she oversaw the production of more than 60 different ballets from classical to modern works. From 1949 until 2022, she trained thousands of students in classical ballet and helped dozens of ballet dancers become professional dancers.

Zaharias retired from teaching and closed the school on December 22, 2022.

== Alexandra Ballet students ==
Students of Zaharias have gone on to careers with many of the major ballet companies around the world, including: Alvin Ailey Dance, American Ballet Theatre, Ballet Hispanico, Basel Ballet (Switzerland), Charleston Ballet, Cincinnati Ballet, Dance Theatre of Harlem, Houston Ballet, Joffrey Ballet, Milwaukee Ballet, Verb Ballets, National Ballet of Canada, New York City Ballet, Pacific Northwest Ballet, Pennsylvania Ballet Theatre, Richmond Ballet, Royal Birmingham Ballet (UK), and San Francisco Ballet.
