= Fondation Pernod Ricard =

Foundation and art space

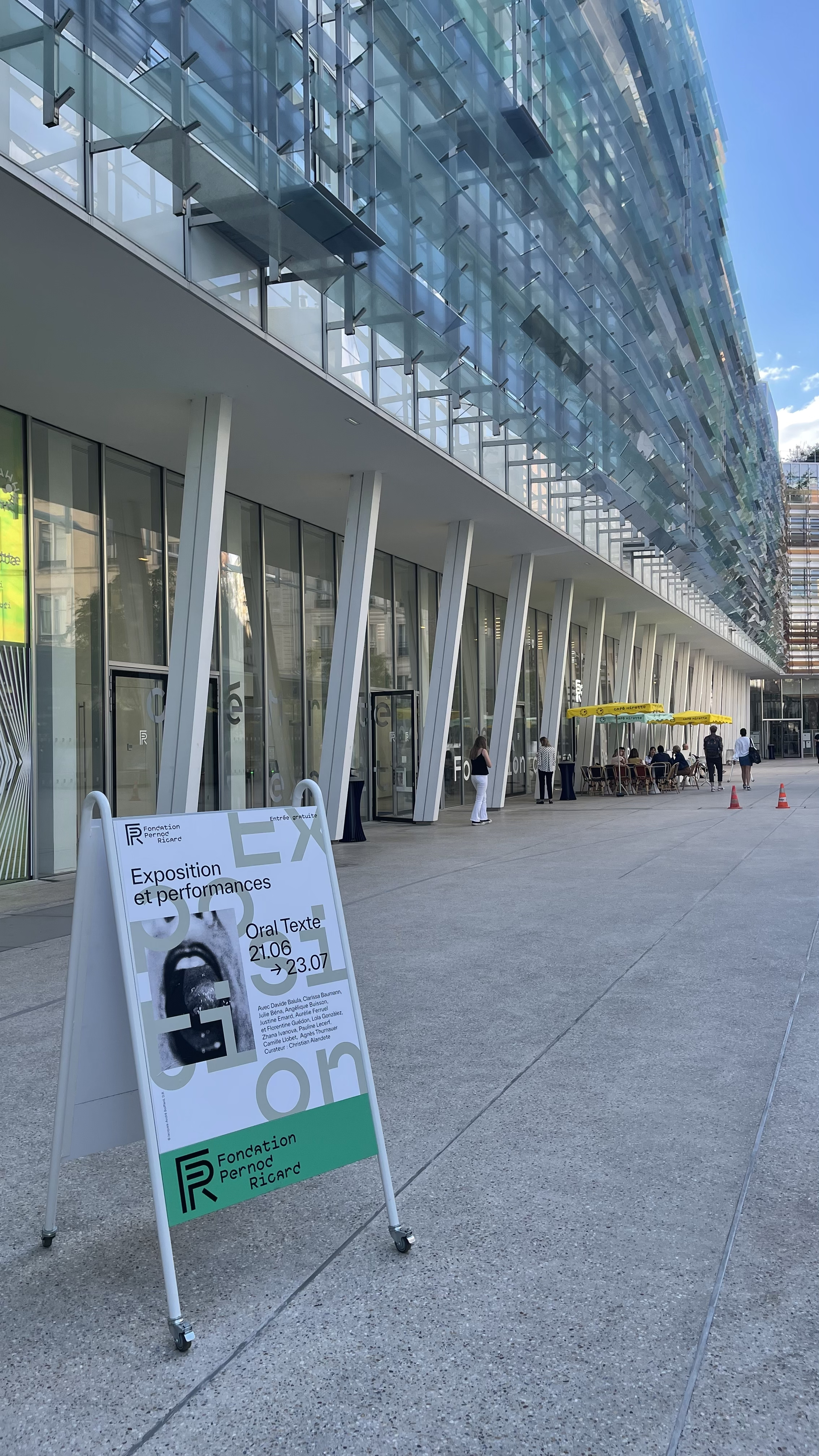
Foundation Pernod Ricard

The Fondation Pernod Ricard, is a foundation and art space open to the public in the 8th arrondissement of Paris, France, focused on young artists and emerging art.

== History ==
The art foundation was established in 1998 in Paris, following the 1997 death of French industrialist and wine and spirits mogul Paul Ricard. It has been organized around the work of emerging artists since its inauguration. The Ricard Prize (or Prix Ricard S.A.) was founded in 1999 and in 2006 its name changed to Prix Fondation d’Entreprise Ricard.

== Cultural activity ==
The Pernod Ricard Foundation Prize recognizes artists under 40. The prize, decided by a jury of artists and curators, includes the purchase of the winner's work by the Centre Pompidou and a year-long partnership with the artists, culminating in a collective exhibition.

== Exhibition Space ==
Located at 1, Cours Paul Ricard 75008 Paris, the foundation's exhibition space hosts a changing program of young artists's work.
