= Benoît Maire =

French visual artist (born 1978)

- Born: October 22, 1978 (age 47); Pessac, France
- Education: Palais de Tokyo, Université Paris 1 Panthéon-Sorbonne, Villa Arson, Nice, Pavillon, and Michel de Montaigne University Bordeaux 3.
- Known for: Film, sculpture, painting, photography, collage, performance
- Movement: Conceptual

Benoît Maire (born 22 October 1978 in Pessac) is a French visual artist who works in film, sculpture, painting, photography, collage, and performance art. He is known for treating theory as an art form in its own right.

== Biography ==
Benoît Maire studied visual art and philosophy at Michel de Montaigne University Bordeaux 3, at the Villa Arson in Nice, and at the Sorbonne where he began doctoral studies in philosophy, which he subsequently abandoned in 2006. He also did graduate work at Le Pavillon, Palais de Tokyo in Paris. He was a resident at the Villa Medici in Rome in 2021-2022.

== Solo exhibitions (selection) ==
- Soon the metal between us will turn into gold, Kunsthalle Mulhouse, 2011
- Spiaggia di Menzogne, Fondazione Giuliani, Rome, 2013
- Weapon, Roberts Institute of Art, London, 2013
- Letre, La verrière Hermès, Brussels, 2014
- Letter, Western Front, Vancouver, 2014
- George Slays the Dragon, Kunstverein Bielefeld, Germany, 2015
- Castling the Queen, Meessen De Clercq, Brussels, 2016
- Thèbes, CapcMusée, Bordeaux, 2018*Thebes, Spike Island, Bristol, UK, 2018.
- Cinque mani Logiche, Fondazione Volume, Roma, 2022
- Miss Rankin, galerie Nathalie Obadia, 2020
- Without, Croy Nielsen, Vienna 2022
- Pierrots, Meessen, Brussels 2024

== Public collections (selection) ==
Maire's work is included in public collections such as:

- Centre Georges Pompidou – Musée National d’Art Moderne, Paris
- FRAC Aquitaine, Bordeaux
- Kadist Art Fondation, Paris
- Nomas Fondation, Rome
- FRAC Île-de-France, Le Plateau, Paris
- David Roberts Art Foundation, London
- New National Museum of Monaco, Monaco
- Vancouver Art Gallery, Vancouver
- Fondazione Giuliani, Rome
- Mudac, Lausanne

== Films (selection) ==
- Le Berger (The Shepherd), 2011
- L'Île de la répétition (Repetition Island), 2010
- Letre, 2015

== See also ==
- Conceptual art
- Aesthetics
