= Missouri Arts Council =

American organization

The Missouri Arts Council is a division of the Office of the Lieutenant Governor. The Council is funded through the Missouri General Assembly, Missouri Cultural Trust, and National Endowment for the Arts.
