= Alex Cecchetti =

Italian artist (born 1977)

Alex Cecchetti (Terni, Italy, 1977) is an Italian artist, poet and choreographer based in Paris and London.

== Works ==
Alex Cecchetti has developed a practice, difficult to classify, that could be called the art of avoidance: tactical and poetic, aesthetic and materialistic, Its system leads to produce specific situations that can exist both inside and outside the traditional exhibitions. His staging of an invisible choreography, exposing the naked body in a public space, hidden even to the artist himself, and whose impossible documentation is the final production of the work, reveals a principle of both disconnect and shift that is the actual core of his work voluntarily heterogeneous in its diverse forms, but united in the method. Collaborative, Alex Cecchetti engages the viewer physically and intellectually, in a concrete experience where his work is perceived as a mental thing and the thought as a form. "

Since 2014 Alex Cecchetti created and curates a program of poetry and science, Voices of Urgency: a series of four events in which poetry enters in dialogues with science to play a fundamental role within our society. Voices of Urgency is hosted by École nationale supérieure des Beaux-Arts and is presented in the official frame of the FIAC, Foire internationale d'art contemporain, Paris.

Poetry and oral transmission are at the core of the performance "Summer Is Not The Prize of Winter" that Alex Cecchetti presented for the first time at The CAC Contemporary Art Centre Vilnius. “Alex Cecchetti’s “relay performance” Summer Is Not the Prize of Winter, is a meditation on the nature of existence and the capacity of language, image, and object to embody life's most essential concerns."

Walking Backwards is a performance first conceived for the Jardin des Plantes in Paris. The artists and some collaborators invited the spectators to walk backward in a secret part of the gardens, while accompanied by a story whispered from their backs. "When you walk backward, you have no knowledge of the images that come, like in dreams or movies, it is not the light that make the difference. We dream with our eyes shut after all, don't we?"

== Exhibitions ==
Alex Cecchetti exhibited internationally in museums, art centers, and galleries. He presented his investigation upon his own death this year at Fiorucci Art Trust, followed by a performance relay at the Serpentine Galleries in London. Alex Cecchetti lately performed as well his complete tour guide of the Louvre without the Louvre at the Centre Georges Pompidou for the 5th edition of "A Nouveau Festival". In 2014, at the Palais de Tokyo in Paris, he presented the artist's first tour guide of Hell and Heaven: "Nuovo Mondo"; in which the audience has been accompanied on a long journey in the underworld. Other Exhibitions: Prix Ricard, Fondation d’entreprise Ricard, Paris (2013); MAXXI National Museum Rome, and CAC Vilnius, Lithuanie (2012); he participated in the show "Danser sa vie" at the Centre Pompidou in Paris, and he has been invited by Raimundas Malasauskas to the Jeu de Paume, Paris (2011); Le Magasin, Grenoble (2010), Museion- Museum of Modern and Contemporary Art of Bolzano (2009)

== Presumed death ==
Since 2015 an artist's bio circulates in which is indicated the year 2014 as the artist's date of death. Nevertheless the artist seems to continue to perform and produce new works.

== Texts and novels ==
"A Society that Breathes Once a Year", Book Works (UK), 2012. ISBN 978 1 906012 32 8
