= Stephen G. Cecchetti =

American economist

- Born: August 18, 1956 (age 69); Berkeley, CA, US
- Education: Ph.D., University of California at Berkeley, 1982; M.A., University of California at Berkeley, 1979; S.B., Massachusetts Institute of Technology (MIT), 1977

Stephen G Cecchetti (born August 18, 1956) is an American economist who has been the Barbara and Richard M Rosenberg Professor of Global Finance at Brandeis International Business School. His principal fields of interest are macroeconomics, monetary economics, financial economics, monetary policy, central banking, and the supply of money.

== Biography ==
Cecchetti was born in Berkeley, California on August 18, 1956. He received a bachelor's degree from MIT in 1977, M.A. from the University of California at Berkeley in 1979, and his Ph.D., also from Berkeley. His dissertation (PhD, 1981) covered inflation. His more recent contributions to academic research have focused on the role of debt and finance in Economic growth, and on improving the resilience of the financial system.

== Professional career ==
From 1982 to 1987, Cecchetti was assistant professor of economics, Graduate School of Business Administration, New York University. He then became assistant professor in the Department of Economics at Ohio State University, rising to associate professor in 1989, and to professor in 1992.

During that period he also held visiting faculty appointments at, Nuffield College, Oxford, Oxford University, Melbourne University, at Boston College, Princeton University, he was a professor at the Department of Economics, Ohio State University from 1992 to 2002.

=== Brandeis ===
From 2003 to 2008, he was the Barbara and Richard M Rosenberg Professor of Global Finance at the Brandeis International Business School.

Cecchetti returned to Brandeis in the winter of 2013 after serving for a time at the Bank for International Settlements (BIS) (see below).

=== Bank for International Settlements ===
In June 2008, he left Brandeis to become economic adviser and head of the Monetary and Economic Department of the Bank for International Settlements (BIS) and a member of the executive committee of the BIS. While at the BIS, he managed the research, statistics and publications produced by the BIS. This has included the preparation of the meetings of central bank governors of the world's largest economies, who gather at the BIS every two months. Various committees of central bankers and financial supervisors are based at the BIS, and as head of the department, it was his responsibility to oversee their activities. Most prominent in this last group is the Basel Committee for Banking Supervision, which sets international standards for bank regulation and supervision.

=== Other activities ===
From August 1997 to September 1999, Cecchetti was executive vice president and director of research at the Federal Reserve Bank of New York. Earlier, he had been for short periods a visiting scholar at the Federal Reserve Bank of Kansas City (Winter-Spring 1986), and a research economist at the National Commission for Employment Policy, Washington, D.C., Summer 1981.

== Publications ==
Cecchetti was editor of the Journal of Money, Credit and Banking from 1992 to 2001.

He is the author of the textbook Money, Banking and Financial Markets, published by McGraw-Hill. It was first published in 2006, with a 2nd edition in 2008. A third edition as published with Kermit Schoenholtz as co-author in 2011. He has written numerous articles on macroeconomics and monetary policy. He has been a regular contributor to the Financial Times and is a founding contributor of VOX, a policy portal.
