= Laurent Grasso =

French artist

- Born: 1972 (age 53–54)

Laurent Grasso (born 1972) is a French conceptual artist living and working in Paris.

== Biography ==
Laurent Grasso is the recipient of the esteemed Order of Arts and Letters by the French Ministry of Culture and the prestigious Marcel Duchamp Prize in 2015, and 2008 respectively. Currently based in Paris, he has held residencies at the Villa Medici, Rome and ISCP, New York.

In 2015, Grasso was solicited by the French National Archives to create a film on the aesthetics of power and its agents. The resulting work ‘Élysée’, set in the French Presidential office's Salon Doré to the soundtrack created by Nicolas Godin, debuted in Edouard Malingue Gallery, Hong Kong in March 2016. Since then it has since been broadcast in Europe on numerous occasions, including the Nuit européenne des musées 2016.

Grasso's work has been exhibited worldwide, notably at the Jeu de Paume, Paris; MASS MoCa, North Adams; Centre Pompidou-Metz, amongst others, and is held in collections such as the Centre Pompidou, Paris; Mori Art Museum, Tokyo and Leeum Samsung Museum, Seoul. It has also been featured in multiple publications including ‘Architecture Now’ (Taschen).

== Work ==
Laurent Grasso's practice engages deeply with science, history, mythology and supernatural phenomena to weave a research-filled narrative. Tending on the epistemological, Grasso works across different disciplines from film and installation to painting and neon. Major public installations include ‘Nomiya’ (2009–2011), a transportable restaurant sat on the roof of the Palais de Tokyo in Paris; ‘Anechoic Pavilion’ (2012), an installation presented by Edouard Malingue Gallery atop Central Ferry Pier 4 in Hong Kong. ‘SolarWind’, a permanent light installation in Paris commissioned by the 13th district council, Ciments Calcia and SEMAPA in collaboration with the Space Observatory and the National Centre for Space Studies’, which projects the colour fluctuations of solar storms onto the walls of two 40 meter Calcia silos bordering the capital's 13 district.

His most notable solo exhibitions in recent years include ‘PARAMUSEUM’ (2016) at Palais Fesch, Ajaccio, ‘Élysée’ (2016) in Edouard Malingue Gallery, Hong Kong and ‘Soleil Noir’ (2015) at the Foundation d’entreprise Hermès, Tokyo.

== Bibliography ==
- Laurent Grasso – Le rayonnement du corps noir , Dijon, Les presses du réel, 2009
- Laurent Grasso – The Black-Body Radiation (English edition), Dijon, Les presses du réel, 2009
- Laurent Grasso – The Horn Perspective, Paris, Centre Pompidou editions, 2009
- Laurent Grasso – Uraniborg, Jeu de Paume, Paris; Musée d’art contemporain de Montréal; Skira Flammarion, 2012
- Laurent Grasso – Future Archeology, Edouard Malingue Gallery, Hong Kong, 2012
