= Loris Gréaud =

French artist (born 1979)

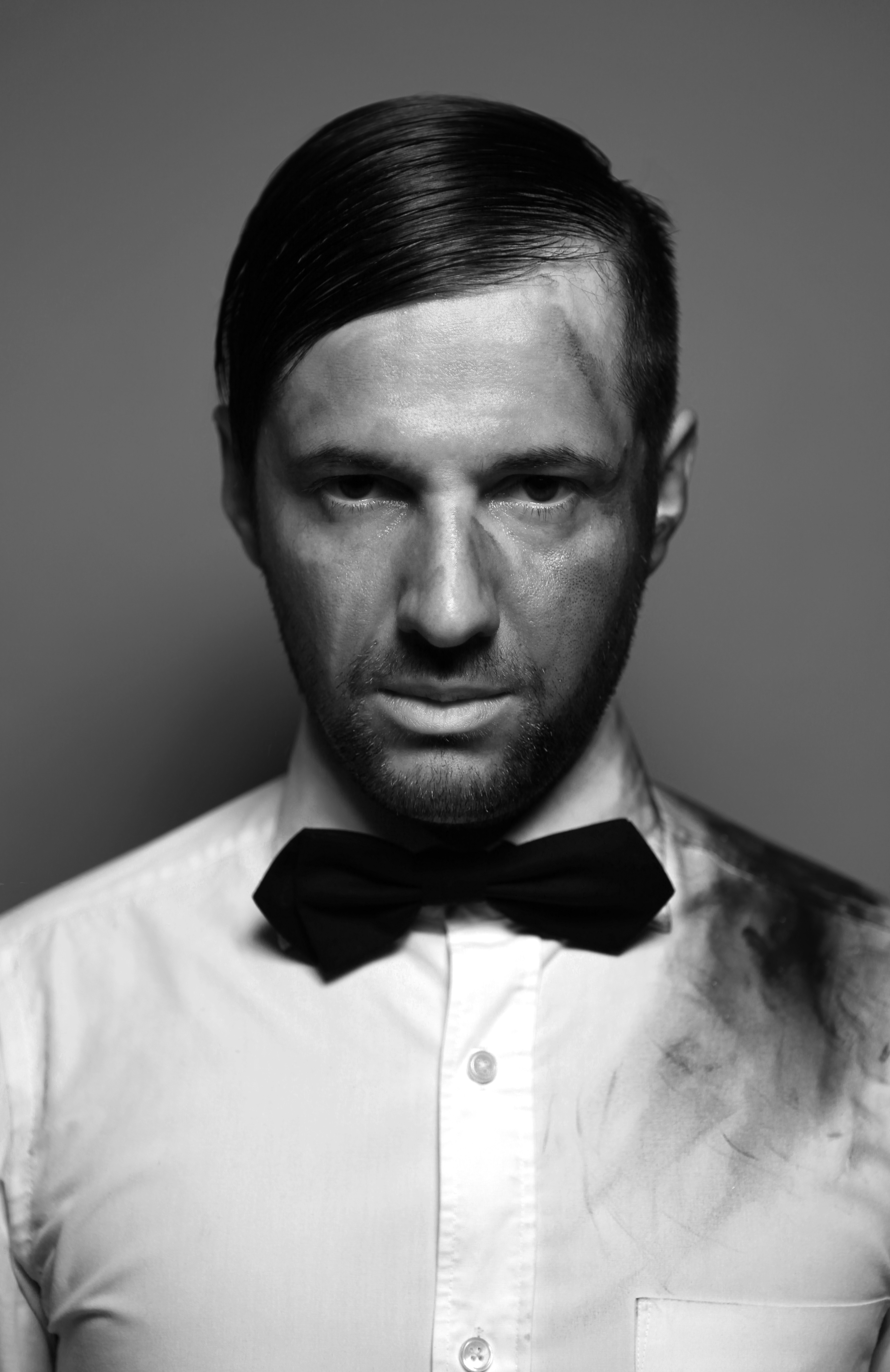
- Born: February 7, 1979 (age 47); Eaubonne, France
- Occupations: Installation artist, filmmaker, architect
- Years active: 2005–present

Loris Gréaud (French: [lɔʁis ɡʁeo]; born February 7, 1979) is a French installation artist, as well as a filmmaker and architect.

== Biography ==
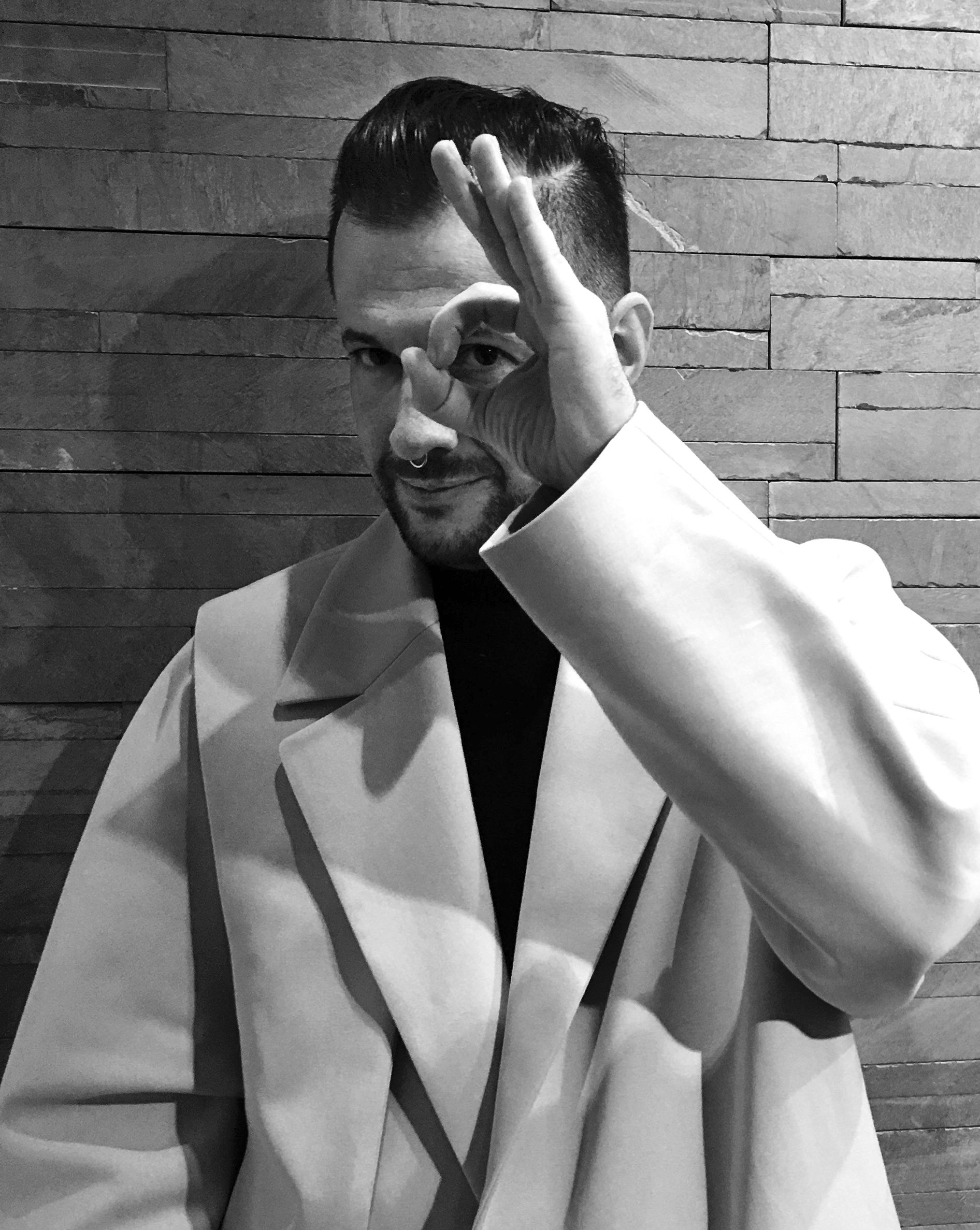
Loris Gréaud

He is seen in the media and recognized by international critics as one of the most important and influential artists of his generation. However, since the beginning of his career, the artist has refused to allow his biography to be published. Most of the biographies available are therefore knowingly incorrect or incomplete.

His work is organized into projects rather than exhibitions.

His first, Silence goes more quickly when played backwards, took place in 2005 at the Plateau/Frac île-de-France (Paris). This was the project that rocketed him onto the international art scene.

In 2008, he became the first artist to be granted full use of the Palais de Tokyo in Paris for his project Cellar Door. He developed and continued this project at the ICA in London, the Kunsthalle Sankt Gallen (Switzerland), the museum La Conservera de Murcia (Spain) and finally at the Vienna Kunsthalle (Austria), ending at Art Basel alongside the publication of a catalogue by JRP Ringier that charted the entire project.

Although international collectors and museums have made some important acquisitions of his work, Greaud chooses to appear only occasionally in galleries and markets. He has had only one double exhibition in the galleries that represent him. The Unplayed Notes was presented at the Pace Gallery in New York City and then at the Yvon Lambert Gallery in Paris in 2012.

In 2013, he was the first artist to be invited to exhibit jointly by the Louvre and the Centre Georges Pompidou in Paris. The double exhibition, Loris Gréaud [I] was free to the public and took place in the museums’ courtyards, purposefully avoiding the usual exhibition spaces of the two institutions.

In 2014, he was appointed as a Knight in the Order of Arts and Letters (Chevalier des Arts et des Lettres).

In 2015, for his project The Unplayed Notes Museum, he became the first artist to take over the entire space of the Dallas Contemporary (USA).

In 2016, he produced the Sculpt project specifically for the LACMA in Los Angeles, his first exhibition on the West Coast of the United States.

In 2017, he attracted the attention of the 57th Venice Biennale with his project The Unplayed Notes Factory in Murano (Italy)

In 2019, the Tel Aviv Museum of Art hosts the monographic project: Sculpt: Grumpy Bear, the Great Spinoff, as a continuation of its first exhibition at LACMA in 2016.

Recently, the exhibition The Original, The Translation shed light on the artist's entire publishing activity at the Bibliothèque Kandinsky I Centre Georges Pompidou after all the works produced by the artist were added to its holdings and documentary collections.

After acquiring the work MACHINE in 2018, the Musée d'Art Moderne de Paris invited Gréaud to design a specific exhibition, as part of the permanent collections, entitled Glorius Read.

In 2020, after several years of development with the Casa Wabi Foundation, Gréaud will inaugurate a perennial project entitled The Underground Sculpture Park. The artist has chosen some twenty works emblematic of his production, which will be buried for eternity in the gardens of Alberto Kalach, which are an extension of the architecture designed by Tadao Ando.

Since 2010, the artist has rarely participated in group shows, preferring to concentrate his resources on developing personal projects. The artist sees "the trajectory of the work through time as a sculpture in its own right."

== Artistic approach ==
Gréaud's method is characterized by prioritizing the project’s idea over the exhibition. He believes that only the idea and the project itself should be its governing principles, defining in particular the conditions of appearance, display, distribution, and even the length of time and cost.

Productivity and efficiency based on the reality of his projects are the focal point of his practice. He also pays special attention to systematically erasing the limits between the spaces of fiction and reality.

One of the common characteristics of Greaud's projects is their scale. By producing work of this magnitude with a global vision, he aims to overwhelm the space and time of the "exhibition".

== Discussions, collaborations ==
Gréaud has on several occasions engaged in "specific discussions ", an essential element in his practice, with professionals from all fields, in an attempt to provide productive answers to his aesthetic questions :

Since 2004, with David Lynch, on the occasion of the conception of his work Eye of the Duck, then in 2012 for his project The Snorks: a concert for creatures.

In 2009, with Lee Ranaldo, for the conception of the work Think Loud, then for his film The Unplayed Notes in 2012.

In 2011-12, with M.I.T. of Boston, and the ANTARES station, as well as with Pr Michel André's LAB for his project The Snorks: a concert for creatures.

On the same occasion, with the hip-hop abstract group Anti-Pop Consortium.

In 2012, with the CNRS for the production of his film The Unplayed Notes.

With NASA and more specifically the Stennis Space Center, for his film Sculpt and the subsequent spinoff Grumpy Bear, in 2016.

Between 2014 and 2016, with Claude Parent, who also appears, notably in his film Sculpt.

In 2016 with the CENIR of the ICM, again for his film Sculpt.

As well as with the Voodoo Priestess Myriam Chamani, The Residents, and once again for the Sculpt project.

He has also been able to call upon film icons for his audiovisual productions: Charlotte Rampling and Willem Dafoe among others.

== Monographs ==
- (en) Loris Gréaud, Galerie Max Hetzler Paris et Berlin, Musée d'Art Moderne de Paris, Holzwarth Publications, 2019 (ISBN 978-3-947127-09-2)
- (en + he) Ruth Direktor, Loris Gréaud, Charlotte Rampling, Sculpt, Grumpy Bear: The Great Spinoff, vol.2, Gréaudstudio Editions, 2019
- (en) Loris Gréaud, Sculpt: A potential Continuity Editing, Vol. 1, Gréaudstudio Editions, 2016
- (fr+en) Loris Gréaud, Jannink Editions, 2015 ISBN 978-2-37229-004-3
- (fr+en), Dis voir, 2015 ISBN 978-2-914563-75-8
- (fr+en) Christophe Ono-Di-Biot, Gréaudstudio Éditions, 2013
- (fr+en) Alain Seban, Marie-Laure Bernadac, Michel Gauthier, Jean-Luc Martinez, Louvre éditions, Centre Pompidou, 2013 ISBN 979-10-90490-32-1
- (fr+en) Loris Gréaud, Gréaudstudio Éditions, 2011
- (fr+en+es) Pascal Rousseau, Gréaudstudio Éditions - JRP Ringier, 2011 ISBN 978-3-03764-167-5
- (fr+pl) Loris Gréaud, Poznan Arts Stations Foundation, 2010 ISBN 978-83-927804-0-3
- (fr+es) Daniel Birnbaum, 2009 ISBN 978-1-933128-67-2
- (fr+en) Raimundas Malasauskas, Aaron Shuster, Loris Gréaud, JRP Ringier, 2008 ISBN 978-3-905829-52-5
- (fr+en), Onestar Press, 2007
- (fr+en), HYX, 2006 ISBN 2-910385-44-2

== Public collections ==
- FRAC Île-de-France (Fonds Régional d'Art Contemporain d'Île-de-France), France.
- Frac Auvergne, (Fond Régional d'Art Contemporain Auvergne), France.
- Fnac, (Fond National d'Art Contemporain), France.
- Fond Municipal de la Ville de Paris, France.
- Centre Georges Pompidou, Paris, France.
- LVMH, Collection Bernard Arnault, Paris, France.
- Collection François Pinault, Venice, Italy.
- Goetz Collection, Munich, Germany.
- Elysee Museum, Lausanne, Switzerland.
- Kadist Foundation, Paris and San Francisco, United States.
- LACMA, Los Angeles, United States.
- Rubell Family Art Collection, Miami, United States.
- Marguiles Collection, Miami, United States.
- Israel Museum, Israel.
- Nam June Paik Art Center, Korea.
