= Simone Cecchetti =

Italian portrait photographer

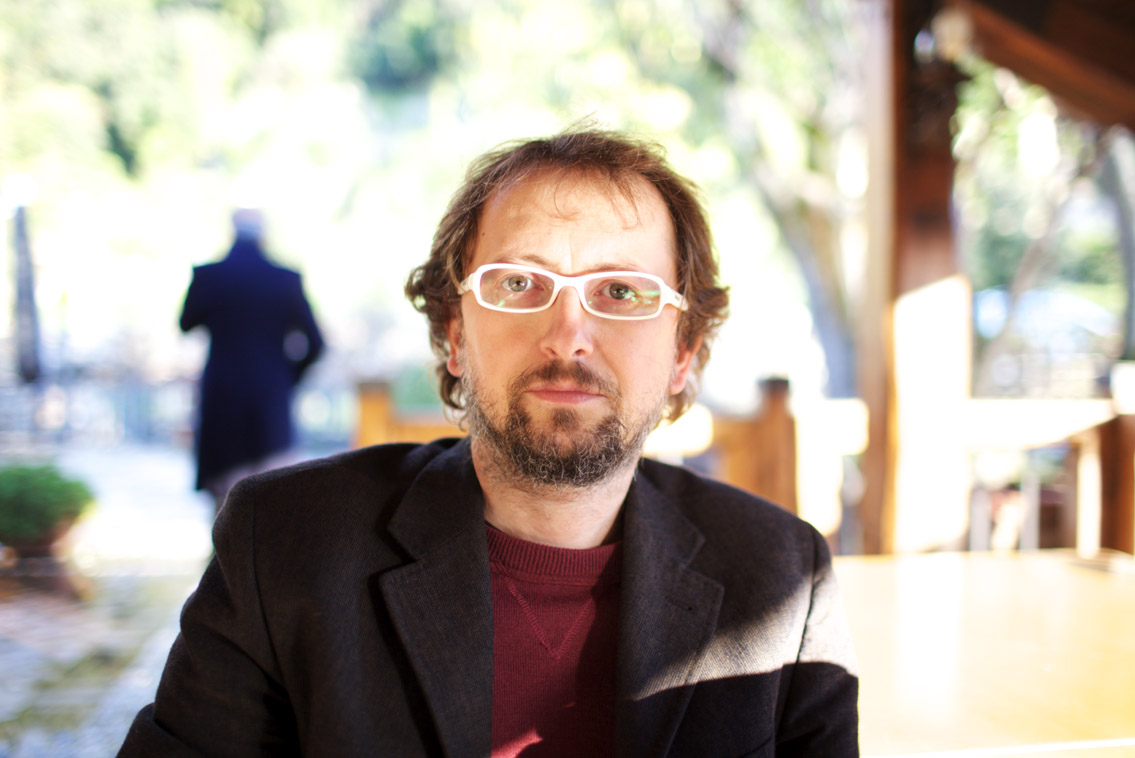
- Born: September 14, 1973 (age 52); Rome, Italy
- Known for: Photography

Simone Cecchetti (born September 14, 1973) is an Italian portrait photographer.

In his career, Cecchetti has been photographing music and entertainment performers in Europe and Japan. His portfolio contains pictures taken in more than 1000 concerts for over 600 artists. His portrait of Mick Jagger has been chosen for the exhibition "Mick Jagger. The photobook", which was presented in the French photography festival Rencontres d'Arles in summer 2010. Among other portraits: Madonna, Nick Cave, Aerosmith, U2, Depeche Mode, George Michael, Lady Gaga, Elvis Costello, Bruce Springsteen.

His pictures have been published on Rolling Stone, GQ, Mojo. He works for Corbis, the American image licensing company founded by Bill Gates.

In 2010 he has been chosen to photograph the mounting and the opening of MAXXI in Rome, the contemporary arts museum designed by Zaha Hadid.

In 2011 his Visions project focused on the artistic content within music shows.

In the same year his picture of ZZ Top was selected to be in the book Music:Box, edited by Gino Castaldo and published by Contrasto. The same book has been translated and published worldwide by six other publishers.

In 2011 Cecchetti started to work with A.S. Roma, with the aim to transfer his rock and roll style in sportsmen portraits. In 2012 his pictures are used for some album covers, Niccolo Fabi (Ecco), Marina Rei (La conseguenza naturale dell'errore), Alessandro Grazian (Armi), Roberto Angelini (Phineas Gage), Andy Timmons (Plays Sgt Pepper), Malika Ayane e Japandroids.

In 2013, the cover for Una Rosa Blanca (Zucchero Fornaciari) and the pictures from Simone Cristicchi (Album di Famiglia), Fiorella Mannoia (A te), Eros Ramazzotti (Noi Due), Francesco Forni and Ilaria Graziano (From Bedlam to Lenane), Vinicio Capossela e la Banda della posta, Tommy Emmanuel (Live and Solo in Pensacola). In 2014 the cover for Alessandro Mannarino (Al Monte), Tommy Emmanuel (The Guitar Mastery of Tommy Emmanuel), Deborah Iurato (Deborah Iurato), Giada Agasucci (Da Capo), Tosca (Il suono della voce), Diodato (A ritrovar bellezza), Fabrizio Bosso e Julian Oliver Mazzariello (Tandem), Fabrizio Bosso e Marco Moreggia (Magic Susi), Ilaria Graziano and Francesco Forni (Come 2 Me). In 2015 the cover of L'amore si muove ("Love Moves") is the fourth studio album by Italian operatic pop trio Il Volo.

From 2016 is a Contour photographer for Getty, the American image licensing company.

In the 2018, the cover for Zerovskij (Renato Zero), Eco di Sirene (Carmen Consoli), Tommy Emmanuel (Accomplice One) and the pictures for Alt in Tour (Renato Zero).

In the 2019 (Teresa De Sio) for the lp Puro desiderio, Rockstar Mai by Young Signorino and Vinicio Capossela Ballate per uomini e bestie, directed and filmed the videoclip Di città in città (e porta l’orso).

In 2022 the release of the bio-doc on Sky Arte “Chi è Simone Cecchetti?” introduced by Renato Zero, Fiorella Mannoia, Paul Gilbert, Tommy Emmanuel, Daniele Silvestri, Diodato, Niccolò Fabi, Nina Zilli, Max Gazzè and more.

In 2023 the Music Photography Academy, the first academy dedicated to the music photography and MONO, a concept magazine.

An exhibition One thousand fabulous faces with one thousand different artists taken live in concert opened at Palazzo Brancaccio for five months.

The photo cover for Saverio Raimondo Live a Studio 33, Bach Transcription Mario Brunello, Accomplice Two (Tommy Emmanuel) and the cover of the first ever pop concert at Teatro Alla Scala starring Paolo Conte, Paolo Conte Alla Scala - Il Maestro È Nell'anima and the documentary.

== Books ==
- Mick Jagger. The Photobook, Exhibition catalogue, Rencontres d'Arles, Contrasto, 2010, ISBN 978-88-6965-273-8.
- Les rencontres d'Arles 2010 - Du lourd et du piquant, Editions Actes Sud, 2010, ISBN 978-2-7427-9152-1.
- Stefano Chiodi e Domitilla Dardi (ed.), SPACE. From MAXXI's collections of art and architecture. Exhibition catalogue, Milano, Mondadori Electa, 2010, ISBN 978-88-370-7587-3.
- Cristiana Parrella, Kutlug Ataman. Mesopotamian dramaturgies, Milano, Mondadori Electa, 2010, ISBN 978-88-370-7578-1
- Gino Castaldo, Music:Box, Contrasto, 2011, ISBN 978-88-6965-301-8
- Christopher Andersen, "Mick Jagger. Gli eccessi, la pazzia, il genio", Sperling & Kupfer, 2012, ISBN 978-88-200-5304-8
- Daniel Ichbiah, "Le dictionnaire Rolling Stones", CITY, 2012, ISBN 978-2-8246-0185-4
- Gilles Lhote, "Rolling Stones, 50 ans après: 50 ans de légende, 50 tubes mythiques", DU ROCHER, 2013, ISBN 978-2-268-07470-2
- Giovanni Rossi, Roger Waters. Oltre il muro, Tsunami, 2013, ISBN 978-88-96131-56-5
- Billy J Altman, "Mick Jagger: A spectacular Rock Life", White Star, 2013, ISBN 978-88-544-0763-3
- Victor Bockris, "Transformer: The Complete Lou Reed Story", Harper, 2014, ISBN 978-0-00-758189-4
- Il Volo, Un'avventura straordinaria. La nostra storia, Rizzoli, ISBN 88-17-08348-8
- Bryan Boyd, "U2. La leggenda", 24 Ore Cultura, 2015, ISBN 978-8866482598
- Iggy Pop, "Til Wrong Feels Right: Lyrics and Photographs", Viking UK, 2019 ISBN 978-0593135976

== Exhibitions ==
- Mick Jagger Photobook, July 3 - September 19, 2010, Arles/ December 3, 2010 - February 13, 2011, Galleria Forma, Milan / February 22 - March 27, 2011 - Auditorium Parco della Musica, Rome / April 9 - May 15, 2011, Multimedia Art Museum, Moscow.
- Visions, February 16–27, 2011, Galleria Ex Roma Club Monti, Rome.
- Mostra personale, September 7–11, 2011, Pomigliano Jazz, Pomigliano d'Arco, Naples.
- Festival, 11 - 19 maggio 2019, Calcata Fotografia, Calcata
- Chi è Simone Cecchetti?, 5–12 March 2022, Micro
- Chi è Simone Cecchetti?, 1–31 July 2022, Palazzo Bonacquisti Assisi
- 1000, One thousand fabulous faces, 21 April 2023 - 5 September 2023, Spazio Field, Palazzo Brancaccio Rome
