= Palais de Tokyo =

Building in Paris

Coordinates: 48°51′51″N 2°17′50″E

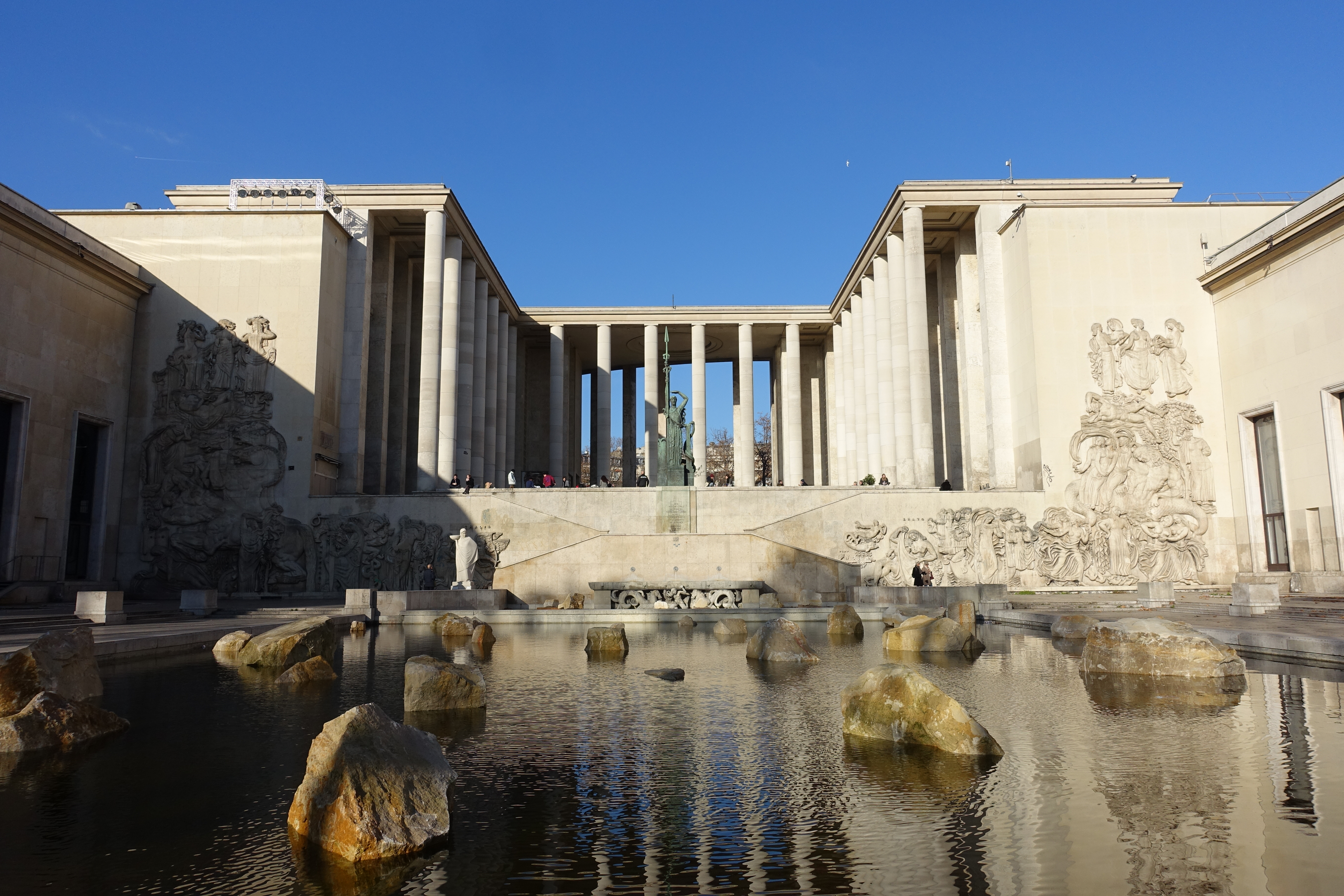
- The Palais de Tokyo
- Interactive map of the Palais de Tokyo area

General information
- Architectural style: Art Deco
- Location: 16th arrondissement, Paris, France, 13 Avenue du Président Wilson
- Current tenants: Musée d'Art Moderne de Paris
- Completed: 1937; 89 years ago
- Owner: City of Paris

Design and construction
- Architects: André Aubert; Marcel Dastugue; Paul Viard

Website
- palaisdetokyo.com

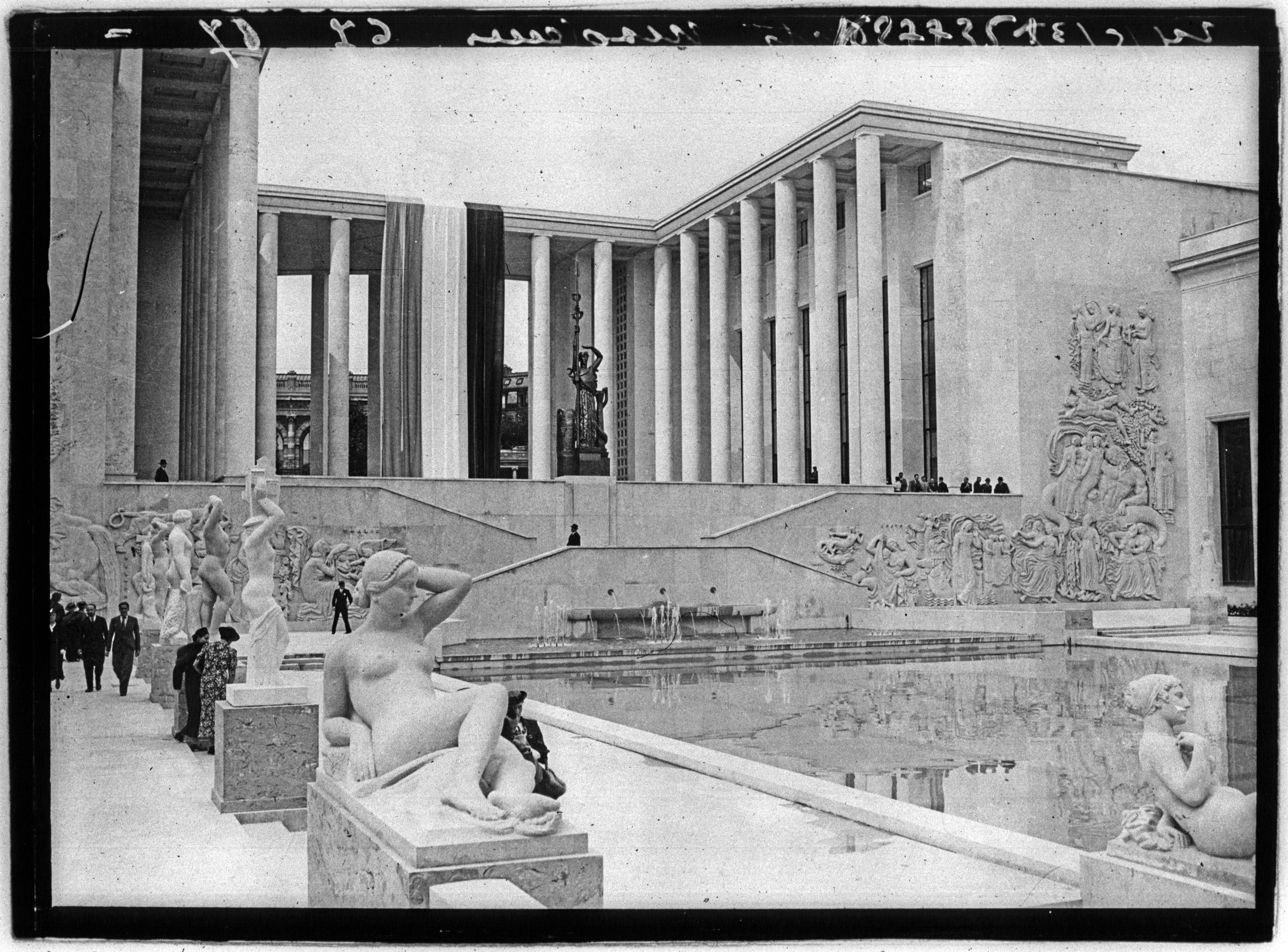
The Palais de Tokyo was opened in 1937.

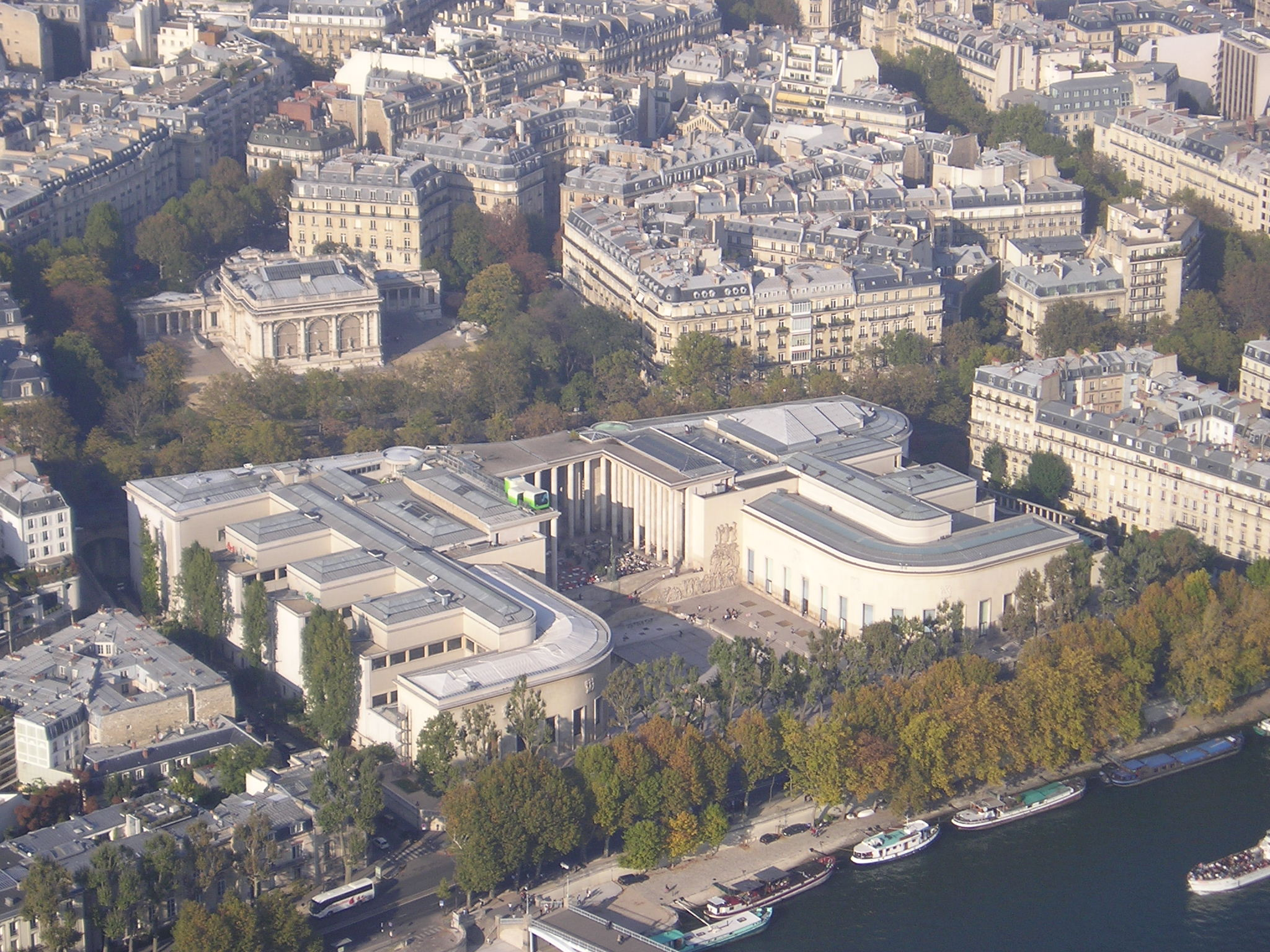
View of the Palais de Tokyo, seen from the Eiffel Tower. The eastern wing is on the right.

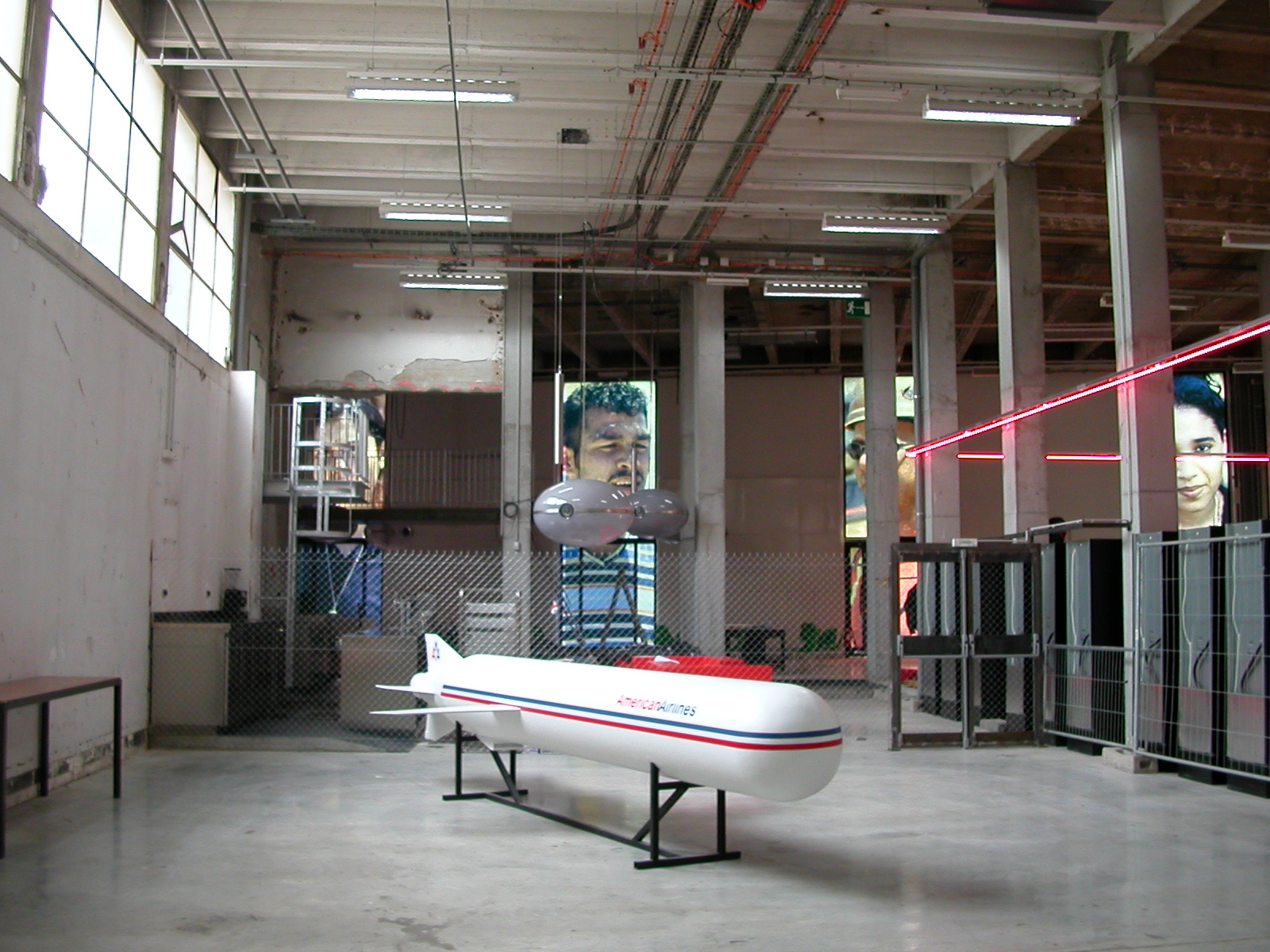
An exhibition in the Palais de Tokyo / Site de création contemporaine.

The Palais de Tokyo (Tokyo Palace) is a building dedicated to modern and contemporary art, located at 13 avenue du Président-Wilson, facing the Trocadéro, in the 16th arrondissement of Paris. The eastern wing of the building belongs to the City of Paris, and hosts the Musée d'Art Moderne de Paris (Paris' Museum of Modern Art). The western wing belongs to the French state and since 2002, has hosted the Palais de Tokyo / Site de création contemporaine, the largest museum in France dedicated to temporary exhibitions of contemporary art.

The building is separated from the River Seine by the Avenue de New-York, which was formerly named Quai Debilly and later Avenue de Tokio (from 1918 to 1945). The name Palais de Tokyo derives from the name of this street. The Iéna station on Line 9 of the Paris Metro is located very close to the museum.

== History ==
The monument was inaugurated by President Lebrun on 24 May 1937, at the time of the International Exposition of Art and Technology in Modern Life (1937). The original name of the building was Palais des Musées d'art moderne ("Palace of the Museums of modern art"). The building has since then hosted a number of establishments, projects, and creative spaces. Among them; le musée d'art et d'essai (1977–1986), the FEMIS, the Centre national de la photographie, and in 1986, the Palais du cinéma. The current contemporary art center opened to the public in March 2002, under the new name Site de création contemporaine ("Site for contemporary creation"), specializing in the emerging French and international art scene. It was overhauled and expanded in 2012, by the architects Anne Lacaton and Jean-Philippe Vassal, who subsequently won the Pritzker Prize. With no permanent collection, it is "reputed to be the biggest non-collecting contemporary art museum in Europe", and produces all of its exhibitions.

== Directors ==
In March 2002, Nicolas Bourriaud and Jérôme Sans launched the Site de création contemporaine in the west wing of Palais de Tokyo. It soon became simply known as Palais de Tokyo, quickly making its mark as a trendsetter in the art world.

The Palais de Tokyo has since been led by the following:

- 2006–2012: Marc-Olivier Wahler
- 2012–2018: Jean de Loisy
- 2021–2022: Emma Lavigne
- 2022–present: Guillaume Désanges

== Le Pavillon ==
The Pavillon ran from 2001 to 2017, and facilitated over 130 international artists. Intended as a studio and laboratory space for resident artists and curators invited to the project, the Pavillon was an experimental program, designed to demonstrate the resident artists' youthful creativity. Since the opening of the building, the director of the programme was artist and filmmaker, Ange Leccia. The residency programme was sponsored by Banque Neuflize OBC, The Ministry of Culture and Communication, and the Cité internationale des arts.

=== Notable Pavillon residents ===
- Emma Dusong (Knight of the Order of the Arts and the Letters, 2020)
- Mati Diop (Grand Prix Cannes Festival, 2019)
- Angela Detanico and Rafaël Lain (Brazilian Pavilion, Venice Art Biennale, 2007)
- Andreas Fogarasi (Hungarian Pavilion and Golden Lion Prize, Venice Art Biennale, 2007)
- Laurent Grasso (Marcel Duchamp Prize 2007)
- Apichatpong Weerasethakul (Palme d’or Cannes Festival, 2010)
- Isabelle Cornaro (the Ricard Foundation Prize, 2010)
- Benoît Maire (the Ricard Foundation Prize, 2010)
- Koki Tanaka (Special Mention of the Japan pavilion, Venice Art Biennale, 2013)
- Oliver Beer (Daiwa Foundation Prize, 2015)

=== All Pavillon residents ===
All Pavillon residents, by year
Year residency started	Artist	Nationality
2001	Charlotte Beaurepaire	France
2001	Kim Sop Boninsegni	Switzerland/France
2001	Gérald	France
2001	Emily Joyce	United States
2001	Alexandre Pollazzon	France
2001	Julia Rometti	France
2001	Apichatpong Weerasethakul	Thailand
2002	Quentin Armand	France
2002	Angela Detanico	Brazil
2002	Andreas Fogarasi	Austria
2002	Rafael Lain	Brazil
2002	Adriana Lara Dominguez	Mexico
2002	Lucas Mancione	France
2002	Nicolas Milhe	France
2002	Émilie Renard	France
2002	Jiri Skala	Csechia
2002	Johann Van Aerden	France
2002	Gabriela Vanga	Romania
2003	Ziad Antar	Lebanon
2003	Louidgi Beltrame	France
2003	Davide Bertocchi	Italy
2003	Sophie Dubosc	France
2003	Johannes Fricke Waldthausen	Netherlands
2003	Shiho Fukuhara	Japan
2003	Agnieszka Kurant	Poland
2003	Gerald Petit	France
2004	Marcelline Delbecq	France
2004	Alice Guareschi	Italy
2004	André Guedes	Portugal
2004	Corentin Hamel	France
2004	Nicolas Juillard	France
2004	Anne-Laure Maison	France
2004	Benjamin Martin	USA/France
2005	Liliana Basarab	Romania
2005	Isabelle Cornaro	France
2005	Adriana Garcia Galan	Columbia
2005	Benoît Maire	France
2005	Mihnea Mircan	Romania
2005	Wagner Morales	Brazil
2005	Émilie Pitoiset	France
2005	Koki Tanaka	Japan
2005	Adam Vackar	Czechia
2006	Alex Cecchetti	Italy
2006	Duvier Del Dago Fernandez	Cuba
2006	Mati Diop	France
2006	Manu Laskar	France
2006	Jaime Lutzo	United States
2006	Cova Macías	Spain
2006	Denis Savary	Switzerland
2006	Jean-Luc Vincent	France
2007	Meris Angioletti	Italy
2007	Jose Arnaud Bello	Mexico
2007	Gaëlle Boucand	France
2007	Niklas Goldbach	Germany
2007	K.G. Guttman	Canada
2007	Romain Kronenberg	France
2007	Charlotte Moth	United Kingdom
2007	Jorge Satorre Domenech	Mexico
2007	Andreas Siqueland	Norway
2007	Stéphane Vigny	France
2008	Pedro Barateiro	Portugal
2008	Emma Dusong	France
2008	Isa Griese	Germany
2008	Louise Hervé	France
2008	Chloé Maillet	France
2008	Matteo Rubbi	Italy
2008	Axel Straschnoy	Argentina
2008	Iris Touliatou GR	Greece
2008	Gilles Toutevoix	France
2009	Andrea Acosta	Columbia
2009	Patrick Bock	France/USA
2009	Haizea Barcenilla Garcia	Spain
2009	Davide Cascio	Switzerland
2009	Anthony Lanzenberg	France
2009	Florence Ostende	France
2009	Jorge Pedro Núñez	Venezuela
2009	Samir Ramdani	France
2009	Ramiro Guerreiro	Portugal
2010	Jérome Allavena	France
2010	Einat Amir	Israel
2010	Elisabeth S. Clark	United Kingdom/USA
2010	Gintaras Didziarapetris	Lithuania
2010	Alexandra Ferreira	Portugal
2010	Morten Norbye Halvorsen	Norway
2010	Estelle Nabeyrat	France/Germany
2010	Fabrice Pichat	France
2010	Charlotte Seidel	France
2010	Betina Wind	Germany
2011	Laëtitia Badut Haussmann	France
2011	Oliver Beer	United Kingdom
2011	Fouad Bouchoucha	France
2011	Eglé Budvytytè	Lithuania
2011	Onejoon Che	South Korea
2011	Anthea Hamilton	United Kingdom
2011	Egija Inzule	Latvia
2011	Hélène Meisel	France
2011	Noé Soulier	France
2011	Oriol Vilanova	Spain
2012	Carlotta Bailly-Borg	France
2012	Feiko Beckers	Netherlands
2012	Julie Béna	France
2012	Daiga Grantina	Latvia
2012	Francesco Fonassi	Italy
2012	Peter Miller	United States
2012	Julien Perez	France
2012	Agnieszka Ryszkiewicz	Poland
2012	Gonçalo Sena	Portugal
2012	Theo Turpin	United Kingdom
2012	Lucas Biberson	France
2013	Sophie Bonnet-Pourpet	France
2013	Rebecca Digne	France
2013	Guillaume Henry	France
2013	Chai Siris	Thailand
2013	Mikhail Lylov	Russia
2013	Sébastien Martinez Barat	France
2013	Karin Schlageter	France
2013	Clémence Seilles	France
2013	Antonio Vega Macotela	Mexico
2013	Yonatan Vinitsky	Israel/Poland
2014	Aung-Ko	Myanmar
2014	Basma Alsharif	Kuwait/Palestine/France/USA
2014	Charbel-Joseph H. Boutros	Lebanon
2014	Jonathan Martin	France
2014	Keiichiro Shibuya	Japan
2014	Shelly Nadashi	Israel
2015	Ayoung Kim	South Korea
2015	Jean-Alain Corre	France
2015	Alexis Guillier	France
2015	Hoël Duret	France
2015	Lou Lim	Philippines
2015	Ollie Palmer	United Kingdom
2016	Manolis Daskalakis-Lemos	Greece
2016	Lola Gonzàlez	France
2016	Taloi Havini	Papua New Guinea
2016	Yu Ji	China
2016	Thomas Teurlai	France
2016	Wataru Tominaga	Japan

== Palais / ==
The Museum also publishes the magazine Palais /, which annually releases three editions (Spring, Fall, and Summer) and was created in 2006 by Marc-Olivier Wahler. The Magazine features articles centering around a central artistic theme selected for each edition. The subjects are conceptual, and are explored using photography, various artistic media, essays, and often experimental media. The theme generally coincides with the exhibition concurrently featured at the museum.

In addition to Palais /, Palais de Tokyo also published five volumes of a contemporary art encyclopedia, From Yodeling to Quantum Physics between 2007 and 2011.

== See also ==
- Art Deco in Paris
- List of museums in Paris
- List of largest art museums
