= Biennale de Paris =

French art festival

Coordinates: 48°52′01″N 2°19′59″E

The Biennale de Paris (English: Paris Biennale) was a noted French art festival, established in 1959. In 1983, the organization ceased functions, until its reestablishment in 2000 with the first exhibition of the new era occurring in 2004. The organization ran the festival until 2021, when the organization announced it would "“turn the page of the Biennale, in order to set up a new event," focusing instead on luxury crafts.

The Biennale's mission is to promote art and artists which challenge current conventions in the art world.

The Biennale de Paris rejects exhibitions and art objects. It refuses to be "thought by art". It identifies and defends true alternatives. It calls for "non-standard practices".

== History ==
Inspired by the Venice Biennale, the Menton Biennale and the São Paulo Art Biennial, the 'Biennale de Paris' was created by André Malraux, the Minister of Culture, in 1959 and headed by Raymond Cogniat. Cogniat held the position as director until 1967, when he resigned due to health concerns. He was succeeded by Jacques Lassaigne who lead the institution until its decommissioning in 1985. The initial goal of the Biennale was to present an overview of young creativity worldwide and to create a place of experiences and meetings; this was achieved partly with an international jury and the institution of an upper age limit of 35 years for submitted artists.

Held every two years from 1959 to 1985, it was eventually decommissioned by the Ministry of Culture for a multitude of reasons including the rise of competing art exhibitions in Paris and the removal of the age requirements for artists. After its decommissioning, there were several failed attempts to revive the exhibition. In 1993, Alfred Pacquement headed attempts to restore and finance a new edition of the Biennale, but the plans were ultimately dropped. In 2000, Alexandre Gurita headed the reestablishment of the Biennale as a public institution with a focus on challenging and pushing conventions of contemporary art. With support from contemporary artists and art critics, the Biennale put on its first exhibition since 1985 in 2004, and continues to run with its emphasis on non-traditional art forms.

The revived version of the Bienniale came to an end in 2021, following years of controversies around forgery and economic stresses due to the COVID-19 pandemic.

== Presentations of the Biennale ==
=== 1959 Edition ===
From the 2nd to the 25th of October 1959, Musée d'Art Moderne de Paris

Jean-Claude Bédard, Jean-Claude Bertrand, Pierre Bonnard, Gérald Collot, Simone Dat, James Ensor, Pierre Fichet, Henri Matisse, Piet Mondrian, Emil Nolde, Georges Rouault, Suzanne Valadon, Édouard Vuillard, André Derain, Raoul Dufy, Paul Klee, Albert Marquet, Kees van Dongen, Jacques Villon, Maurice Vlaminck, Georges Braque, Marc Chagall, Robert Delaunay, Max Ernst, Roger de La Fresnaye, Juan Gris, Marcel Gromaire, Claude Grosperrin, Oskar Kokoschka, Fernand Léger, André Lhote, André Masson, Amedeo Modigliani, Yehuda Neiman, Julius Pascin (Julius Mordecai Pincas), Constant Permeke, Pablo Picasso, Gino Severini, Chaïm Soutine, Louis Trabuc, Maurice Utrillo, Jacques Winsberg, Yasuo Mizui.

=== 1961 Edition ===
From the 29th of September to the 5th of November 1961, Musée d'Art Moderne de Paris

Pierre Alechinsky, Arman, Philippe Bonnet, Bernard Buffet, Henri Cueco, Simone Dat, Raymond Hains, David Hockney, Jasper Johns, Jean-Marie Ledannois, Jean Le Gac, Robert Nicoïdski, Martial Raysse, Juan Luis Rodriguez Sibaja, Victor Roman, Toulouse-Lautrec, Louis Trabuc, Jean-Pierre Vielfaure, Jacques Villeglé, École de Paris, Non figurative art.

=== 1963 Edition ===
From the 28th of September to the 3rd of November 1963, Musée d'Art Moderne de Paris

Antonio Segui, Christo, Niki de Saint Phalle, Pierre Schaeffer, Pierre Boulez, Iannis Xenakis, Peter Blake, David Hockney, Nicolas Schöffer, Jacques Brissot, Vassili Kandinsky, Salvador Dalí, Groupe Mu, Groupe Lettriste, Groupe de Recherche d'Art Visuel (GRAV), Groupe des Aluchromistes Belges.

=== 1965 Edition ===
From the 28th of September to the 3rd of November 1965, Musée d'Art Moderne de Paris

Christian Boltanski, Erik Dietmann, Daniel Buren, Jean-Pierre Le Boul'ch, Carlo Marangio, Michel Moskovtchenko, Peter Stampfli, Yvan Theys, Gérard Titus-Carmel, Niele Toroni, Vladimir Velickovic, Bernar Venet, Jean-Pierre Raynaud, Peter Blake, Groupe Lettriste, Pierre Buraglio, Jean de Gaspary

=== 1967 Edition ===
From the 29th of September to the 5th of November 1967, Musée d'Art Moderne de Paris

Pierre Schaeffer, Martial Raysse, Jean-Pierre Raynaud, Groupe de recherches musicales, BMPT, Groupe Lettriste, John Max, Henry Saxe, Pierre Hébert (cinéaste), Al Sens.

=== 1969 Edition ===
From the 24th of September to the 1st of November 1969, Musée d'Art Moderne de Paris

Giulio Paolini, Jannis Kounellis, Les Levine, Southwest Coming Together, Elektradermis, La modification, Utopie, Interplay, Ens musical, Nihilist Spasm Band, Vidéo-Dom, Automat, Medikit, Groupe AAT, Benedicto Cabrera.

=== 1971 Biennale ===
From the 15th of September to the 21st of October 1971, Parc floral de Paris, Bois de Vincennes

Joseph Kosuth, Art and Language, Robert Barry, Victor Burgin, Monika Baumgartl, Alighiero e Boetti, Vito Acconci, Bruce Nauman, Bernard Dreyfus, Dan Graham, Dennis Oppenheim, Richard Serra, Lawrence Weiner, Richard Long, Joseph Beuys, Daniel Buren, Gilbert and George.

=== 1973 Edition ===
From the 15th of September to the 21st of October 1973, Musée d'Art Moderne de Paris

Les artistes anonymes, Michael Asher, Groupe 70, Giulio Paolini, Anne et Patrick Poirier, Telewissen Groupe, Druga Grupa, Christian Jaccard, Markus Lüppertz, Goran Trbuljak, François Rouan, Douwe Jan Bakker, György Jovánovics, James Coleman, Denis Rivière, Düsseldorfer Szene, Pedro Uhart.

=== 1975 Edition ===
From the 19th of September to the 2nd of November 1975, Musée d'Art Moderne de Paris, Palais Galliera

Gordon Matta-Clark, Eventstructure Research Group, Antoni Muntadas, Marina Abramovic, John M. Armleder, Christian Boltanski, Luciano Castelli, Valie Export, Terry Fox, Rébecca Horn, Urs Lüthi, Krzysztof Wodiczko, Noël Dolla, COUM Transmissions (Genesis P-Orridge et Cosey Fanni Tutti).

=== 1977 Edition ===
From the 17th of September to the 1st of November 1977, Palais de Tokyo, Musée d'Art Moderne de Paris

Laurie Anderson, Raymonde Arcier, Sandro Chia, Francesco Clemente, Ralston Farina, Tina Girouard, Anselm Kiefer, Paul Kos, Mary Lucier, Annette Messager, Claudio Parmiggiani, Adrian Piper, Claude Sandoz, Groupe 143, Groupe de 4, Groupe Untel

To celebrate the Biennale's 10th showing, French critic and curator Daniel Abadie and Georges Boudaille (Biennale Chief Commissioner) organized a retrospective of works by artists who had participated in past editions of the Paris Biennale. Selected artists included Helen Frankenthaler, Robert Rauschenberg, Jasper Johns, Jack Youngerman, Ed Ruscha, John McCracken, Don Eddy, Joseph Kosuth, and John De Andrea.

=== 1980 Edition ===
From the 20th of September to the 2nd of November 1980, Musée d'Art Moderne de Paris

Sophie Calle, Alain Fleischer, Gloria Friedmann, Mimmo Paladino, Paul Devautour, Tony Oursler, Martine Aballéa, Groupe Normal, Groupe Etcetera, Paisaje Imaginario, Saeta om production, Socialist Patient Kollective, ATEM, ECART, System'art, Milton Becerra.

=== 1982 Edition ===
From the 2nd of October to the 14th of November 1982, Musée d'Art Moderne de Paris

Guillaume Bijl, Groupe CADA, Philippe Favier, Groupe FRIGO, Claude Leveque, Georges Rousse, Groupe Zardee, Bill Woodrow, Anish Kapoor, Non Groupe, Groupe Dioptre, Peter d'Agostino, Collaborative Work, Die Tödliche Doris, Yann Minh, Un Drame Musical Instantané.

=== 1985 Edition ===
From the 21st of March to the 21st of May 1985, Grande halle de la Villette

John Ahearn, Robert Ashley, John Baldessari, Józef Czapski, Richard Deacon, Luciano Fabro, Peter Fischli, Jenny Holzer, Anish Kapoor, Joseph Kosuth, Nam June Paik, Per Kirkeby, Bertrand Lavier, Roberto Matta, Mario Merz, Reinhard Mucha, Gerhard Richter, Julian Schnabel, Frank Stella, Jeff Wall, Keith Haring.

=== 2004 Edition ===
From the 20th of February to the 15th of March 2004, Paris et ailleurs

Ikhéa©services, Ricardo Mbarak, Ultralab, Le Club des pêcheurs, Musée du point de vue, Musée des dommages, musée des nuages, EAMO, Paul Robert-coureur de fond, Thermo-hygrographe, École du vin de Paris, ATSA, Supernova, Soussan Ltd, Visualinguistic, GRNC, IPAC, N55.

=== 2006-2008 Edition ===
From the 1st of October 2006 to the 30th of September 2008, Paris, varied countries and regions

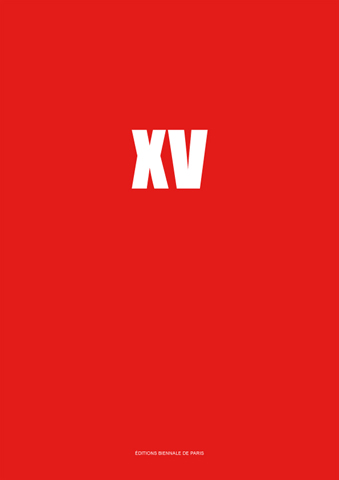
Cover for the 15th edition of the Biennale de Paris.

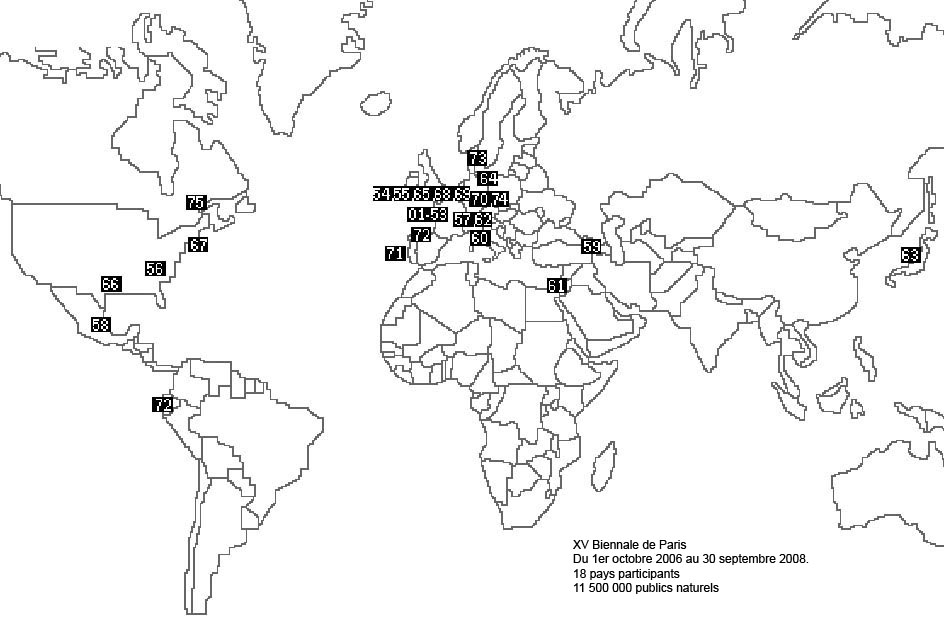
Map of locations of expositions for the 15th Biennale de Paris, 2006–2008.

Soussan Ltd, Jean-Baptiste Farkas, Alexandre Gurita, François Deck, Ricardo Mbarkho, Glitch, Gary Bigot, Geoff Bunn, Brian Holmes, OSTSA, Courants Faibles, Au Travail/At Work, Paul Robert, Karen Andreassian, Hubert Renard, RS, Microcollection, musée des nuages, Michel Chevalier, Olivier Darné, Bernard Delville, Sabine Falk, Dominic Gagnon, Karine Lebrun, La Chèvre Phénomène, Saint-Thomas l'Imposteur, André Éric Létourneau, Florian Brochec, Nana Petzet, That's Painting Productions, Les Somnatistes, Liliane Viala, Stephen Wright, Jean-Claude Moineau.

==== Exhibitions of the 2006-2008 Biennale de Paris ====
- The XV Biennale de Paris at the Art Gallery of Knoxville, Tennessee »
- That's Painting Productions

== Creeds ==
- Orientations - The Biennale de Paris rejects exhibitions and art objects. It refuses to be "thought by art". It identifies and defends true alternatives. It calls for "non-standard practices"
- Strategy - To be liquid. If the ground floor is occupied, occupy the floor below.
- An Invisual Art - No serious proof exists that art is dependent on the art object. We can therefore assume the opposite. The Biennale de Paris promotes invisual practices which do not need to be seen to exist. The invisual is visible but not as art.
- A Non-Artistic Art - The Biennale de Paris defends an art which does not obey the common criteria for art: creative, emotive, aesthetic, spectacular...
- An Art which Operates in Everyday Reality - The Biennale de Paris promotes practices that relegate art to the background in order to conquer everyday reality.
- A Public of Indifference - With the Biennale de Paris there are no more art spectacles. The Biennale addresses what it calls "a public of indifference": persons who, consciously or accidentally, interact with propositions that can no longer be identified as artistic.
- A Unified Criticism - Organised as a network, the Biennale de Paris constitutes a critical mass composed of hundreds of initiatives, which would otherwise have been isolated and without impact.
- A Horizontal Institution - The Biennale de Paris works horizontally. To participate means to become a partner. As such each partner decides the conditions linked to his or her proposed activities. This decision-making power acts on the structure and state of mind of the Biennale.

== Curators, art historians, art theoricians, art critics since 1959 ==
Catherine Millet, Alfred Pacquement, Jean-Marc Poinsot, Daniel Abadie, Lucy R. Lippard, Pontus Hulten, Gérald Gassiot-Talabot, Achille Bonito Oliva, Pierre Restany, Pierre Courcelles, Paul Ardenne, Stephen Wright, Francesco Masci, Brian Holmes, Elisabeth Lebovici.

== From 1959 to 2008, the Biennale de Paris presented works of artists such as ==
=== A ===
Alberto Gironella, Alighiero Boetti, André Éric Létourneau, Anish Kapoor,

=== B ===
Bernard Brunon (That's Painting Productions), Bernard Delville, Bureau d'Etudes,

=== C ===
Chinnapan Jesudoss Anthony Doss, Christian Boltanski, Christo, Cosey Fanni Tutti,

=== D-F ===
Dan Graham, Daniel Buren, Dominic Gagnon, Florian Brochec, Francois Deck,

=== G ===
Gage Taylor (1975 he was featured in the Paris Biennalle at the Museum of Modern Art ("Mindscapes From The New Land")) Gary Bigot, Gilbert and George, Giulio Paolini, Gordon Matta-Clark,

=== H-I ===
Horst Antes, Hubert Renard, Ian Burn,

=== J ===
Jan Middlebos, Jayant Parikh, Jean-Baptiste Farkas, Johannes Heisig, John M. Armleder, Joseph Beuys, Joseph Kosuth,

=== K ===
Karen Andreassian, Karine Lebrun, Kees Brusse,

=== L ===
La Bergerie, La Chèvre Phénomène, Lawrence Weiner, Les Somnatistes, Liliane Viala,

=== M ===
Marcel Duchamp, Mario Merz, Michel Chevalier, Michelangelo Pistoletto, Microcollection,

=== N-O ===
Nam June Paik, Nana Petzet (That's Painting Productions) Niele Toroni, Olivier Darné, OSTSA,

=== P ===
Pablo Picasso, Paratene Matchitt, Park Seo-Bo, Paul Robert,

=== R ===
René Daniëls, Ricardo Mbarkho, Richard Serra, Robert Smithson, Rodolfo Nieto, Rolf Glasmeier,

=== S ===
Sabine Falk, Sadequain Saint-Thomas l'Imposteur, Sérgio de Camargo, Soussan Ltd,

=== T-Y ===
Thierry Boutonnier, Visualinguistic, Winston Branch, Wolf Vostell, Yasuo Mizui, Yves Klein,

== Associated institutions ==
- Archives de la Critique d’Art in Rennes, Official website
- L'Ecole Nationale d'Art de Paris, Official website
- The Kandinsky Library, Official website
- Decentralized Invisual Art Market, Official website
- Centre de Documentation, de Recherche et d’Application des Offensives, Official website
- Institut de Recherche Internationale en Anthropologie de la Singularité, Official website
