= Camila Oliveira Fairclough =

Brazilian and British painter, based in Paris

- Born: 1979 (age 46–47); Rio de Janeiro, Brazil
- Education: École nationale supérieure des Beaux-Arts
- Known for: Painting
- Website: camila-oliveira-fairclough.info

Camila Oliveira Fairclough (born 1979) is a Brazilian, British and French artist who lives and works in Paris

== Early life ==
She studied at the Escola de Artes Visuais do Parque Lage in Rio de Janeiro with Nelson Leirner, and at the Beaux-Arts de Paris with Jean-Marc Bustamante, Sylvie Fanchon, Dominique Figarella and Bernard Piffaretti.

== Work ==
Her artistic practice focuses primarily on painting, while also extending to artists' books and curatorial projects. Her paintings frequently use words, signs and imagery drawn from everyday visual culture. Oliveira Fairclough is represented by Ellen de Bruijne Projects in Amsterdam. Her work has also been exhibited at galleries including Emmanuel Hervé, Laurent Godin, Nosbaum Reding, Cavalo, Air de Paris, Praz-Delavallade and Galerie van Gelder.

In 2022 she curated the exhibition Chocolate Fresa Vainilla at the Galería Luis Adelantado in Valencia, bringing together the works of Armando Andrade Tudela, Claude Closky, Robbin Heyker, David Hominal, Jan Kiefer, Ana Mazzei, Rasmus Nilausen, Alain Séchas, Hank Schmidt in der Beek, Sarah Tritz, Emmanuel Van der Meulen, Elsa Werth, Emmanuelle Castellan, Daniel Graham Loxton, among others, and with Sylvie Fanchon the exhibition Aoulioulé at the MRAC in Sérignan with a selection of works around and about language from Walter Swennen, Anne-Lise Coste, Jessica Diamond, Joseph Kosuth, Gene Beery, Karina Bisch, Nicolas Chardon, Júlio Villani, Virginie Yassef, Rémy Zaugg and others.

Selected exhibitions include:

- Répétition, Centre Pompidou-Metz, 2024
- La main (et) le gant, Musée Jenisch, Vevey, 2024
- Paint Every Day, B09K / Lunar Practices, Hunan, 2024
- Made With, Papai Contemporary, Oslo, 2024
- Janaina, Florence Loewy, Paris, 2025
- Live, Love, Laugh, Ellen de Bruijne Projects, Amsterdam, 2025
- Super Pop Conceptuel, Fondation CAB, Brussels, 2025
- Le Jeu de la rose et du carré – 8 Flags, Nouveau Musée National de Monaco, 2026
- Points, Lignes, Plans, curated by Mathieu Mercier, Galerie Le Minotaure, Paris, 2026
- Pintura, Villa du Parc, Annemasse, 2026

Oliveira Fairclough has also produced public artworks, including a permanent work for Rennes Métropole's Line B metro and a work for the Nantes Busway. She has taken part in artist residencies with the Centre Pompidou Accélérations programme.

== Collections ==
Her work is held in public collections including the Centre Pompidou, CNAP – Centre national des arts plastiques, FNAC – Fonds national d'art contemporain, FRAC Île-de-France, FRAC Alsace, FRAC Pays de la Loire, FRAC Bretagne, FRAC Normandie, École nationale supérieure des Beaux-Arts de Paris, Musée des Beaux-Arts de Brest, Musée des Beaux-Arts de Rennes, Musée régional d'art contemporain Occitanie/Pyrénées-Méditerranée, Cabinet du livre d'artiste and BPS22 – Musée d'art de la Province de Hainaut. Her work is also held in the Norac Collection and in several international private collections.

== Selected bibliography ==
- Armer les toboggans: Robert Breer, Pierre Labat, Camila Oliveira Fairclough, Quimper: Le Quartier Editions, 2013 ISBN 978-2-908939590
- Camila Oliveira Fairclough, Paint Everyday, texts by Jill Gasparina and Victor Guégan, Éditions B42, 2025, 144 p., ISBN 9782494983342
- Paulo Miyada, “Camila Oliveira Fairclough”, critical text on the artist's work.
- Jérôme Dupeyrat, Entretiens: perspectives contemporaines sur les publications d'artistes, Saint-Senoux: Incertain sens, 2018 ISBN 978-2-914291781
- Arlène Berceliot Courtin, “Camila Oliveira Fairclough”, Slash Paris, 2014.
- Forsythia, lilac and geranium, with Elsa Werth, Saint-Senoux: Incertain sens, 2021, ISBN 978-2-914291-95-8
- Camila Oliveira Fairclough : Marble Memo, Montbeliard: Le 19, Centre d'Art Contemporain, 2010 ISBN 978-2-350750668
