= FRAC des Pays de la Loire =

French regional collection of contemporary art

The FRAC des Pays de la Loire is a public collection of contemporary art of the Pays de la Loire region in France, part of the national FRAC network. It is in Carquefou. A second venue is expected to open in Nantes in April 2021.

== History ==
Its purpose is to build an international collection and organize exhibitions in the region. It has also run a residency program since 1984.

The collection was created in 1982 and first settled in the Royal Abbey of Fontevraud. In 1988, it moved to the Villa of La Garenne-Lemot in Clisson. Since 2000, it has been based in Carquefou in a building designed by Jean-Claude Pondevie, specially conceived to meet its conservation and exhibition missions.

It was directed by Jean de Loisy from 1983 to 1986, by Guy Trotosa from 1986 to 1988, by Jean-François Taddei from 1988 to 2004, by Laurence Gateau from 2004 to 2021, and from 2022 onwards by Claire Staebler.

Links were forged between the Frac and the Nantes metropolitan area on the occasion of the Estuaire biennale held in 2007, 2009 and 2012. This gives greater visibility to the Frac des Pays de la Loire by offering a place of exhibition in town. It is in this context that Bruno Peinado proposes in 2014, an exhibition L'Écho / What separates. This exhibition takes place at the same time in the premises of the Frac in Carquefou and at the HAB Galerie, on Île de Nantes.

In 2013, the share of the budget allocated to artistic production decreasing, the Frac resorted to private sponsorship to carry out its missions. In this perspective, new forms of action are emerging, reaching a wider audience.

== The collection ==
The collection brings together more than 1700 art works. Its acquisition policy is to purchase works from emerging artists as well as historical art pieces. It includes painting, photography, sculpture, installation, sound, performance from Martine Aballéa, Alighiero Boetti, Christian Boltanski, Monica Bonvicini, Tea Djordjadze, Anne-Lise Coste, Lili Dujourie, Jimmie Durham, Raymond Hains, Ana Jotta, Véronique Joumard, Orlan, Gina Pane, Richard Prince, Martha Rosler, Jean-Michel Sanejouand, Peter Saul, Beat Streuli, Rosemarie Trockel, Valie Export, James Welling, among others.

== Selected exhibitions ==
- Monica Bonvicini (2009)
- Jean-Michel Sanejouand. Rétrospectivement... (Jean-Michel Sanejouand: Retrospectively...) (2012)
- Bruno Peinado. L’écho / Ce qui sépare (2014)
- Gerard Byrne. A late evening in the future (2014)
- Do it, with among others Etel Adnan, Robert Barry, Louise Bourgeois, Joan Jonas, Stephen Kaltenbach, Alison Knowles, Sol LeWitt, Cildo Meireles, Yoko Ono, and Hassan Sharif (2016)
- Amar Kanwar (2016)
- Ateliers internationaux – Journal d’un travailleur métèque du futur (International Workshop – Notes from the future: a crossbreed laborer's diary) (2017)
- Armen Eloyan (2018)
- Josephine Meckseper (2019)
- X, curated by Claude Closky, with among others Hanne Darboven, Mirtha Dermisache, Raymond Hains, Pierre Huyghe, Ana Jotta, Valérie Jouve, On Kawara, Annette Kelm, Suzanne Lafont, Micah Lexier, Allan McCollum, Annette Messager, Aleksandra Mir, Camila Oliveira Fairclough, Rafaël Rozendaal, Mladen Stilinović, Niele Toroni, Endre Tót, Penelope Umbrico, and Elsa Werth (2020–2021)

== Selected publications ==
As part of its mission to support contemporary art, the FRAC des Pays de la Loire publishes exhibition catalogs and artists' books.

- Martin Boyce, published with JPR Ringier, 2009, ISBN 978-3905770742
- Monica Bonvicini: This Hammer Means Business, published with Verlag der Buchhandlung Walther König and Museion Bozen/Bolzano, 2009, ISBN 978-3865607188
- Anne Tronche, Jean-Michel Sanejouand. Rétrospectivement..., 2012, French, ISBN 978-2081282704
- Bruno Peinado. L’écho / Ce qui sépare, 2016, French / English, ISBN 978-2906247789
- Delphine Coindet. Un choix de sculpture, 2017, French, ISBN 978-2906247925
- X, 2021, French and English, ISBN 979-10-97400-05-7
