= Dar Sader =

- Founded: 1863
- Founder: Ibrahim Sader
- Headquarters location: Beirut, Lebanon

Dar Sader (Arabic: دار صادر) is a Lebanese publishing house founded in 1863 by Ibrahim Sader. Sader also established the Public Library (al-Maktaba al-Umumiyya), which is recognized as one of the oldest Arabic libraries in the region.

== History ==
In 1863, Ibrahim Sader established the Public Library, which was later renamed Sader Library in 1907 by his son, Salim Sader. During the tenure of his grandson, Antoine Sader, the institution became widely known by its current name, Dar Sader.

The house emerged during the late 19th-century cultural renaissance in Lebanon, a period marked by a surge in literary production under the late Ottoman period and the subsequent French Mandate. Dar Sader played a pivotal role in this movement, alongside other institutions that supported prominent thinkers like Gibran Khalil Gibran and Ameen Rihani.

In 1881, Ibrahim Sader expanded his operations by purchasing the Hanna Najjar Press. By 1890, he established the Scientific Press (al-Matba'a al-Ilmiyya), managed by his son, Yusuf. In 1893, Ibrahim formally transferred the management of the Public Library and the Scientific Press to his sons, Salim and Yusuf, as a unified entity.

The partnership was dissolved in 1907, after which the library and the press operated independently while maintaining a collaborative relationship. Salim took charge of the library, while Yusuf focused on the press. Yusuf Sader specialized in legal publications and began issuing The Judicial Journal (al-Majalla al-Qada'iyya) in 1921, significantly contributing to the legal literature of Lebanon.

Throughout its history, Dar Sader has remained a key contributor to the intellectual and literary landscape of the Middle East and North Africa (MENA) region.

== See also ==
- Culture of Lebanon
