= Culture of Lebanon =

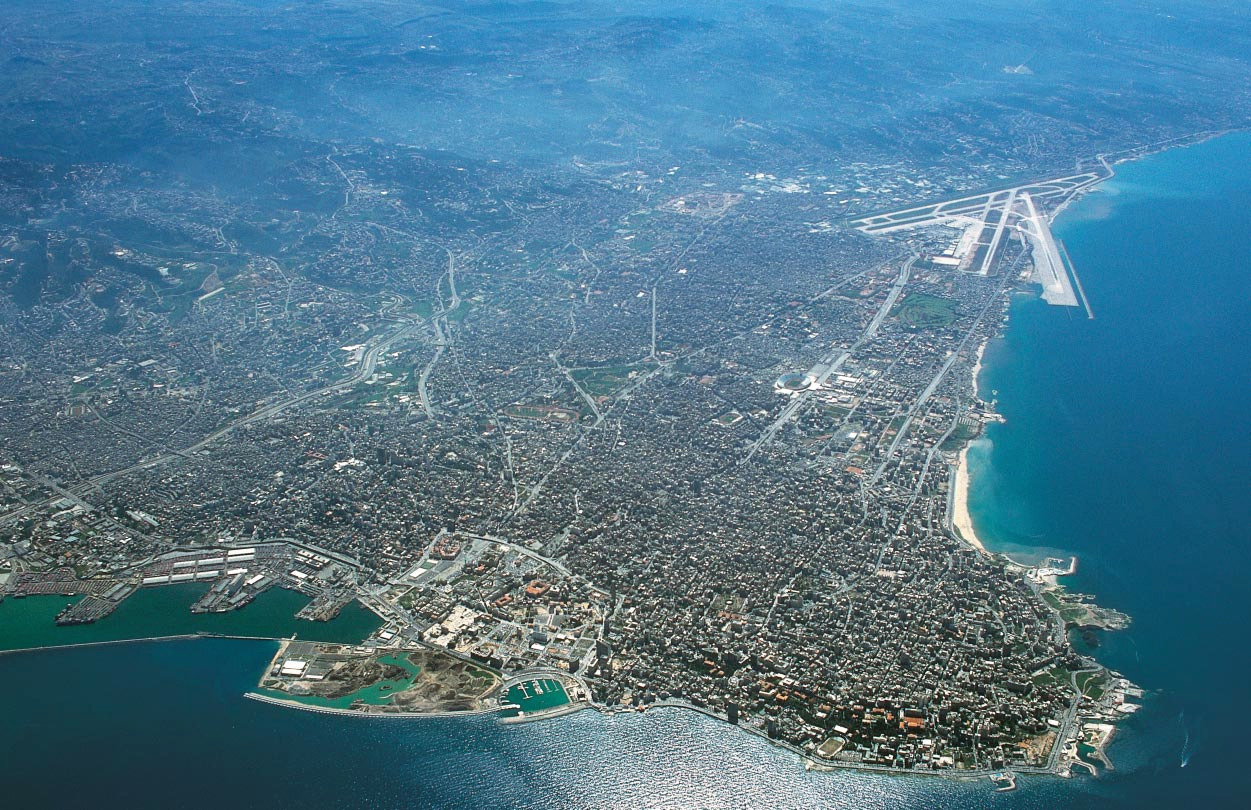
Aerial photo of Beirut, Lebanon's capital

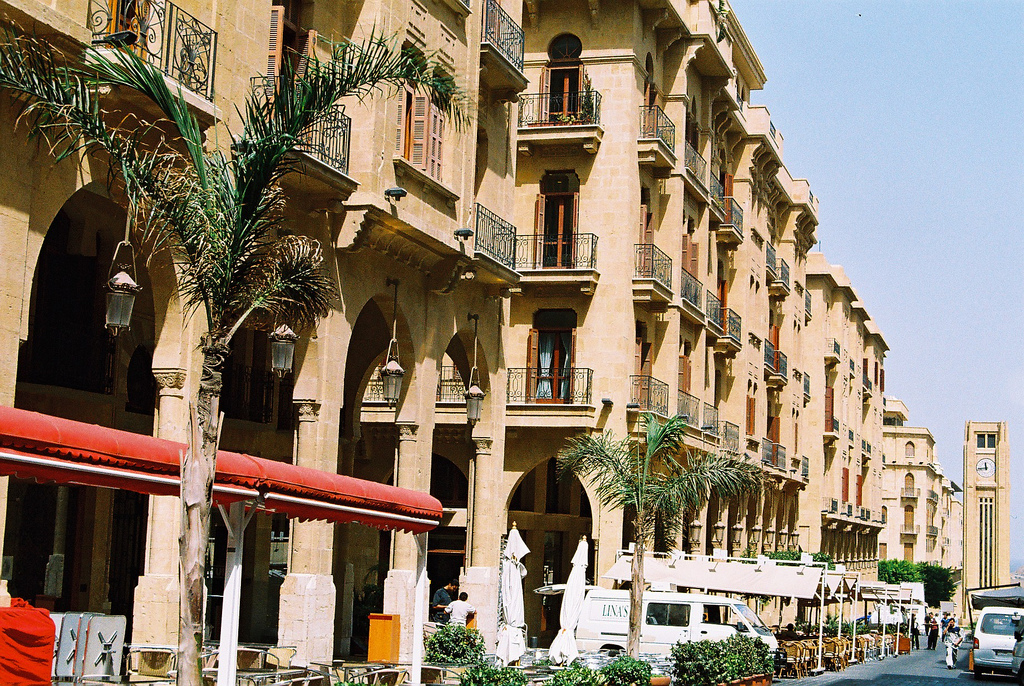
Rue Maarad is a main street in the central district

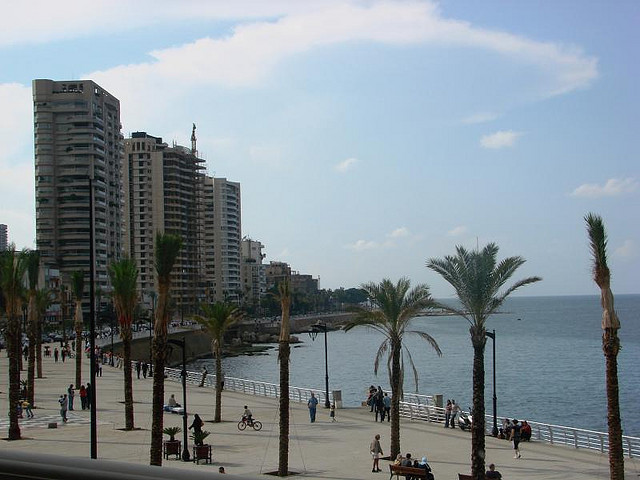
Palm trees at the seafront in Corniche Beirut

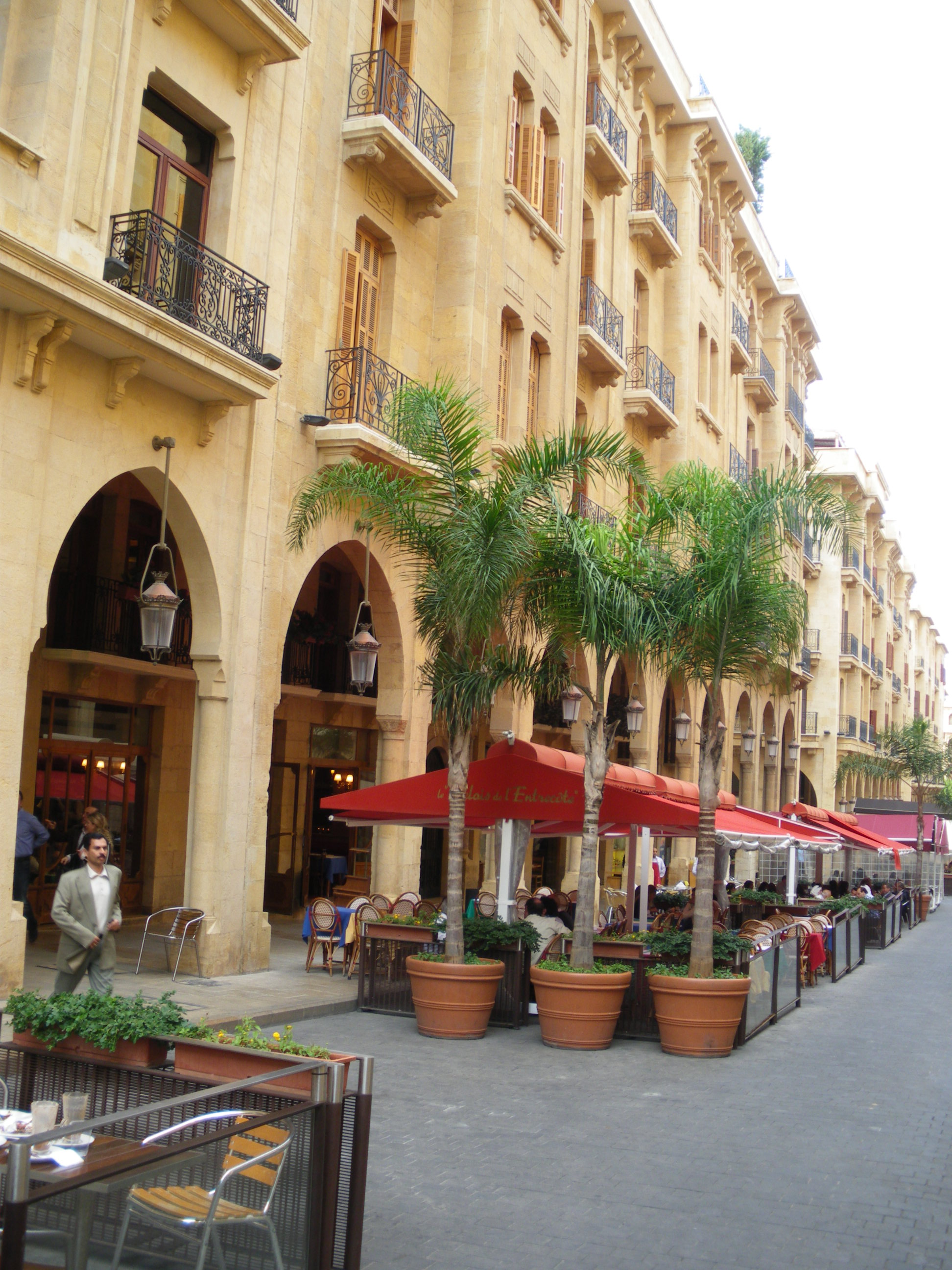
Sidewalk Cafes are a trademark of the BCD

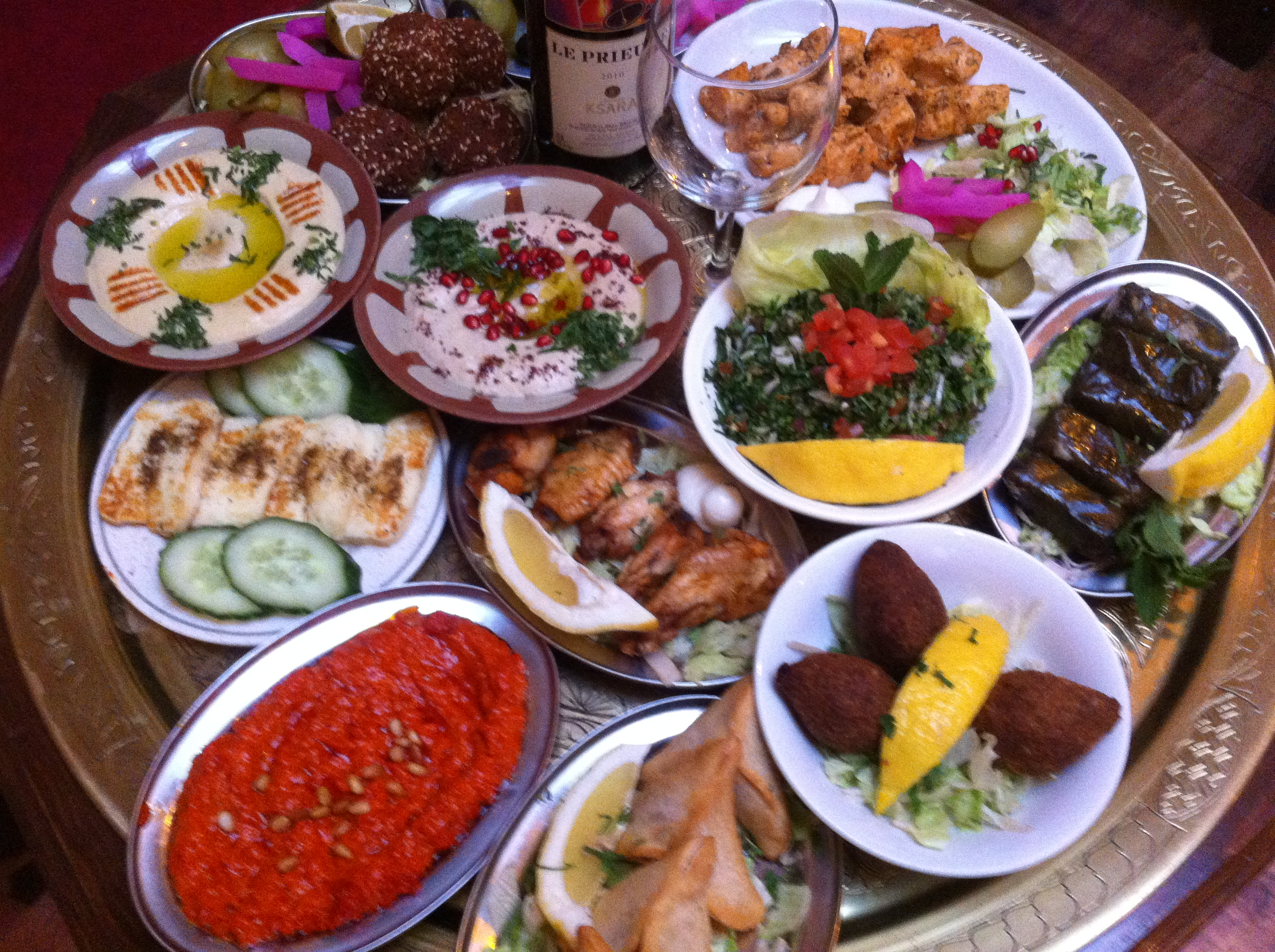
A selection of Lebanese dishes from Cafe Nouf Restaurant in London

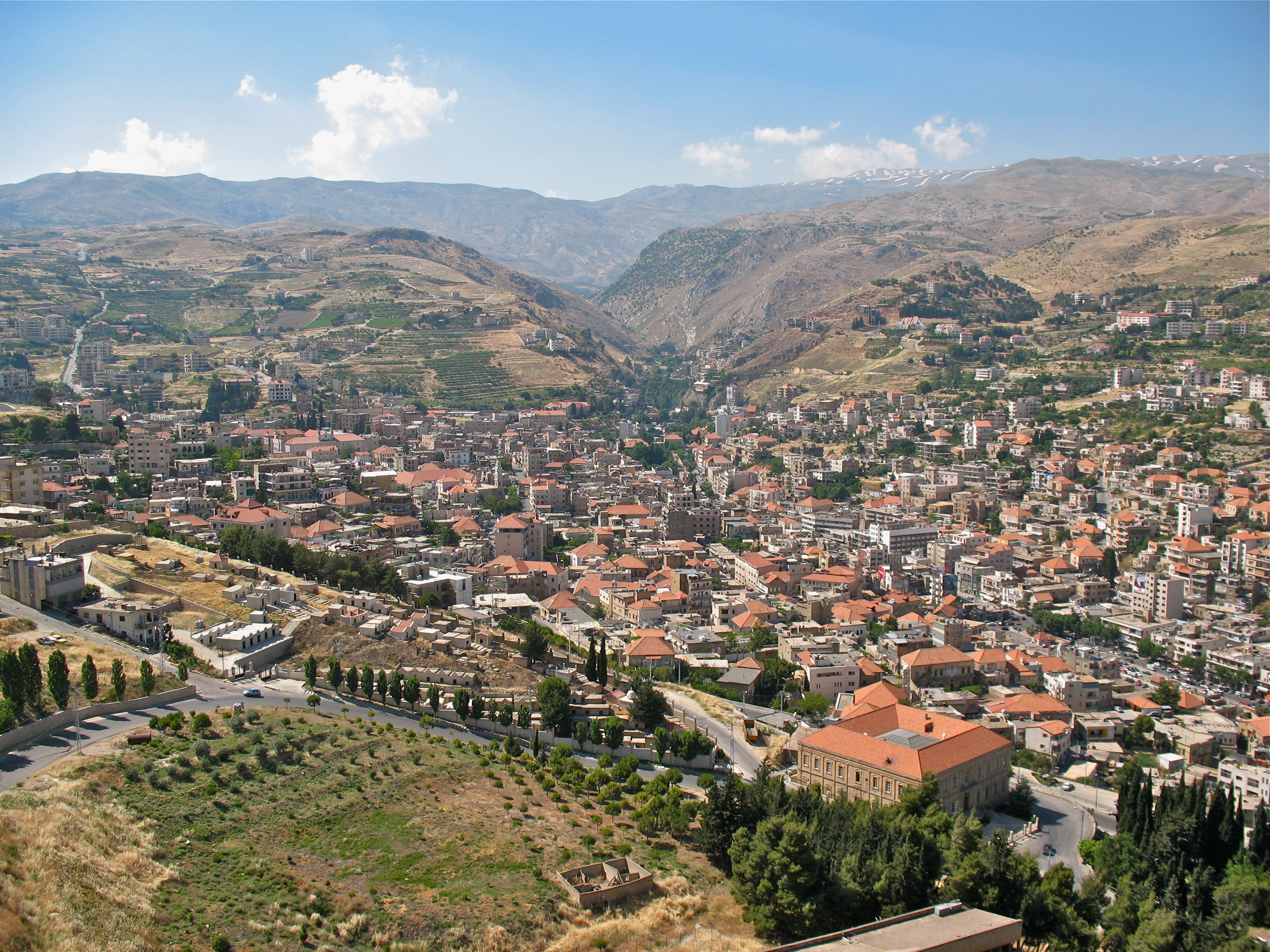
City of Zahlé at the eastern edge of the Mount Lebanon Range in eastern Lebanon

The culture of Lebanon and the Lebanese people emerged from Phoenicia and through various civilizations over thousands of years. It was home to the Phoenicians and was subsequently conquered and occupied by the Assyrians, the Greeks, the Romans, the Persians, the Arabs, the Crusaders, the Ottomans and the French. This variety is reflected in Lebanon's diverse population, composed of different religious groups, and features in the country's festivals, literature, artifacts, cuisine and architecture.

The Maronites and the Druzes founded modern Lebanon in the early eighteenth century, through the ruling and social system known as the "Maronite-Druze dualism" in Mount Lebanon Mutasarrifite. Despite the religious and denominational diversity, Lebanese share a common culture. Article 11 of the Constitution of Lebanon states: "Arabic is the official national language. A law determines the cases in which the French language is to be used". The spoken Lebanese Arabic dialect used in public mixes Arabic with French. Cuisine and literature are deep-rooted "in wider Mediterranean and Levantine norms".

The hilly Mediterranean geography of Lebanon has played a role in shaping the history of Lebanon and its culture. Archaeology of Lebanon is conducted to explore the region's past.

== Arts ==
By the turn of the 20th century, Beirut was vying with Cairo to be the major centre for Near Eastern and Middle Eastern thought, with many newspapers, magazines and literary societies. Additionally, Beirut became a thriving epicenter of Armenian culture with varied productions that was exported to the Armenian diaspora.

=== Visual arts ===
Daoud Corm (1852–1930), Habib Serour (1860–1938) and Khalil Saleeby (1870–1928) are considered the first successful professional studio artists in Lebanon, with careers extending to Europe. All were trained outside Lebanon, with Corm and Serour attending Roman academies and Saleeby British and American ones. They were known for portraiture of Lebanese high society and men of religion, as well as Christian sacred art in the case of Corm and Serour.

Mustafa Farroukh (1901–1957) was one of Lebanon's most important painters between the 1920s and the 1950s. Formally trained in Rome and Paris, he exhibited in venues from Paris to New York to Beirut over his career.

Farid Mansour (1929–2010) was a Lebanese multi-talented painter and sculptor . Being trained in Italy and England, Mansour mastered several painting and sculpting techniques. His works were exhibited in London, Paris, New York as well as Lebanon and Syria.

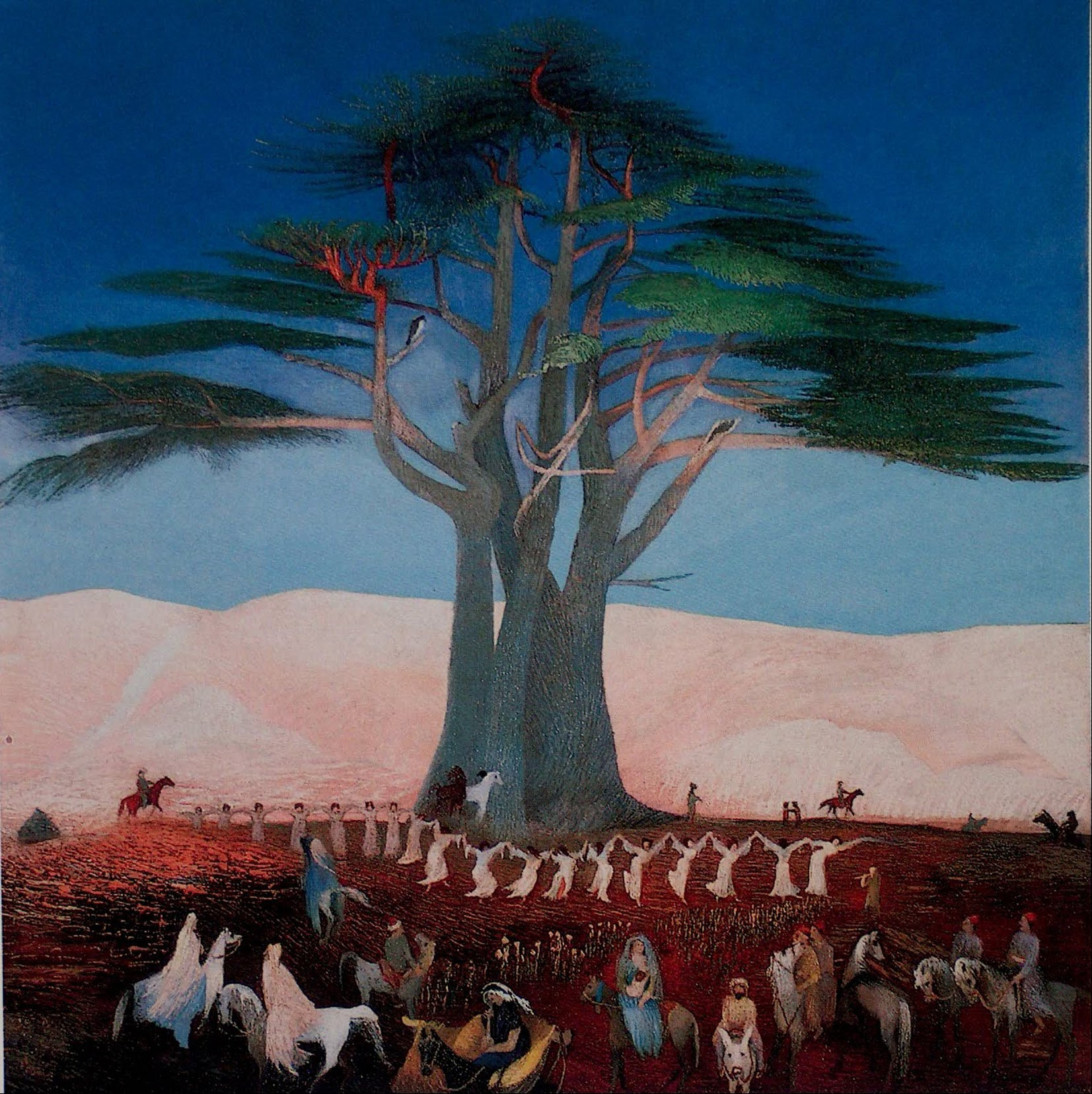
Csontváry Kosztka, Tivadar - Pilgrimage to the Cedars of Lebanon

=== Contemporary art ===
Contemporary art started in Beirut in the early 60s following the Lebanese Civil War, with abstract pioneers like Jean Khalife, Shafik Abboud, Hellen El Khal, Paul Guiragossian and many others that were influenced by the western art. Following the Lebanese Civil War artists began processing their trauma with the use of contemporary art.

Many contemporary artists are currently active, such as Walid Raad, a contemporary media artist currently residing in New York.

Two contemporary art exhibition centers, the Beirut Art Center and the Beirut Exhibition Center (does not exist anymore) in the BIEL area reflect the vibrant Lebanese contemporary art scene. These two centers are intended to host exhibitions and are a must in the world of international as well as local contemporary art. Many art galleries also add to the local art scene, exhibiting the works of artists such as Ayman Baalbaki, Akram Zaatari, Marwan Sahmarani, Nadim Asfar, Lamia Joreige, Jean Marc Nahas, Ricardo Mbarkho, Mansour El-Habre, Anita Toutikian and many others. These galleries are run by gallerists such as Saleh Barakat, Fadi Mogabgab, Nadine Begdache (Galerie Janine Rubeiz), Odile Mazloum (Galerie Alwane).

Located in Foch Street in the Solidere area, FFA Private Bank is home to many temporary exhibitions of contemporary local artists as well as to a permanent display of paintings by Lebanese artists (Sahmarani, Baalbaki, Hanibal Srouji) or foreign artists such as Fabienne Arietti's "Nasdaq". A Jean Dubuffet's huge sculpture can also be seen when visiting the atrium of Bank Audi Plaza, located in a contemporary building designed by Kevin Dash. By strolling through the streets of the city one can find works such as sculptures of Michel Basbous in the Bank of Lebanon street.

Ashkal Alwan, the Lebanese association for plastic arts and a platform for the creation and exchange of artistic practices. It was founded by Christine Tohmé, Marwan Rechmaoui, Rania Tabbara, Mustapha Yamout and Leila Mroueh. Initially, Ashkal Alwan promoted and introduced the work of artists who have been engaged in critical art practices within the context of post-war Lebanon. The Home Works Forum is a multidisciplinary platform that takes place in Beirut, Lebanon about every other year. it has evolved into one of the most vibrant platforms for research and exchange on cultural practices in the region and beyond.

Umam Documentation & Research runs an exhibition space (The Hangar) located at Haret Hreik, in Beirut's Southern suburb with extensive events.

In the field of digital art, the artist Ricardo Mbarkho investigates the transformation of cultural industries into creative industries.

In the field of photography, the Arab Image Foundation has a collection of +4000 photographs from Lebanon and the Middle East. The photographs can be viewed in a research center and various events and publications have been produced in Lebanon and worldwide to promote the foundation.

=== Architecture ===
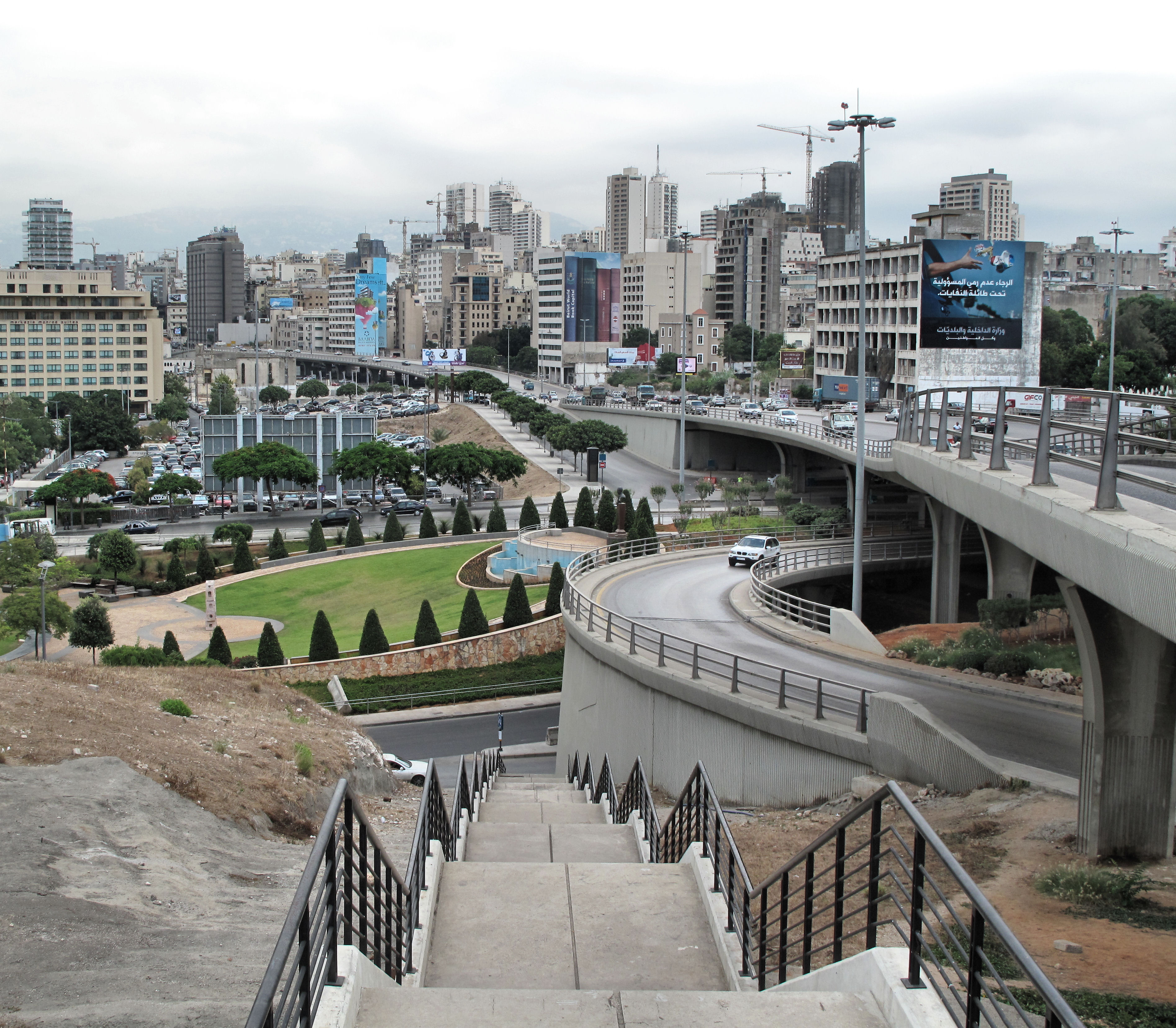
Gibran Khalil Gibran Garden and surroundings in Beirut Central District, Majidiye, Beirut

Architecture in Lebanon includes the legacies of various occupying powers including the Romans, Phoenicians, Ottomans and French, as well as post independence developments.

When the Ottomans exiled Fakhreddine to Tuscany, Italy in 1613, he entered an alliance with the Medicis. Upon his return to Lebanon in 1618, he began modernizing Lebanon. He developed a silk industry, upgraded olive-oil production, and brought with him numerous Italian engineers who began the construction of mansions and civil building throughout the country. The cities of Beirut and Sidon were especially built in the Italianate style.

The Italianate, specifically, Tuscan, influence on architecture in Lebanon dates back to the Renaissance when Fakhreddine, the first Lebanese ruler who truly unified Mount Lebanon with its Mediterranean coast executed an ambitious plan to develop his country.

The influence of these buildings, such as the ones in Deir el Qamar, influenced building in Lebanon for many centuries and continues to the present time. For example, streets like Rue Gouraud continues to have numerous, historic houses with Italianate influence. Buildings like the Nicolas Sursock mansion on Rue Sursock, which is today a major museum, attest to the continuous influence of Italianate architecture in Lebanon.

=== Literature ===
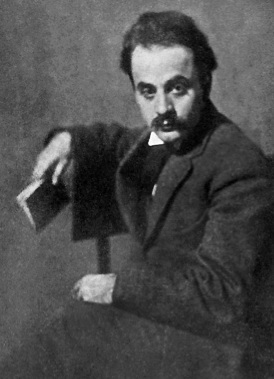
Khalil Gibran (April 1913)

Khalil Gibran (1883–1931), who was born in Bsharri, is particularly known for his book The Prophet (1923), which has been translated into more than twenty different languages. Several contemporary Lebanese writers have also achieved international success; including Elias Khoury, Amin Maalouf, Hanan al-Shaykh, and Georges Schehadé.

=== Poetry ===
There are many well known Lebanese poets that marked the history of poetry. For example, there is Gibran Khalil Gibran who wrote "Love" in 1920, "On Friendship" in 1923 and many more.

== Popular culture ==
=== Music ===
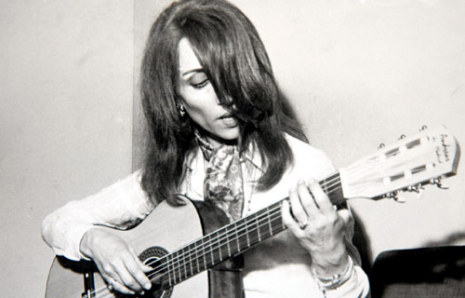
Fairuz playing guitar

Music is famous in Lebanese society. While traditional folk music remains popular in Lebanon, modern music reconciling traditional styles, pop, and fusion are rapidly advancing in popularity. Radio stations feature a variety of genres and languages, including traditional, classical Arabic and Armenian Prominent traditional musicians include Fairuz, an icon during the civil war, Sabah Melhem Barakat, Wadih El Safi, Majida El Roumi, and Najwa Karam who built an international audience for the genre. Marcel Khalife, a musician who blends classical Arab music with modern sounds, boasts immense popularity for his politically charged lyrics. Distinguished pop artists include Nancy Ajram, Haifa Wehbe, Fadl Shaker, Elissa, and Mika.

According to the World Intellectual Property Organization, Lebanon's music industry is growing and could attain leading status in the region. Lebanese performers are celebrated throughout the Arab World, and with the notable exception of Egypt enjoy increasing regional popularity. Rising demand for Arabic music outside Western Asia has provided Lebanese artists with a small but significant global audience. However, widespread piracy continues to inhibit the music industry's growth.

=== Media ===
Lebanon is not only a regional center of media production but also the most liberal and free in the Arab world. According to Press freedom's Reporters Without Borders, "the media have more freedom in Lebanon than in any other Arab country". Despite its small population and geographic size, Lebanon plays an influential role in the production of information in the Arab world and is "at the core of a regional media network with global implications".

After independence, Beirut emerged as the epicenter of publishing in the Arab world, characterized by free and liberal media and literary scenes. Lebanon's press became a huge industry despite the country's small size and has remained a haven for Arabic publishing. The establishment of modern printing presses and sophisticated book distribution channels made Beirut a regional publishing leader, and gave the Lebanese publishers a dominant role in Arab publishing. Lebanon hosts annually two important regional publishing events, the Beirut Book Fair and the Beirut Francophone Book Fair.

Television in Lebanon was introduced in 1959, with the launch of two privately owned stations, CLT and Télé Orient that merged in 1967 into Télé Liban. Lebanon has ten national television channels, with most being affiliated or supported by certain political parties or alliances.

Lebanon was one of the first countries in the Arabic-speaking world to introduce internet. Beirut's newspapers were the first in the region to provide readers with web versions of their newspapers. By 1986, three newspapers from Lebanon were online, Al Anwar, Annahar, and Assafir, and by 2000, more than 200 websites provided news out of Lebanon.

=== Cinema ===
Cinema of Lebanon, according to film critic and historian, Roy Armes, was the only other cinema in the Arabic-speaking region, beside Egypt's, that could amount to a national cinema. Cinema in Lebanon has been in existence since the 1920s, and the country has produced over 500 films, some of which are:

- West Beirut – by Ziad Doueiri, released in 1998, received the Prix François Chalais at the Directors' fortnight of the Cannes Film Festival (1998)
- Mabrouk Again – by Hany Tamba, released in 2000
- The Kite– by Randa Chahal, released in 2003, received many prestigious awards including the Silver Lion, Prix de la paix- Gillo Pontecorvo and Prix de la Lanterne Magique at the Venice Film Festival (2003)
- After Shave – by Hany Tamba, released in 2005, received the 2006 French César Award for best foreign short film
- Bosta – by Philippe Aractingi, released in 2005
- Under the Bombs – by Philippe Aractingi, released in 2006
- Caramel – starring and directed by Nadine Labaki, released in 2007
- Where Do We Go Now? – starring and directed by Nadine Labaki, released in 2011, received the Cadillac People's Choice Award at the Toronto International Film Festival (2011)
- Capernaum – written by Nadine Labaki, Jihad Hojaily and Michelle Keserwany, released in 2018, the film was selected as the Lebanese entry for Best Foreign Language Film at the 91st Academy Awards.

=== Theatre ===
Lebanese theatre has its origin in passion plays. The musical plays of Maroun Naccache from the mid-1800s are considered the birth of modern Arab theatre. Some scholars like Abdulatif Shararah divided theatre in Lebanon into three phases: translations of European plays, Arab nationalism, and realism.

== Cultural relations between Lebanon and Egypt ==
The cultural and historical relations between Lebanon and Egypt are considered unique due to a significant overlap between Lebanese and Egyptian cultures, particularly in the fields of literature, theater, cinema, and journalism. These areas have historically fostered mutual influence and collaboration between the two countries. This cultural exchange was highlighted during the conference Egypt in the Eyes of the Lebanese, held as part of the cultural program Egypt in the Eyes of the World. The event took place at the headquarters of the Egyptian Ministry of Tourism and was attended by the Lebanese Ambassador to Egypt, Madeleine Tabar, along with Ahmed Ghanem, founder of the cultural program, and a number of prominent Lebanese artists.

== Fashion ==
Many Christians and most Muslims who live in the cities wear modern stylish clothes. In the countryside, women sometimes wear traditional colorful skirts and men wear a traditional sherwal (baggy trousers). Dress was historically Ottoman, but remains only as part of the folk culture. Today, almost all Lebanese wear modern clothing.

Famous names in the Lebanese fashion industry include Elie Saab, Zuhair Murad, Darin Hachem, Reem Acra, and Rabih Kayrouz

== Holidays and festivals ==
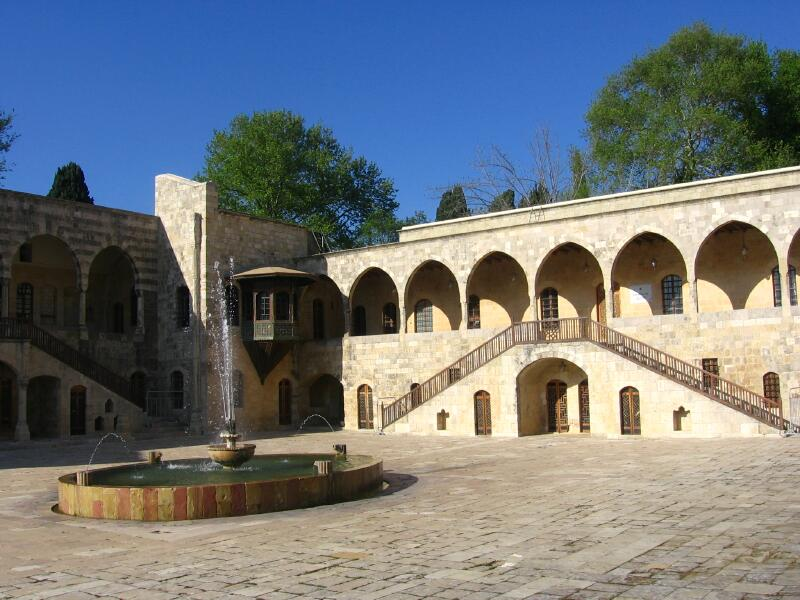
Beiteddine Palace, venue of the Beiteddine Festival

Lebanon celebrates national holidays and both Christian and Muslim holidays.

Christian holidays are celebrated following both the Gregorian Calendar and Julian Calendar. Greek Orthodox, Catholics (Maronite and Melkite), and Protestant Christians follow the Gregorian Calendar and thus celebrate Christmas on 25 December. Armenian Orthodox Christians celebrate Christmas on 6 January, as they follow the Julian Calendar.

Muslim holidays are followed based on the Islamic lunar calendar. Muslim holidays that are celebrated include Eid al-Fitr (the three-day feast at the end of the Ramadan month), Eid al-Adha (The Feast of the Sacrifice) which is celebrated during the annual pilgrimage to Mecca and also celebrates Abraham's willingness to sacrifice his son to God, Mawlid (the Birthday of Muhammad), and Ashura. Lebanon's National Holidays include Workers Day, Independence day, and Martyrs Day.

Music festivals, often hosted at historical sites, are a customary element of Lebanese culture. Among the most famous are Baalbeck International Festival, Byblos International Festival, Beiteddine International Festival, Broumana Festival, Batroun Festival, Dhour Chwer Festival and Tyr Festival. These festivals are promoted by Lebanon's Ministry of Tourism, Lebanon Hosts about 15 Concerts from International Performers Each Year Ranking Number one for Nightlife in the Middle east and 6th Worldwide.

== Cuisine ==
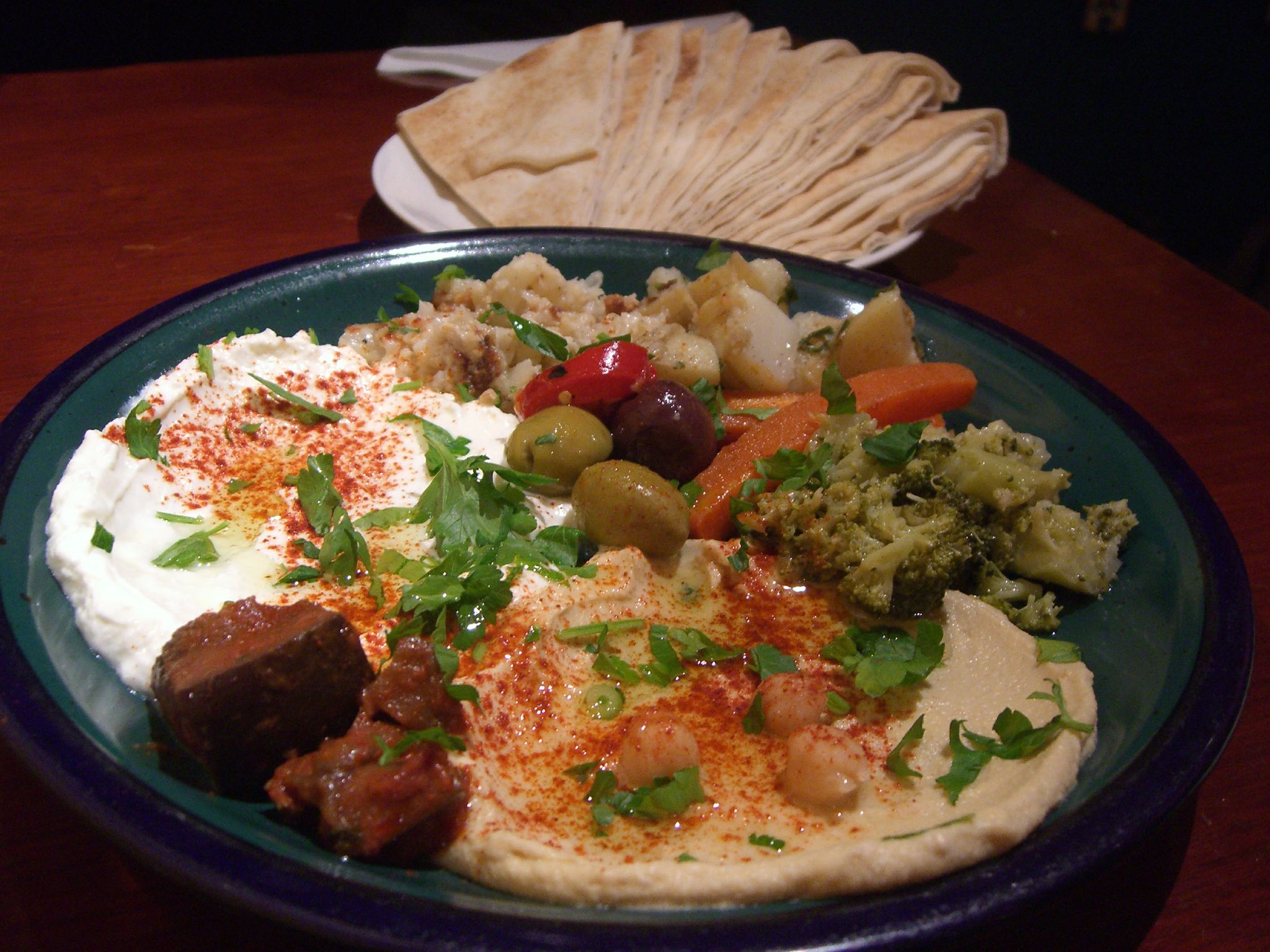
An array of Lebanese cuisine.

Lebanese cuisine is similar to those of many countries in the Eastern Mediterranean, such as Turkey, Greece, and Cyprus.

The Lebanese national dishes are the kibbe, a meat pie made from finely minced lamb and burghul (cracked wheat), and the tabbouleh, a salad made from parsley, tomatoes, and burghul. The national beverage is arak, a strong anise-flavored liquor made from fermented grape juice. It is usually drunk with water and ice, which turns the clear liquid milky-white, and usually accompanies food. Arak is a strong spirit similar to the Greek ouzo and the Turkish raki.

M'Juhdara, a thick stew of onions, rice, and lentils, is sometimes eaten around Lent by people in the Lebanese diaspora.

== Society ==
Lebanese society is similar to certain cultures of the Mediterranean as the country is uniquely diverse religiously . It is often considered as a gateway to Western Asia, Levant and the Arab World.

Notwithstanding the persistence of traditional attitudes regarding the role of women, Lebanese women enjoy equal civil rights and attend institutions of higher education in large numbers (for example, women constituted 41 percent of the student body at the American University of Beirut in 1983). Although women in Lebanon have their own organizations, most exist as subordinate branches of the political parties.

== Sports ==
- In association football, the governing body for Lebanon is the Federation Libanaise de Football (FLDF), which organises the men's, women's, and futsal national teams.
- In basketball, the governing body is the Lebanese Basketball Federation, which is a member of FIBA Asia. The Lebanon national basketball team has qualified three consecutives times to the FIBA World Championship in 2002, 2006, and 2010, and the team is ranked 24th in the world and the women's national team is ranked 61st in the world. Lebanese basketball clubs include Sporting Al Riyadi Beirut and Hekmeh-Sagesse, known as C.S. Sagesse or Sagesse for men and Antranik SC for women.
- The Lebanon national rugby league team qualified and played in the 2000 Rugby League World Cup and 2017 Rugby League World Cup. In the latter, they beat France in their pool match, qualifying for the knockout stages and securing automatic qualification for the 2021 Rugby League World Cup.
- Weightlifting - In the 1972 Summer Olympics, Mohamed Traboulsi won the weightlifting silver medal.
- Winter sports - Lebanon has six ski resorts
- In the summer, skilifts can be used to access hiking trails.
- The Beirut International Marathon is held every fall.
- Rugby union was introduced from France. The Lebanon national rugby union team represents Lebanon in international rugby union, and is governed by the Lebanon Rugby Union.

In 2009, the country hosted the Francophone Games, which took place in the capital, Beirut.

== See also ==
- Arab culture
- Archaeology of Lebanon
- Museums in Lebanon
- Music of Lebanon
