= Bruno Peinado =

French artist

Bruno Peinado (born 1970, in Montpellier) is a French artist who lives and works in Douarnenez, France. He was nominated in 2006 for the prestigious Marcel Duchamp Prize. He also teaches at the European School of Art of Bittany in Quimper, France, with his wife Virginie Barré.

== Overview ==
Through his sculptures, drawings and installations, Peinado attempts to have viewers experience a different outlook on everyday objects, ideas and communication processes. Most recurrent terms in his joyful activism are to re-appropriate and to accumulate.

== Works ==
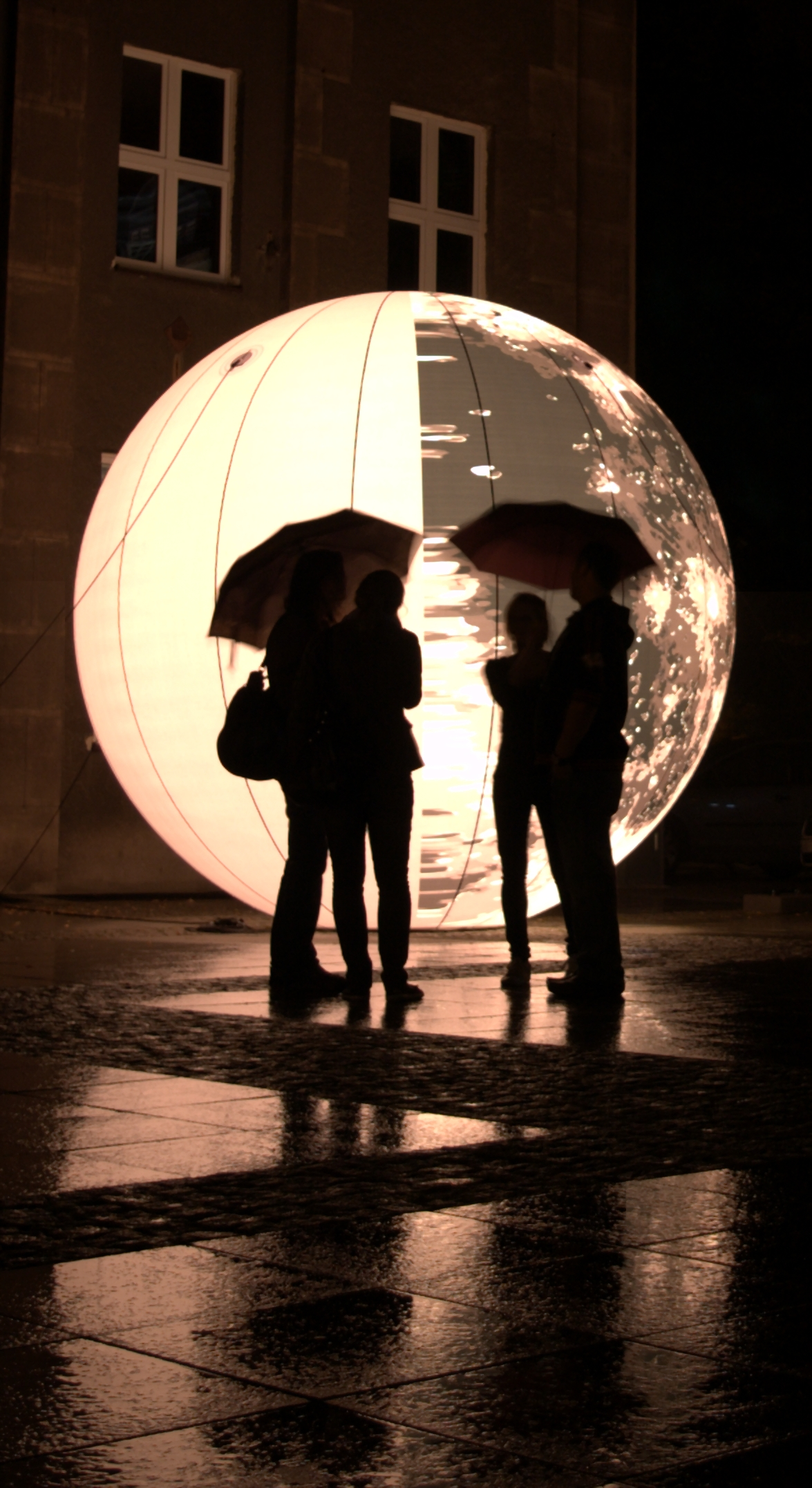
Untitled, Globule Ubiquity Vibrations

Peinado could be described as a disc jockey with his continue use of samplers: smileys, disco balls, surf and skateboards, Tetris or Rubik's Cube blocks and such are recurrent images in his works. His bootleg-session type of proposals also references pop, minimalist and suprematism art. By twisting these now-iconic images through juxtaposition, they become parts of something new, making a kind of complex organic system, a parallel world within the exhibition space, rather like a snow globe shaken by artificial weather in a self-contained landscape. Peinado's multidirectional works comment on each other, much as pop culture does with itself, and even the simplest sculpture or image may hold a wide variety of meanings in his hands. For example, one of his best-known pieces, One Big World, 2001, representing a Michelin Man posing like a black panther, spoke about the employees' firing that the company was heading at the time. On the other hand, by turning the white character into a black one, Peinado acknowledges the real colour of tyres and the fact that international companies would never have an African-originated man representing them.

His crossbreed of ideas and forms describes an internal narrative whose meanings are not always clear to viewers, leaving them free to interpret Peinado's dreamscapes. Working his collage-like assemblages, highly influenced by graphic design copy-paste, the artist underlines the lack of cultural purity in today's interconnected society. Still, even working with visual clichés and slogans, Peinado tries to encapsulate them in such a way that they become his. In pieces like Speedy Revolution (2006), a vegetable-like turning sculpture, or Good Stuff (2004), a structure made of oversized playing cards inspired by Charles and Ray Eames' 1952 piece, and in Native American dreamcatchers like Sadley (2006), Peinado expresses his own personal life experience and the spirit of his time through the process of assemblage, making disparate elements seem to belong together. These pieces can evoke the creative dynamic itself, and the way certain ideas and images morph into personal fixations and social commentary.

As certain memories hit our brains repeatedly, some images of Peinado come back obsessively. The disco ball has taken in his hands the shape of as a skull (Vanityflightcase), a Trojan Horse, 2004, or a turning cement mixer, showing how our brain can manipulate a thought with different and unexpected results. Also, many of his pieces repeatedly appear in different exhibitions over the years, challenging the tyranny of the novelty. The endless loop in which history or a sticky advertising jingle comes back again and again, structuring and feeding our mind, is exposed in his exhibitions.

On a formal level, the hyper-attractive and very finished surfaces of Peinado's works play against the reality that his art is indeed handmade, and offers a kind of pop spin on the artistic process in a world of commercial manufacturing, mass production and the illusion of perfection. In Silence is Sexy (2006), an apparent metallic sphere is actually an inflatable balloon. And in California Custom Game Over (2006), a series of minimal-art inspired parallelepipeds are crushed on one side; while the cracks on the crystal surfaces of Black Flag (2008) create a kind of beauty out of chaos.

== Main solo exhibitions ==
One of Peinado's largest recent exhibitions was Perpetuum Mobile. This installation of installations is like an Alexander Calder mobile for the millennial age, made up of the detritus of a consumerist society. The exhibition at the Palais de Tokyo of Paris in 2004 was actually made of old and new pieces -as said, another characteristic of Peinado's loop strategy- that were placed in an apparent random way throughout the pavilion hall. It had the effect of creating a dialogue about everyday objects (a car, a huge silver-pearl necklace, a black/grey/white rainbow, an advertising billboard, a giant pantone colour guide) and familiar images crafted into hanging black cut-outs: a skateboarder, a tree-shaped car air freshener or a body builder. Giant fans would swoosh the pieces and cast breezes on the visitors.

In 2006, the Galleria continua at San Gimignano, Tuscany in Italy showed his The Eternal Winter.

The title and starting point for Radical Buissonance, FRAC des Pays de la Loire, Carquefou, France (2007), is a neologism, meaning radical bushing-out. In this show, Peinado referred less to everyday objects, relying instead on more symbolic forms and ideas, like a pyramid with its four faces finished on cracked crystal that looked like black marble with white veins. At the peak of the pyramid was a cut-out with the shape of a rhizome -expression of multiplicity (and non-hierarchical interpretation) popularised by French philosopher Gilles Deleuze, which also worked as a weathervane giving a counterpoint to the conceptual verticality of the pyramidal structure. Accompanying this piece the viewer could found a flat mirror ball hanging from the ceiling, a backlit anarchy Ⓐ with the traces fattened to make it look like a clown, L'Auguste (2007); California Game Over (2007), a series of his crushed parallelepipeds, and other sculptures inspired by Memphis' furniture design completed the show. A fog machine clouded the area every now and then, to cloud the space between the objects and to make it more difficult for the viewer to tell the difference between the works.

== Drawings ==
Besides his impressive sculptures and installations, Peinado is also a highly regarded draftsman. He has collected his watercolours illustrations from 1995 to 2005 into a 1,600-page catalogue, Me, myself and I, which playfully assumes the nature of a visual diary.

== Bibliography ==
Les vanités dans l'art contemporai, Edition Flammarion.
Libertad – Igualdad – Fraternidad, Espagne, 2009.
Text(e)s, Editions Loevenbruck, Paris.
VRAOUM! Coédition Fage Editions / La Maison Rouge. Catalogue de l'exposition VRAOUM! -Trésors de la bande-dessinée et art contemporain, La Maison Rouge, Paris, 2009
Kréyol Factory. Editions Gallimard. Catalogue de l'exposition Kréyol Factory, Grande halle de la Villette, Paris, 2009.
Louis Vuitton, Art, Fashion and Architecture. Edition : Ian Luna.
Qu'est-ce que la sculpture aujourd'hui? Beaux Arts Editions.
Dictionnaire International de la Sculpture Moderne & Contemporaine. Editions du Regard.
ToolBox. Editions Entre-Deux. Catalogue de l'exposition ToolBox, Musée des Beaux-Arts de Nantes.
Bruno Peinado – Me, Myself and I. Editions Loevenbruck, coédité par Black Jack éditions.
Esculturismo. Comunidad de Madrid, 2008.
La Force de l'Art, 01. RMN. Catalogue de l'exposition La Force de l'Art, Paris, 2006.
Biennale de Lyon 2007. Co-édition Stéphane Moisdon & Hans Ulrich Obrist. Catalogue de la Biennale d'Art Contemporain de Lyon 2007.
Tactile. Die Gelstaten.
Promenade au zoo. Editions deValence.
Supernova – expérience Pommery #3. BeauxArts magazine.
100 Artistes / Qu'est-ce que l'art contemporain en France? BeauxArts magazine.
Notre Histoire. Paris Musées.
Bang Bang! Fage Editions. Catalogue de l'exposition Bang Bang!, Musée d'Art et d'Industrie de St Etienne.
Le Prix Marcel Duchamp 2006. Centre National d'Art et de Culture Georges Pompidou.
Catalogue du Prix Marcel Duchamp 2006.
Prêts à prêter. Isthme Editions / FRAC PACA.
Art Now. Taschen.
26a Bienal de Sao Paulo. Fundaçao Bienal de São Paulo.
Playlist. Palais de Tokyo.
A arte de Bruno Peinado. Paço das artes, catalogue de l'exposition personnelle de Bruno Peinado au Paço das Artes à São Paulo (Kombi – nacao).
ANTIPURE. Gianni Jetzer et JRP editions, Genève, Switzerland. Catalogue de l'exposition Antipure organisée par Gianni Jetzer à la Ursula Blickle Stiftung.
Propaganda. Espace Paul Ricard.
Original. Galerie Loevenbruck.
Art at the turn of rue de Seine et la rue de l'Echaudé. Galerie Loevenbruck.
