= Georges Rousse =

French artist (born 1947)

- Born: Georges Rousse; 28 July 1947 (age 78); Paris, France

Georges Rousse (born 28 July 1947) is a French photographer, painter, and installation artist. He currently lives in Paris.

== Early life ==
When he was 9 years old, he received a Kodak Brownie camera as a Christmas gift, inspiring his passion for photography. While attending medical school in Nice, he decided to study professional photography and printing techniques. He subsequently opened his own studio dedicated to architectural photography.

== Artwork ==
Rousse converts abandoned or soon-to-be-demolished buildings into visions of color and shape. Since his first exhibition in 1981 at the Galerie de France in Paris, Rousse has continued creating installations and photographs around the globe. His work has been exhibited at the Grand Palais, Hirshhorn Museum, and the National Art Museum of China, among others. In 1988, he received the International Center of Photography Award. In 2008, Georges Rousse succeeded Sol LeWitt as an associate member of the Royal Academy of Science, Letters and Fine Arts of Belgium.

== Museum collections ==
- J. Paul Getty Museum, Los Angeles
- Louvre, Paris
- Solomon R. Guggenheim Museum, New York
- Brooklyn Museum, New York
- Museum of Contemporary Art San Diego, La Jolla, CA
- Musée d'Art Moderne de Paris, Paris
- Mumok, Vienna
- Menil Collection, Houston, TX
- LaSalle Bank Photography Collection, Chicago
- North Carolina Museum of Art, Raleigh, NC
