= Armando Andrade Tudela =

Peruvian artist

Armando Andrade Tudela (born 1975) is a Peruvian artist. He lives and works in Saint-Étienne, France, and Berlin, Germany.

== Life ==
Andrade Tudela was born in born 1975 in Lima, Peru. He studied at the Pontifical Catholic University of Peru in Lima, the Royal College of Art, London, and at the Jan Van Eyck Akademie, Maastricht. He was a founding member of the artist-run space and art collective Espacio La Culpable, Lima.

Andrade has taken part in the 2006 São Paulo Art Biennial, the 2006 Shanghai Biennale and the 2005 Torino Triennale. In previous works, like CAMION (2004), his series of Billboard Photographs (2004–2005) and Fragmentos de Escultura (2005), the artist has recombined existing and imagined forms out of a growing interest in local manifestations of the informal that occur on the precarious boundary between the historic and the new.

== Exhibitions ==
- 2006: solo show, INKA SNOW, an extension of the artist's ongoing research practice into forms of Tropical Modernism.
- 2021: MOMA, presentation of Deformed Pottery
