= Sylvie Fanchon =

French contemporary painter (1953–2023)

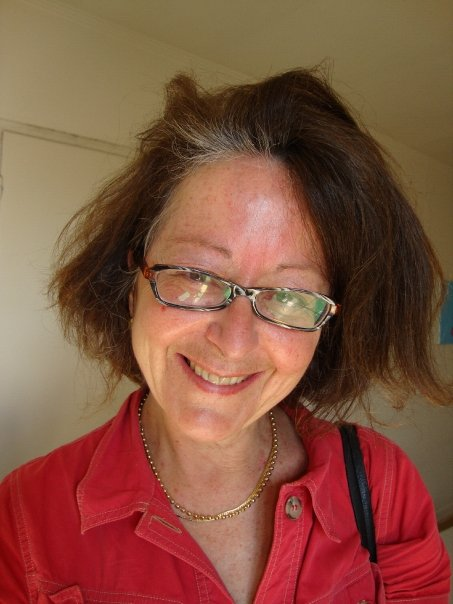
- Fanchon in 2016
- Born: 1953; Nairobi, Colony and Protectorate of Kenya
- Died: 14 April 2023 (aged 70); Paris, France

Sylvie Fanchon (1953 – 14 April 2023) was a French contemporary painter. Born in Nairobi, Kenya, she worked in Paris as a painter until her death on 14 April. Fanchon's career spanned from 1987 until her death. From 2001 to 2019, she was head of the studio at the Beaux-Arts de Paris.

Fanchon's works have been characterized by large, simple geometric forms: squares, rectangles, circles and triangles, evoking and taking inspiration from the legacy of modern painters such as Kazimir Malevich and Piet Mondrian.

With around 50 artworks in public collections, Fanchon's work is present in more than 15 major French institutions including CNAP, MAC VAL, Pompidou Center, M/M Paris, and eight regional contemporary art funds.

Fanchon later described her work by stating:

I don't want technical prowess, I favour the surface, without ever introducing perspective, volume, shadow or light.

== Critical opinion ==
Artforum has positively described the work of Fanchon, stating:

"Since the late ’80s, Fanchon has been creating a sort of heraldry for the era of pictographic communication, a heraldry of indeterminacy and opacity to counter the insipidity and overlegibility of the world."

MAC VAL, a museum which houses much of Fanchon's work, also commented positively on her art. "Sylvie Fanchon paints from elements extracted from reality — furniture diagrams, plans, comic strips or cartoons — to synthesize them to the extreme. Thus, they are inscribed in flat, enigmatic, almost abstract floating forms. The systematic use of the term “Sans titre" (Untitled) to name them demonstrates the desire to leave their interpretation open.

== Works of art ==
Two of Fanchon's paintings, an untitled work dated 2001, using acrylic paint on a canvas, as well as a photography collection of eight images, a collaboration, are housed in the Pompidou Center. The untitled work is described as "based on an imbalance that the quantity and dullness of the blue covering most of the surface tries to compensate for, without suggesting that a superior and utopian harmony could exist beyond our reach".

In the series of Scotch Paintings, Fanchon applies a first color then positions adhesive strips on the surface of the painting before covering the whole thing with black. When removing the tape, the patterns then appear in reserve. These compositions reveal the delicate layering of paint skins, disturbing the relationship between substance and form.

Her last paintings, faithful to her ironic spirit, mocked the injunctions of the medical profession in the face of illness: "Keep your spirits up", "Make plans", "Don't let yourself be discouraged".
