= Michel Moskovtchenko =

French painter and sculptor (1935–2025)

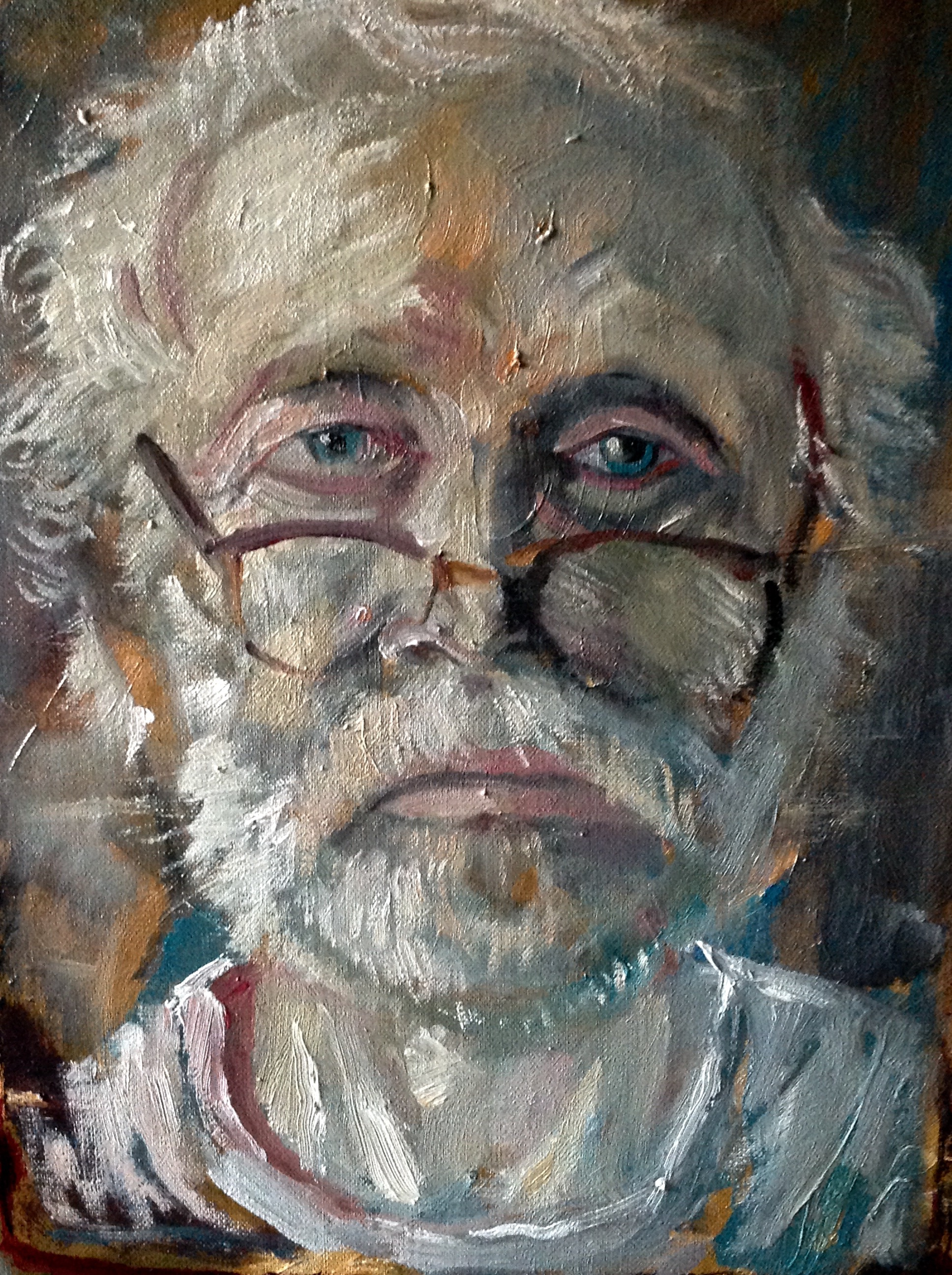
- Self portrait of Moskovtchenko (2017)
- Born: 6 January 1935; Tarare, France
- Died: 21 March 2025 (aged 90); Apt, France
- Education: École nationale supérieure des beaux-arts de Lyon
- Occupations: Painter sculptor illustrator

Michel Moskovtchenko (6 January 1935 – 21 March 2025) was a French painter, sculptor, illustrator, and engraver.

== Biography ==
Born in Tarare on 6 January 1935, Moskovtchenko's father emigrated from Russia in 1920 and his mother was a French woman who had graduated from Springfield College in the United States. While in primary school, he used the Freinet method to engrave his first linocuts. After his studies at the Collège moderne et technique de Tarare, during which he attended the evening classes of Eugène Riboulet, he created his first illustrations at the Établissements G. Corsin in Lyon. At the same time, he took evening classes at the École nationale supérieure des beaux-arts de Lyon under Pierre Pelloux and Antoine Chartres. From 1954 to 1956, he lived in the Netherlands, Germany, and Scandinavia before living in the Luberon until 1960. In 1968, he moved to Gordes with his friend Hans Steffens and established his engraving workshop. In 1975, he founded an intaglio workshop in Grenoble.

Throughout his career, Moskovtchenko applied practices of "artistic geology". He was considered one of the leaders of the New Subjectivity movement by Jean Clair. He received artistic praise from the likes of Hanns Theodor Flemming, Jean-Noël Vuarnet, Jean-Pierre Geay, Jean-Jacques Lévêque, Bruno Marcenac, Michèle Crozet, Gérard Xuriguera, Benezit, and Jean-Jacques Larrant.

Moskovtchenko died in Apt on 21 March 2025, at the age of 90.

== Works ==
=== Paintings ===
- Paysages et arbres autour de Tarare (1949–1953)
- Les Voyages, les musées, la Grand-Place de Bruxelles (1956–1958)
- Les Bateaux : Le Pirée, Schéveningue (1956–1958)
- Les Hameaux en ruine en Provence (1965–1969)
- Les Hurdes en Espagne (1965–1969)
- Série des Murs (1970)
- Les Cèdres dans l'Atlas (1974–1980)
- Le Cirque de Mourèze (1974–1980)
- Les Muriers (1974–1980)
- Les Autoportraits (1978–2017)
- Carrières à Carrare (1982–1986)
- Carrières à Lacoste (1982–1986)
- Venise (1982–1986)
- Hoggar (1986)
- Nus (1988–2017)
- L'atelier (1988–2017)
- Les labours (1988–2017)
- Les Maladrets (1988–2017)
- L'Afrique (1988–2017)
- Paysages de Transylvanie (2006)
- Le Luberon (2006–2008)
- Le chêne bleu (2006–2007)
- Souvenirs de Grèce (2007)

=== Illustrations ===
- Grèce, Saint-Tropez, Bruxelles, La Haye, Banyuls, Collioure (1957–1958)
- Île Barbe, Monts d'Or, Provence (1959)
- Série des Nus (1960)
- Série du Choléra (1976)
- Série des Arbres (1977)
- Dessins aux trois crayons sur papier teinté (1980–2017)
- Série Commémoration du massacre des Vaudois (1990)
- Encre de Chine et gouache sur papier indien froissé (2013–2017)

=== Mixed techniques ===
- Pastel et acrylique sur fragments de gravure (1978–2017)
- Couleur en poudre, encre de Chine et acrylique sur feuilles 63 × 90 cm

=== Engravings ===
- Premiers paysages (1963–1965)
- Études (1964)
- Premiers nus (1963–1965)
- Nus-paysages (1967–1968)
- Autres paysages (1969–1970)
- Les Oliviers (1971)
- Les Murs (1971–1974)
- Paysages et autres gravures (1972–1975)
- Arbres (1975–1978)
- Le chêne à Saby (1979)
- Autres paysages (1978–1992)
- Les Monges et Suite huit petits nus (1993–2000)
- Petits cuivres (1996–1997)
- Nouveaux paysages (1998–2006)

=== Sculptures ===
- Première Baba (1976)
- Les sphinx (1981)
- Les Babas destroyes (1985)
- Les pleureuses (1995)
- Sainte Sarah (1995)
- La pétanqueuse (1999)
- Sous la douche (1999)
- Hommage à Donatello (2008)
- David, l'enfant soldat (2010)
- La migrante (2015)

=== Intaglio ===
- Album du Lubéron (1966)
- Les nus paysage (1974)
- Les carrières de Lacoste – Hommage à Piranèse (1979)
- Pins Sylvestre (1994)
- Ravins érotiques (2001)

== Awards ==
- Prix de gravure de la ville de Toulon (1978)
