= Raymonde Arcier =

French artist and feminist activist (1939–2026)

- Born: 13 November 1939; Bellac, France
- Died: 7 May 2026 (aged 86)
- Education: Paris 8 University
- Occupations: Artist, activist

Raymonde Arcier (French: [ʁɛmˈɔ̃d aʁsjˈe]; 13 November 1939 – 7 May 2026) was a French artist and feminist activist.

== Life and career ==
Born in Bellac on 13 November 1939, Arcier grew up in a modest family and worked in an office while pursuing sociology studies at Paris 8 University. A self-taught artist, she joined the feminist movement, she created oversized versions of shopping bags, floor cloths, and other such items to underscore the significance of the tasks they represented. She also created knitted works using metal wires and rarely exhibited in public spaces, preferring to only show her works in feminist circles. She frequently employed humor, notably in her work Au nom du Père, which depicted a monumental, three-meter-tall woman carrying groceries and a child. In the 1970s, she had the privilege of exhibiting in a studio led by Hessie alongside the likes of Dorothée Selz and Caroline Lee. She was a key figure in the feminist art movement and concentrated much of her work on embroidery, sewing, weaving, and knitting. In 1971, she participated in the publication, writing, and sale of the newspaper Le torchon brûle. In 2017, she participated in a group exhibition at La Maison Rouge in Paris. In 2018, her work Au nom du père was acquired by the Centre Pompidou.

Arcier died on 7 May 2026, at the age of 86.
