= Ricardo Mbarkho =

Lebanese artist and researcher

- Mbarkho in 2011
- Born: Beirut, Lebanon
- Education: Institut supérieur des beaux‑arts (Beirut); Beaux-Arts de Paris (Paris); École supérieure d’études cinématographiques (Paris); Carnegie Mellon University (Exchange)
- Known for: Creative industries, Research-Creation, Video art, New media art
- Movement: Socioeconomic art, Invisual art
- Awards: Lebanese Ministry of Culture Prize for Contemporary Arts (2010)
- Website: www.ricardombarkho.com

Ricardo Mbarkho is a Lebanese artist, researcher, and assistant professor. He has produced video and digital arts. Mbarkho's current artwork remains exclusively what he calls Socioeconomic Art practices. His practice spans two decades of exhibitions, publications and academic research, involving experimental market art in the Middle East and worldwide. He lives and works in Beirut.

In his digital images, as well as in his time-based work, he investigates multiple questions related to interactivity, language, communication, cultural industries, history of art as well as the visual representation within the sociopolitical sphere.

== Early life and education ==
In 1992 he enrolled at the Institut supérieur des beaux‑arts in Beirut, completing foundational studies in visual arts. Seeking broader theoretical perspectives, he moved to Paris in 1996 where he simultaneously attended the École nationale supérieure des Beaux‑Arts and the École supérieure d’études cinématographiques (ESEC), earning a DNSAP in Visual Arts and a diploma in Cinematography. While at ENSBA, he participated in an LVMH‑funded exchange at Carnegie Mellon University's College of Fine Arts in Pittsburgh (1998–1999), where early experiments in network art and algorithmic image processing laid the groundwork for his subsequent digital works.

Mbarkho completed doctoral‑level research in Information and Communication Sciences at Université Sorbonne Paris Nord, focusing on the interaction between media arts and cultural industries.

== Academic career ==
Since 2002 Mbarkho has taught at the Lebanese Academy of Fine Arts (ALBA), where he is Assistant Professor and Head of the Research Department. He has designed interdisciplinary curricula that bridge theory, critical studies and creative practice, and has supervised graduate theses on cultural and creative industries.

His essays have appeared in peer‑reviewed journals such as Leonardo published by MIT Press, SAGE and Cambridge Scholars.

== Invisual Art genre ==
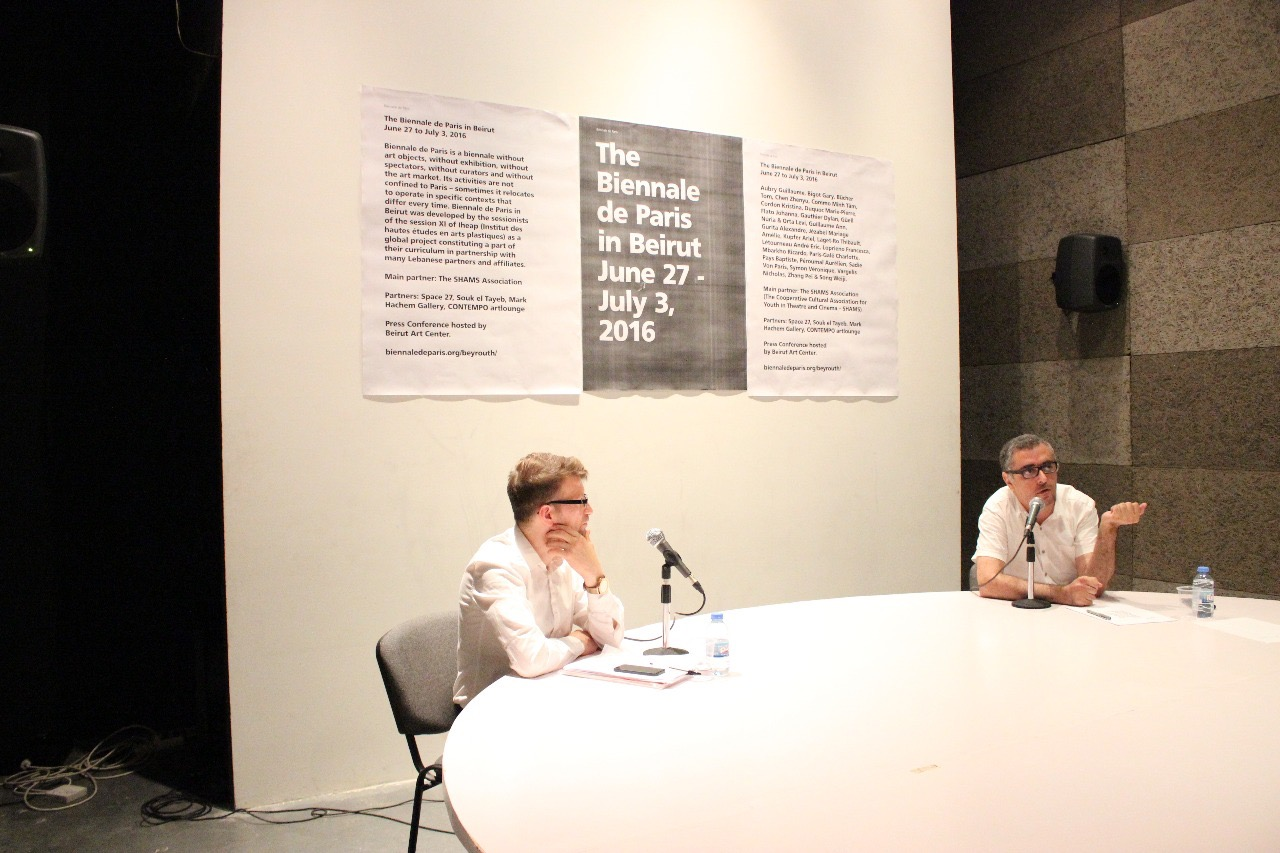
Ricardo Mbarkho (right) and Alexandre Gurita (left) during a press conference at the Beirut Art Center, July 3, 2015

In 1998, Mbarkho met French artist Alexandre Gurita, whose Biennale de Paris had embraced anti‑spectacular, de‑institutionalised art forms. Together they articulated Invisual Art, a mode of artistic practice that abandons both material and immaterial objects in favour of information, situation and protocol. Rather than producing works to be seen, the artist designs conditions, mindsets or socio‑economic models that operate independently of a viewing public. Gurita provided the institutional framework through the Biennale de Paris, the Revue de Paris, and the Ecole nationale d'art de Paris (ENDA), while Mbarkho developed theoretical and practical methodologies through published texts, art projects such as Tabbouleh Day and the Bible by ChatGPT, and academic framework with the Atelier of research and creation in invisual art, at the Lebanese Academy of Fine Arts - University of Balamand in Beirut.

== Publications and research ==
- Mbarkho, Ricardo (2021). « What Is at Stake in the Interaction between Media Arts and Cultural Industries in Lebanon », Leonardo, Journal of the International Society for the Arts, Sciences and Technology, Volume 54, Number 6, The MIT Press. 714–716. doi: https://doi.org/10.1162/leon_a_02098

== Awards ==
2010 – Prize of the Lebanese Ministry of Culture for Contemporary Arts, Visual Art Forum, Beirut.

== Critical reception ==
Critics have linked Mbarkho's invisual socio-economic and dematerialised strategies as rooted in informational aesthetics, post-conceptual art, and resistance concepts of Duchamp, Deleuze and Foucault, as well as "the institutional critique of Hans Haacke," noting his distinct re‑working of Lebanese cultural and religious symbols.

== See also ==
- Art invisuel (French Wikipedia)
- Alexandre Gurita (French Wikipedia)
