= Martine Aballéa =

French-American artist (born 1950)

- Born: 11 August 1950 (age 75); New York, United States
- Known for: Visual art, photography, installation, texts

Martine Aballéa (born August 11, 1950) is a French-American artist born in 1950.

== Early life ==
Aballéa was born on August 11, 1950, in New York. She moved to France in 1973. She followed a scientific and philosophical training before starting to write, take photographs and making installations and art performances.

== Work ==
Aballéa finds her sources of inspiration as much in literature as in the material world. Her work is a mix of concept art, photography, writing and installation. Aballéa's projects are about experience, dreams and poetic encounter. Aballéa had solo exhibitions in museums and galleries such as Art in General (New York), the Musée d'art moderne de Paris, the Museum in Progress (Vienna), the LaM (Villeneuve d'Ascq), the Galerie Edouard-Manet (Gennevilliers), the Centre Pompidou and the gallery Art Concept (Paris).

== Collections ==
Her work is among others in the collections of the Museum of Fine Arts Houston, the Musée d'Art Moderne de Paris, the Centre Pompidou and the Fonds national d'art contemporain.

== Bibliography ==
- Horizons incertains, Les Sables d'Olonne: Musée de l'Abbaye Sainte-Croix, 2010, ISBN 978-2-913981-42-3
- Martine Aballéa : roman partiel, Paris: Semiose, 2009, ISBN 978-2-915199-26-0
- Hôtel passager, Paris : Editions des musées de la ville de Paris, 1999, ISBN 978-2-87900-485-3
- Sous le soleil, Nice: Villa Arson, 1995, ISBN 978-2-905075-74-1
- Prisonnière du sommeil, Paris: Flammarion, 1987, ISBN 978-2-080660008
- Element rage, Joinville le Pont: Presses de la Société B.G.B., 1979
