= 1953 =

1953 in various calendars
- Gregorian calendar: 1953; MCMLIII
- Ab urbe condita: 2706
- Armenian calendar: 1402; ԹՎ ՌՆԲ
- Assyrian calendar: 6703
- Baháʼí calendar: 109–110
- Balinese saka calendar: 1874–1875
- Bengali calendar: 1359–1360
- Berber calendar: 2903
- British Regnal year: 1 Eliz. 2 – 2 Eliz. 2
- Buddhist calendar: 2497
- Burmese calendar: 1315
- Byzantine calendar: 7461–7462
- Chinese calendar: 壬辰年 (Water Dragon); 4650 or 4443 — to — 癸巳年 (Water Snake); 4651 or 4444
- Coptic calendar: 1669–1670
- Discordian calendar: 3119
- Ethiopian calendar: 1945–1946
- Hebrew calendar: 5713–5714
- Hindu calendars
- Vikram Samvat: 2009–2010
- Shaka Samvat: 1874–1875
- Kali Yuga: 5053–5054
- Holocene calendar: 11953
- Igbo calendar: 953–954
- Iranian calendar: 1331–1332
- Islamic calendar: 1372–1373
- Japanese calendar: Shōwa 28 (昭和２８年)
- Javanese calendar: 1884–1885
- Juche calendar: 42
- Julian calendar: Gregorian minus 13 days
- Korean calendar: 4286
- Minguo calendar: ROC 42 民國42年
- Nanakshahi calendar: 485
- Thai solar calendar: 2496
- Tibetan calendar: ཆུ་ཕོ་འབྲུག་ལོ་ (male Water-Dragon); 2079 or 1698 or 926 — to — ཆུ་མོ་སྦྲུལ་ལོ་ (female Water-Snake); 2080 or 1699 or 927

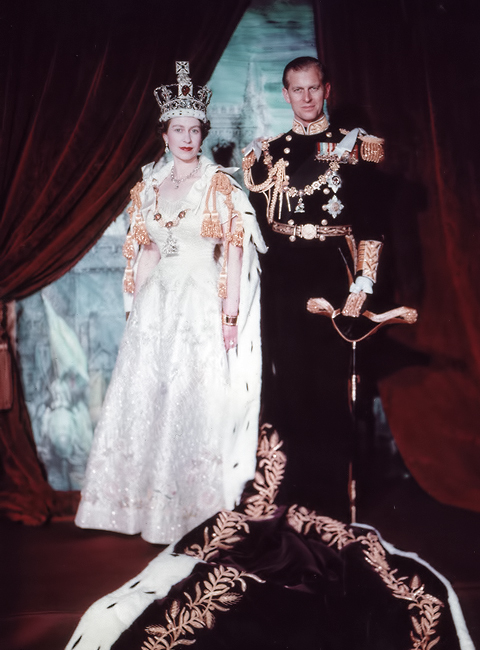
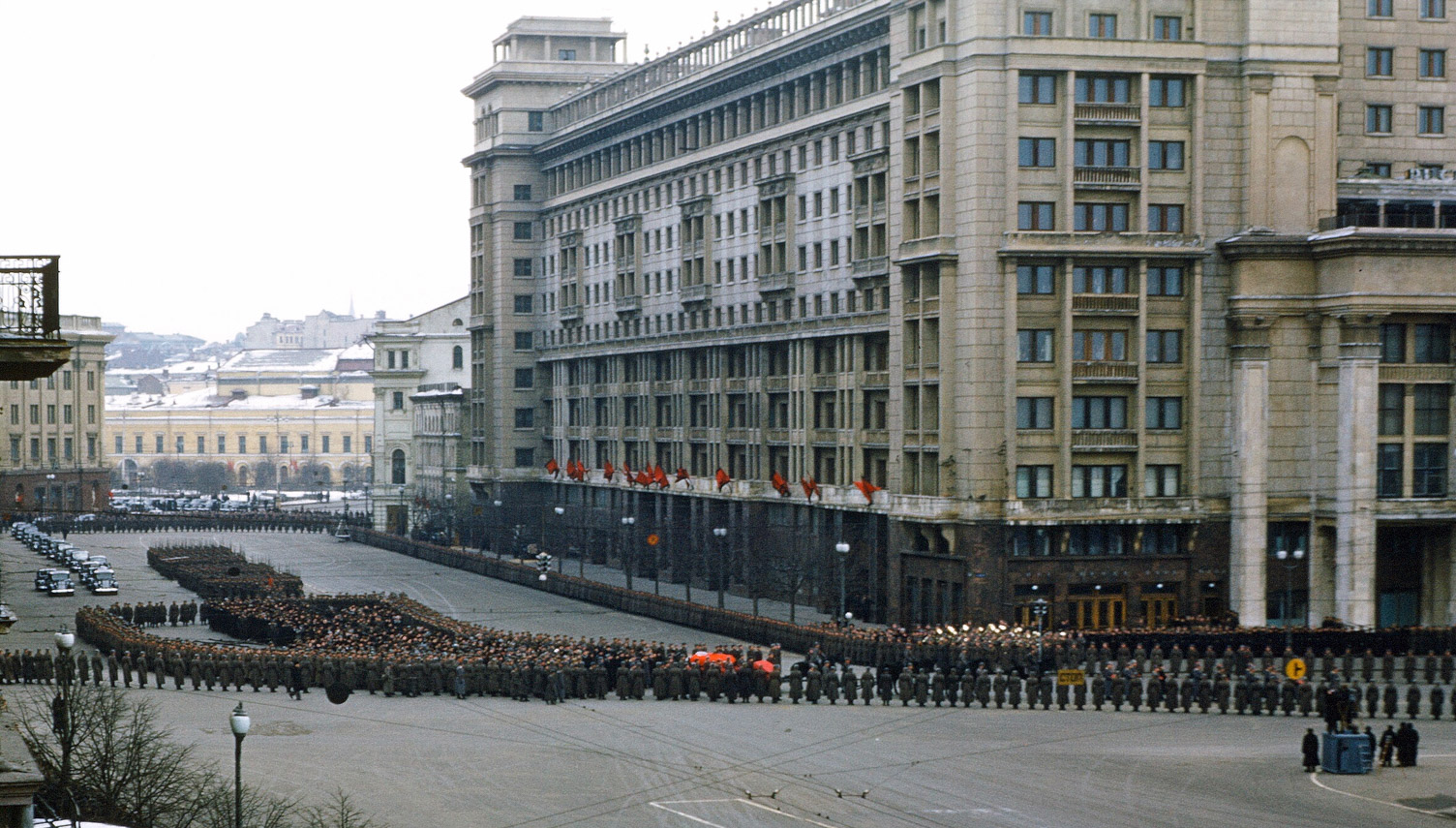
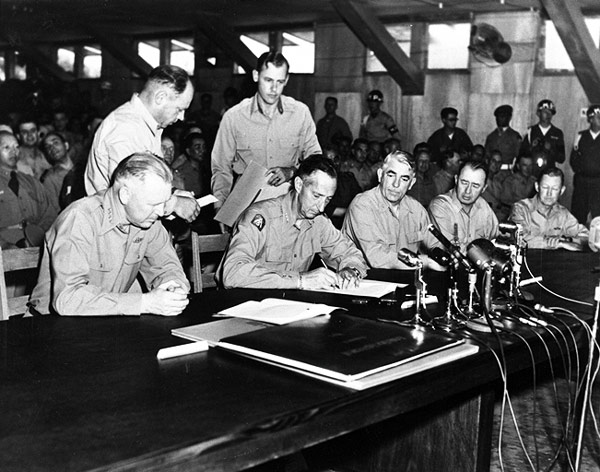
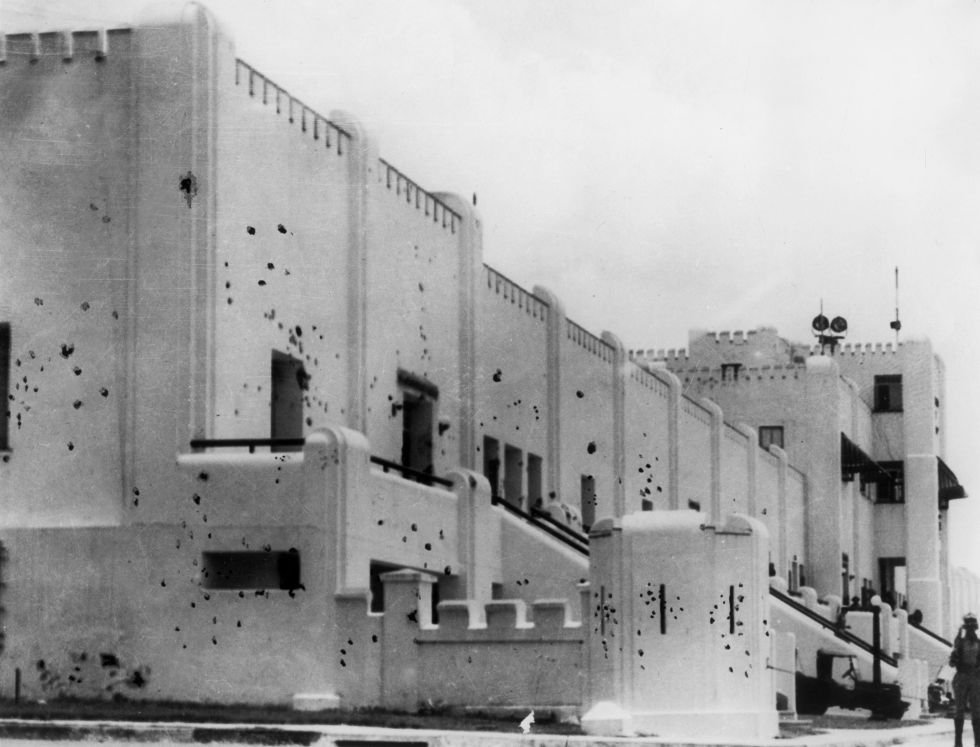
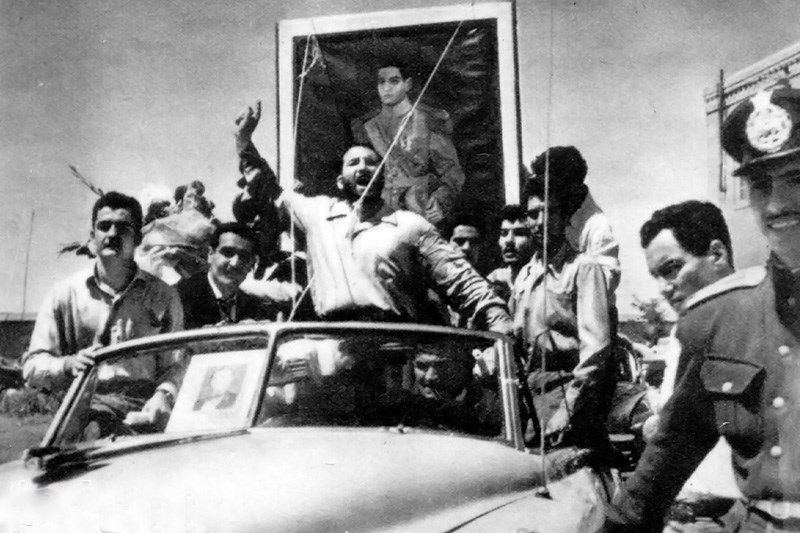
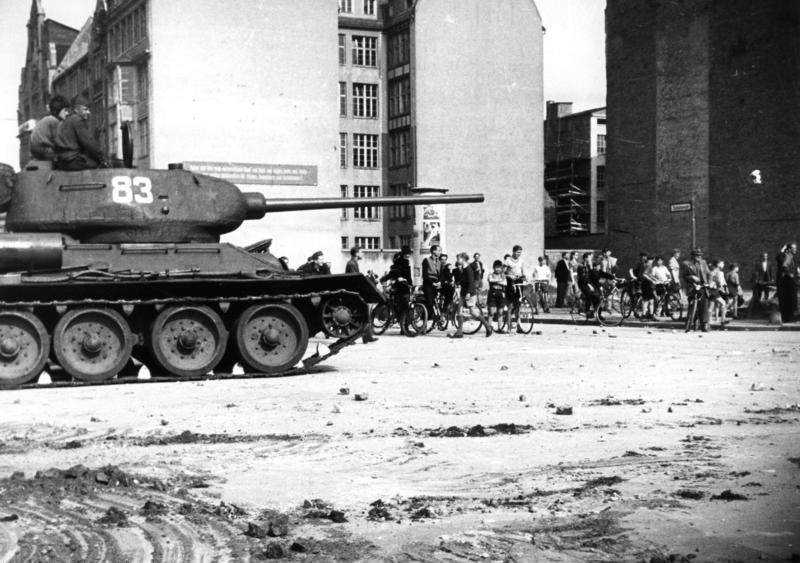
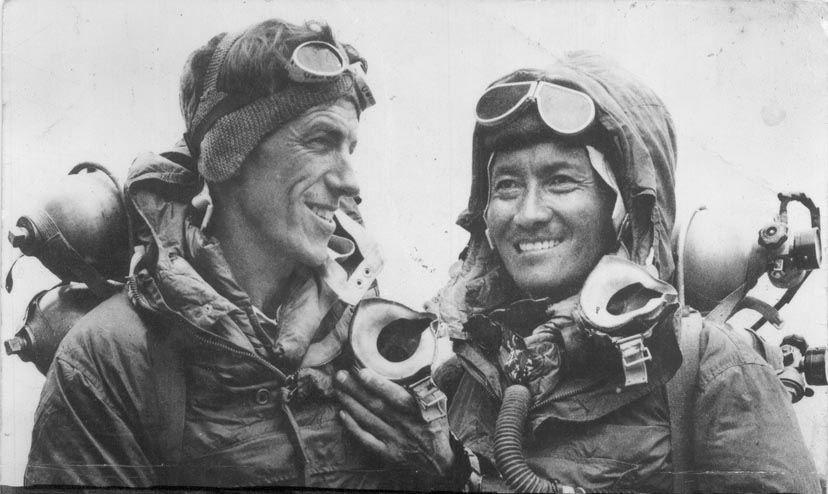
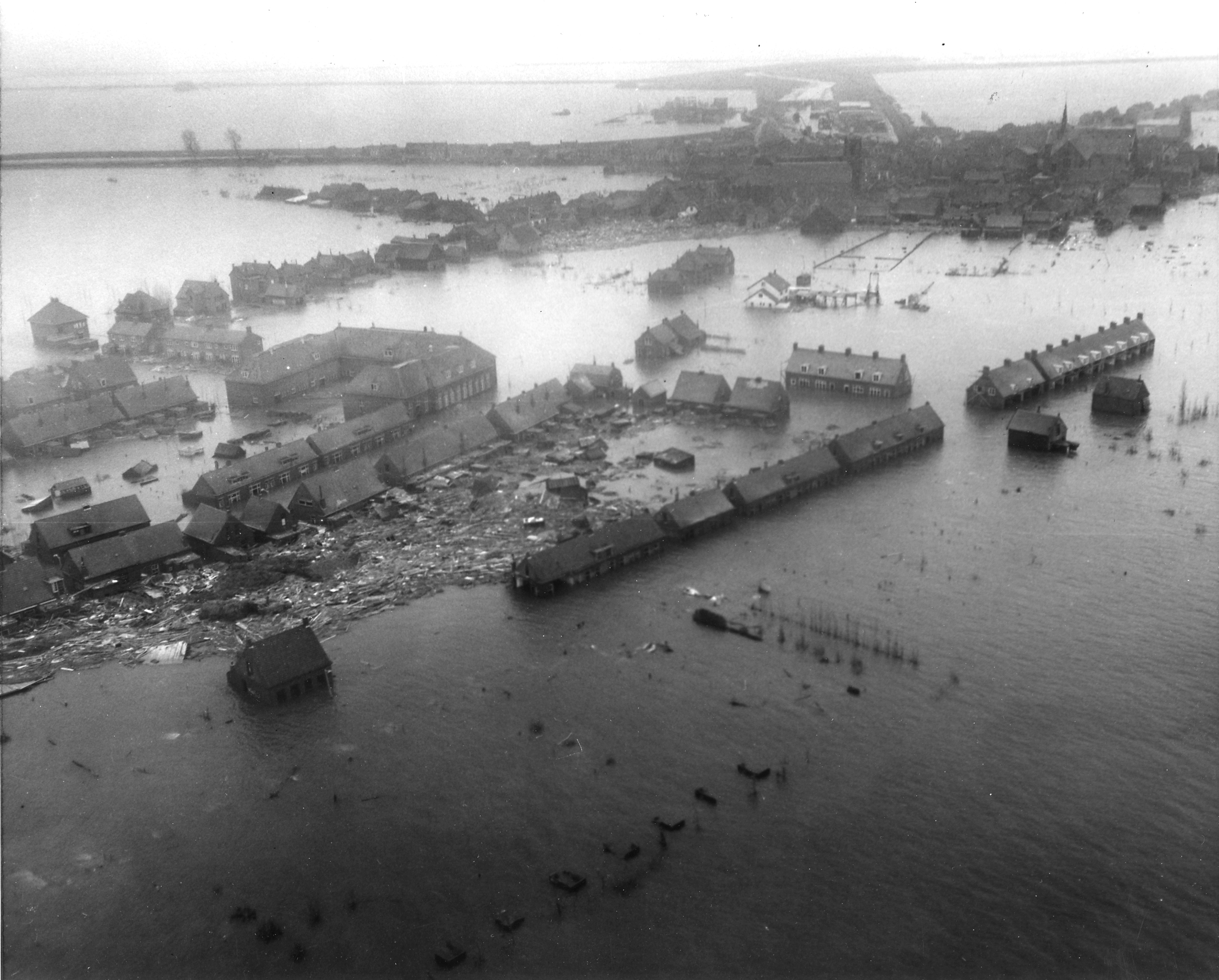
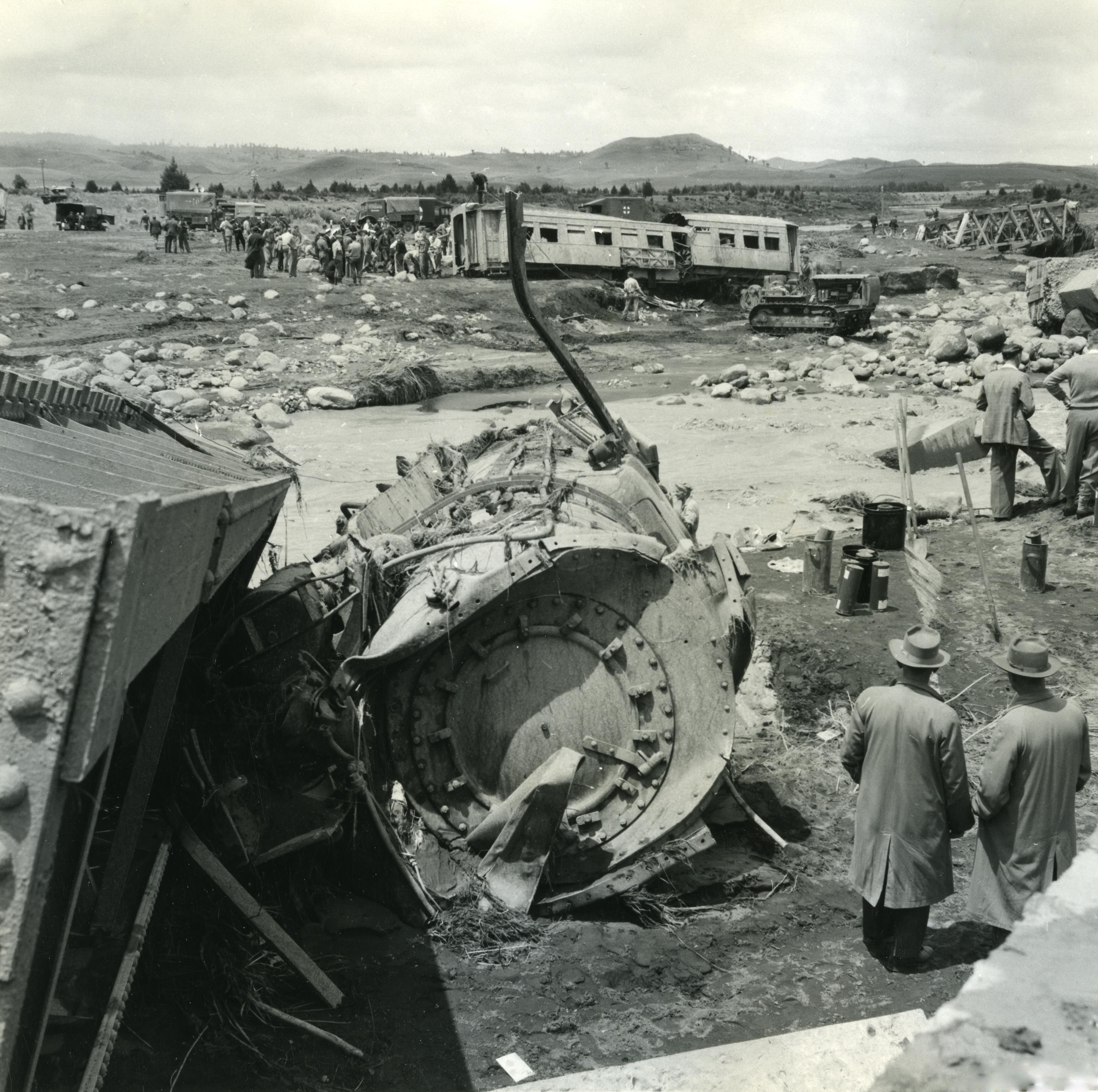
From top to bottom, left to right:
- The coronation of Elizabeth II is held in the United Kingdom;
- Joseph Stalin dies, ending an era of Soviet rule;
- The Korean Armistice Agreement ends the Korean War;
- The Attack on the Moncada Barracks launches the Cuban Revolution;
- The 1953 Iranian coup d'état topples Mohammad Mosaddegh;
- The East German uprising of 1953 is suppressed;
- The 1953 British Mount Everest expedition achieves the first ascent;
- The North Sea flood of 1953 devastates Western Europe;
- The Tangiwai disaster kills 151 in New Zealand.

1953 (MCMLIII) was a common year starting on Thursday of the Gregorian calendar, the 1953rd year of the Common Era (CE) and Anno Domini (AD) designations, the 953rd year of the 2nd millennium, the 53rd year of the 20th century, and the 4th year of the 1950s decade.

== Events ==
=== January ===
- January 6 – The Asian Socialist Conference opens in Rangoon, Burma.
- January 12 – Estonian émigrés found a government-in-exile in Oslo.
- January 13
  - At a magistrate's Court in West Virginia, 47-year-old Donzel McCray "turned himself into a "human bomb" with sticks of dynamite strapped to his waist. (Note: also reported as "Don" or "McGray".) He killed himself and injured his ex-wife and her lawyer.
- January 14
  - Marshal Josip Broz Tito is chosen President of Yugoslavia.
  - The CIA-sponsored Robertson Panel first meets to discuss the UFO phenomenon.
- January 15
  - Georg Dertinger, foreign minister of East Germany, is arrested for spying.
  - British security forces in West Germany arrest 7 members of the Naumann Circle, a clandestine Neo-Nazi organization.
- January 19 – 71.1% of all television sets in the United States are tuned into I Love Lucy, to watch Lucy give birth to Little Ricky, which is more people than those who tune into Dwight Eisenhower's inauguration the next day.
- January 24
  - Mau Mau Uprising: Rebels in Kenya kill the Ruck family (father, mother, and six-year-old son).
  - Leader of East Germany Walter Ulbricht announces that agriculture will be collectivized in East Germany.
- January 31–February 1 – The North Sea flood of 1953 kills 1,836 people in the southwestern Netherlands (especially Zeeland), 307 in the United Kingdom, and several hundred at sea, including 133 on the ferry MV Princess Victoria in the Irish Sea.

=== February ===
- February 1 – The surge of the North Sea flood continues from the previous day.
- February 3 – Batepá massacre: Hundreds of native creoles, known as forros, are massacred in São Tomé, by the colonial administration and Portuguese landowners.
- February 11
  - United States President Dwight D. Eisenhower refuses a clemency appeal for Ethel and Julius Rosenberg.
  - The Soviet Union breaks diplomatic relations with Israel, after a bomb explodes at the Soviet Embassy, in reaction to the 'Doctors' plot'.
- February 12 – The Nordic Council is inaugurated.
- February 13 – Transsexual Christine Jorgensen returns to New York after successful sex reassignment surgery in Denmark.
- February 19 – Georgia approves the first literature censorship board in the United States.
- February 28
  - James Watson and Francis Crick of Britain's University of Cambridge announce their discovery of the structure of the DNA molecule.
  - Greece, Turkey, and Yugoslavia sign the Balkan Pact.

=== March ===
- March 1
  - Joseph Stalin suffers a stroke, after an all-night dinner with Soviet Union interior minister Lavrentiy Beria and future premiers Georgy Malenkov, Nikolai Bulganin, and Nikita Khrushchev. The stroke paralyzes the right side of his body and renders him unconscious until his death on March 5.
  - Bernard Freyberg, 1st Baron Freyberg is made deputy constable and lieutenant governor of Windsor Castle.
- March 6 – Georgy Malenkov succeeds Joseph Stalin, as Premier and First Secretary of the Communist Party of the Soviet Union.
- March 8 – The Thieves World, which has been transformed into the Russian mafia, are freed from prisons by the Malenkov regime, ending the Bitch Wars.
- March 13 – The United Nations Security Council nominates Dag Hammarskjöld from Sweden as United Nations Secretary General.
- March 17 – The first nuclear test of Operation Upshot–Knothole is conducted in Nevada, with 1,620 spectators at 3.4 km (2.1 mi).
- March 18 – The Yenice–Gönen earthquake affects western Turkey, with a maximum Mercalli intensity of IX (violent), causing at least 1,070 deaths, and $3.57 million in damage.
- March 19 – The 25th Academy Awards Ceremony is held (the first one broadcast on television).
- March 25–26 – Lari Massacre in Kenya: Mau Mau rebels kill up to 150 Kikuyu natives.
- March 26 – Jonas Salk announces his polio vaccine.
- March 29 – A fire at the Littlefield Nursing Home in Largo, Florida, kills 33 persons, including singer-songwriter Arthur Fields.

=== April ===
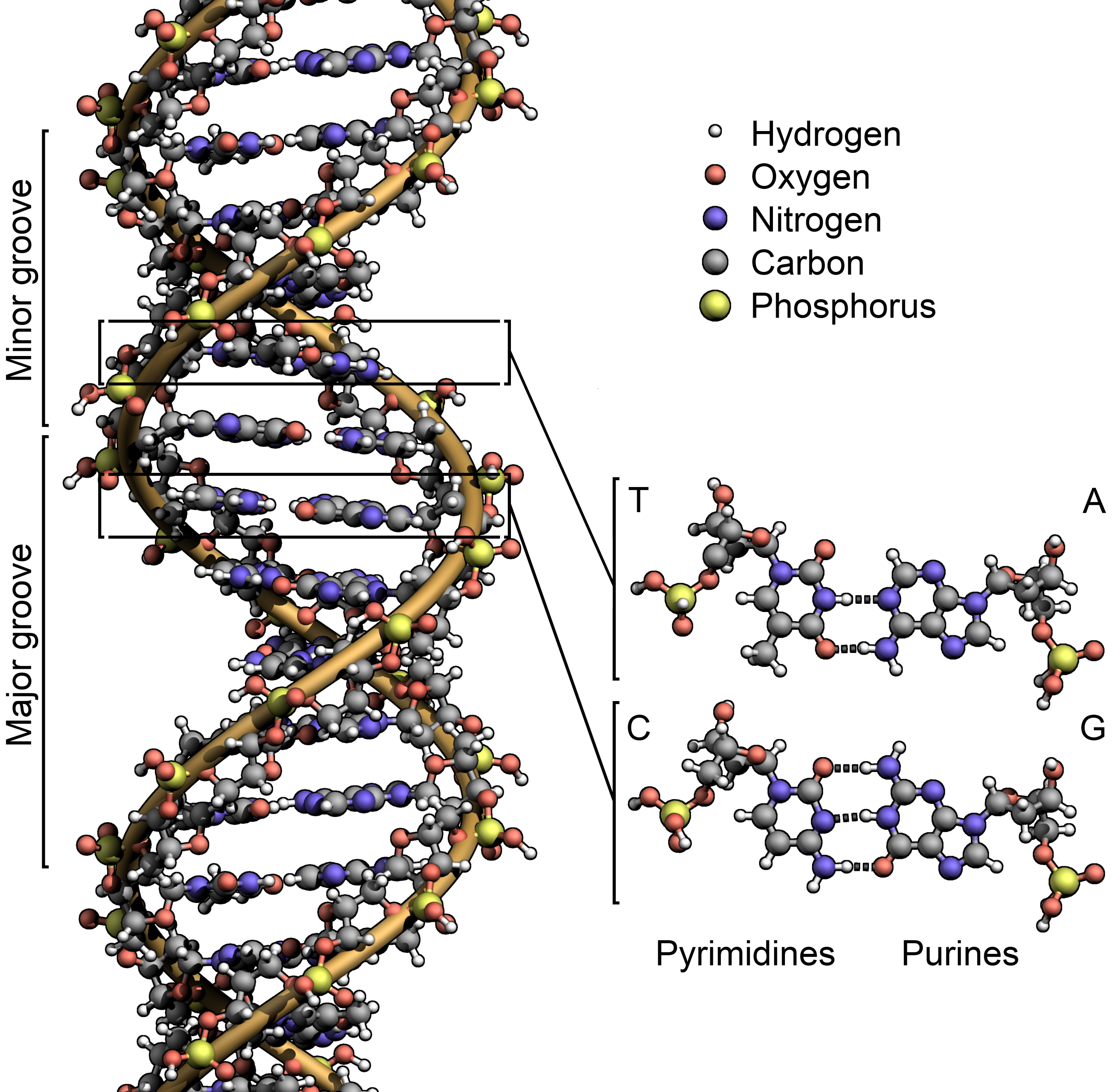
April 25: DNA double helix described.

- April 7 – Dag Hammarskjöld is elected Secretary-General of the United Nations.
- April 8 – Jomo Kenyatta is sentenced to 7 years in prison for the alleged organization of the Mau Mau Uprising in the British Kenya Colony.
- April 16
  - President Eisenhower delivers his "Chance for Peace" speech, to the National Association of Newspaper Editors.
  - The Habar Corporation's building in Chicago, United States, catches fire, killing 35 employees.
- April 25 – Francis Crick and James Watson publish "Molecular Structure of Nucleic Acids: A Structure for Deoxyribose Nucleic Acid", their description of the double helix structure of DNA.

=== May ===
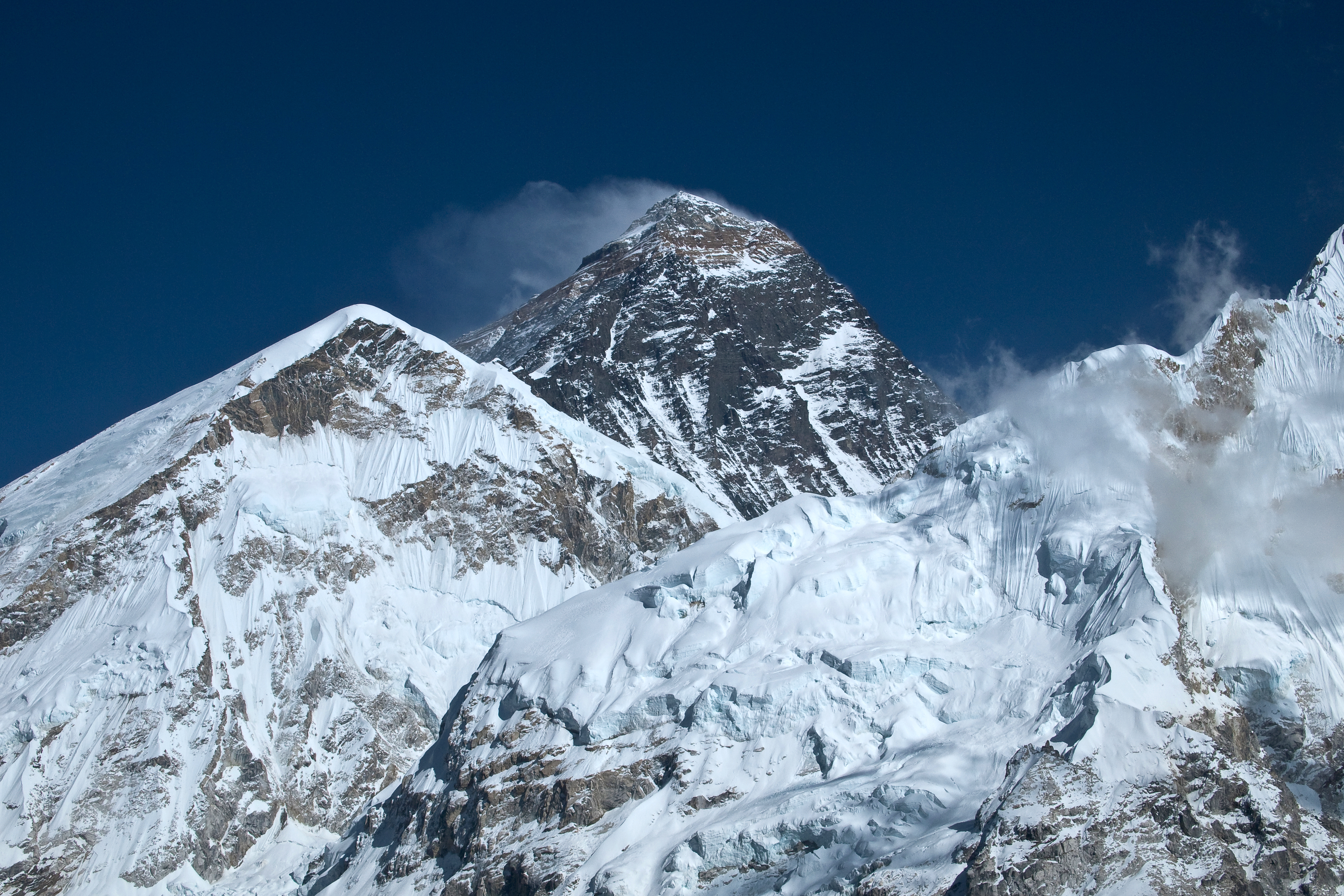
May 29: Mount Everest conquered.

- May 2 – Hussein is crowned King of Jordan.
- May 5 – Aldous Huxley first tries the psychedelic hallucinogen mescaline, inspiring his book The Doors of Perception.
- May 9
  - France agrees to the provisional independence of Cambodia, with King Norodom Sihanouk.
  - Australian Senate election, 1953: The Liberal/Country Coalition Government, led by Prime Minister Robert Menzies, holds their Senate majority, despite gains made by the Labor Party, led by H. V. Evatt. This is the first occasion where a Senate election is held without an accompanying House of Representatives election.
- May 11 – Waco tornado outbreak: An F5 tornado hits in the downtown section of Waco, Texas, killing 114.
- May 15 – The Standards And Recommended Practices (SARPS) for Aeronautical Information Service (AIS) are adopted by the ICAO Council. These SARPS are in Annex 15 to the Chicago Convention, and May 15 is celebrated by the AIS community as "World AIS Day".
- May 18 – At Rogers Dry Lake, Californian Jackie Cochran becomes the first woman to exceed Mach 1, in a North American F-86 Sabre at 652.337 mph (566.865 kn; 1,049.835 km/h).
- May 20–21 – A tornado outbreak tears through Port Huron, Michigan and Sarnia, Ontario, leaving eight people dead and 123 people injured.
- May 25 – Nuclear testing: At the Nevada Test Site, the United States conducts its only nuclear artillery test: Upshot-Knothole Grable.
- May 29 – 1953 British Mount Everest expedition: Sir Edmund Hillary from New Zealand and Tenzing Norgay from Nepal become the first men to reach the summit of Mount Everest.

=== June ===
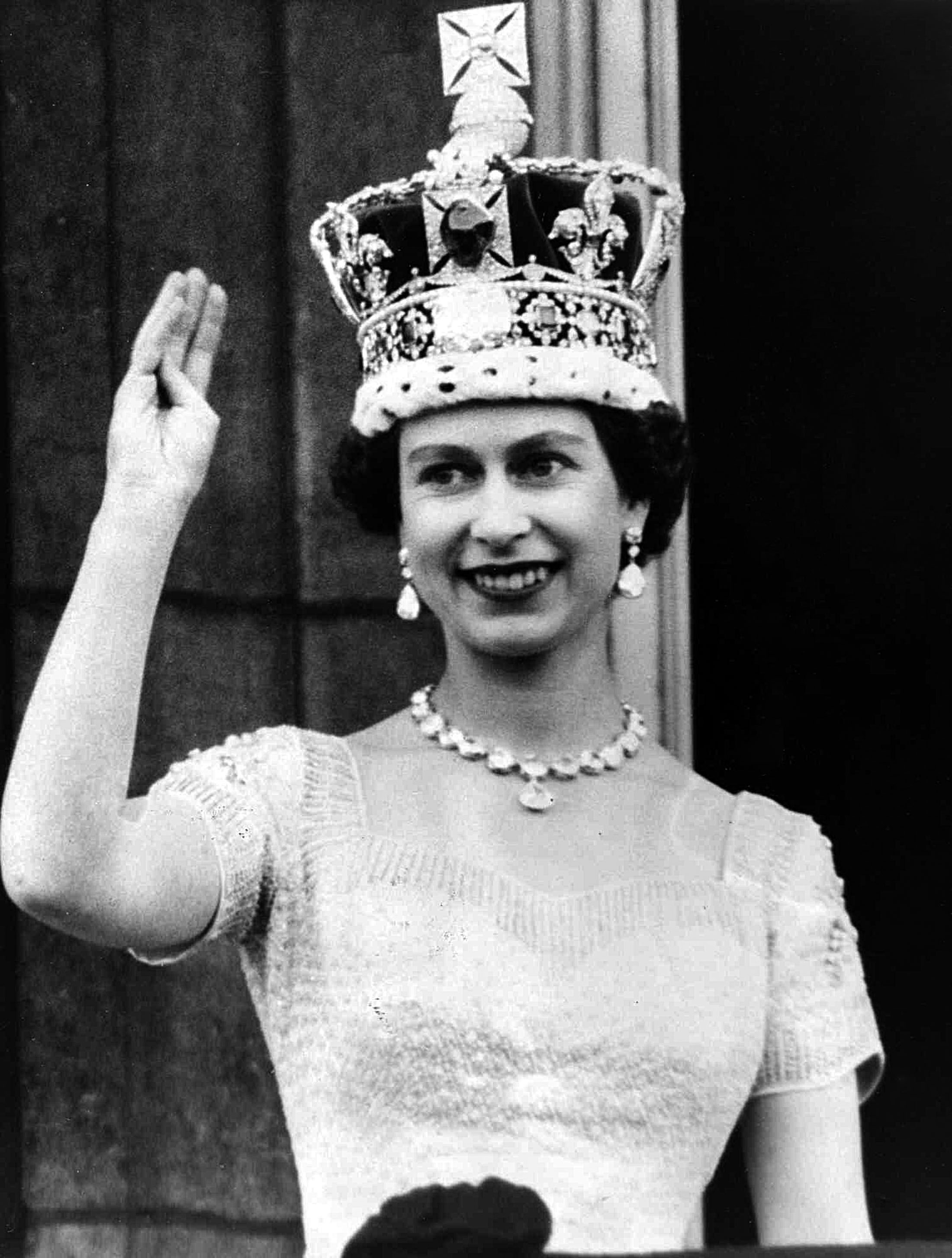
June 2: Elizabeth II, Queen of the United Kingdom and the other Commonwealth realms, crowned.

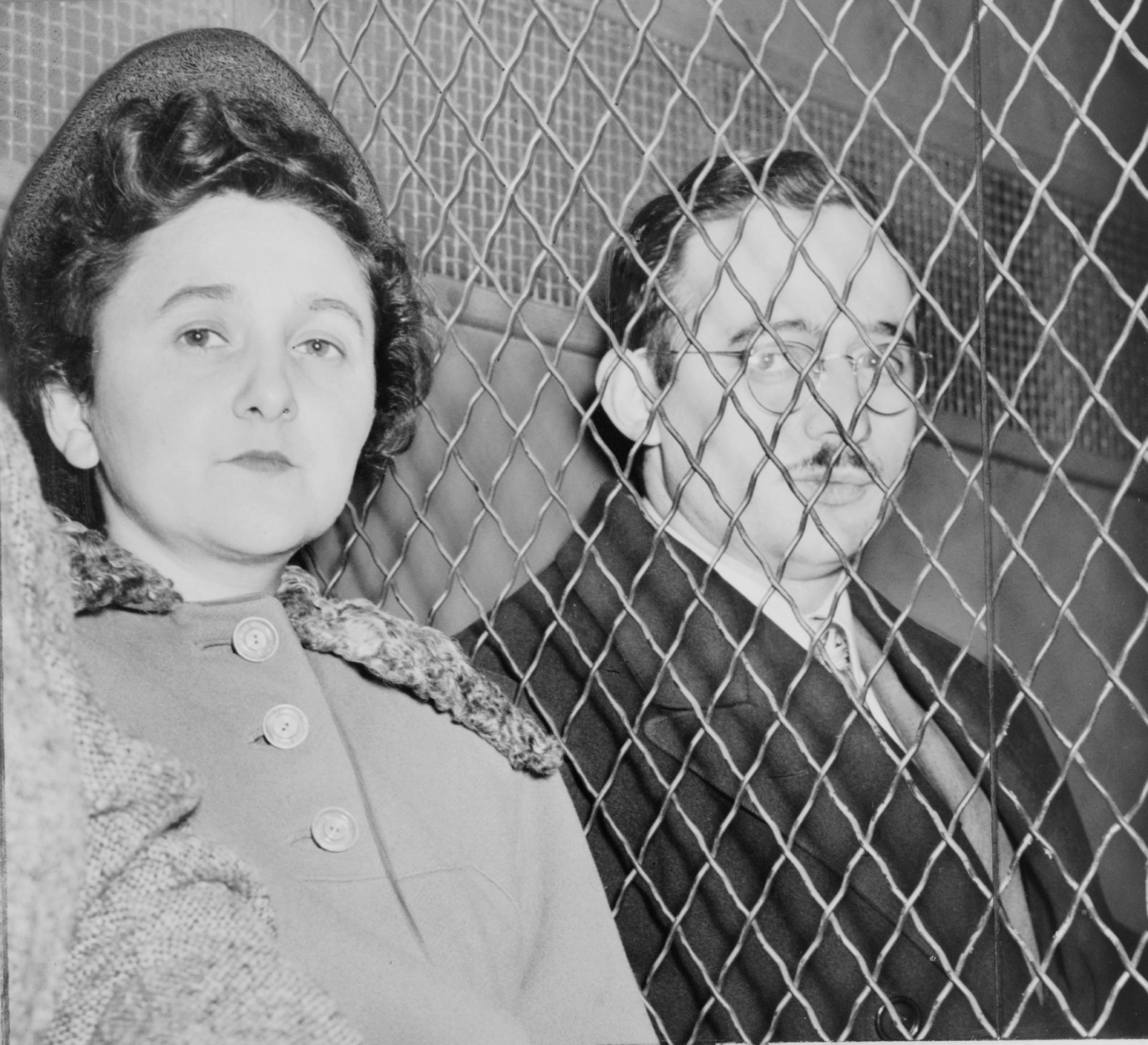
June 19: Julius and Ethel Rosenberg executed.

- June 1 – Uprising in Plzeň: Currency reform causes riots in Czechoslovakia.
- June 2 – Elizabeth II is crowned Queen of the United Kingdom and the other Commonwealth realms, at Westminster Abbey.
- June 7 – Italian general election: the Christian Democracy party wins a plurality in both legislative houses.
- June 7–9 – Flint–Worcester tornado outbreak sequence: A single storm-system spawns 46 tornadoes of various sizes, in 10 states from Colorado to Massachusetts, over 3 days, killing 246.
- June 8
  - On the second day of the Flint–Worcester tornado outbreak sequence, a tornado kills 116 in Flint, Michigan; it will be the last to claim more than 100 lives, until the 2011 Joplin tornado.
  - Austria and the Soviet Union open diplomatic relations.
- June 9
  - On the third day of the Flint–Worcester tornado outbreak sequence, a tornado spawned from the same storm system as the Flint tornado the day before hits in Worcester, Massachusetts, killing 94.
  - CIA Technical Services Staff head Sidney Gottlieb approves of the use of LSD in an MKUltra subproject.
- June 13 – Hungarian Prime Minister Mátyás Rákosi is replaced by Imre Nagy.
- June 17 – Workers' Uprising in East Germany: The Soviet Union orders a Division of troops into East Berlin to quell a rebellion.
- June 18
  - Egypt declares itself a republic.
  - Tachikawa air disaster: A United States Air Force Douglas C-124 Globemaster II crashes just after takeoff from Tachikawa Airfield near Tokyo, Japan, killing all 129 people on board in the worst air crash in history up to this time, and the first with a confirmed death toll exceeding 100.
- June 30 – The first roll-on/roll-off ferry crossing of the English Channel, Dover–Boulogne, takes place.

=== July ===
- July 3 – The first ascent of Nanga Parbat in the Pakistan Himalayas, the world's ninth highest mountain, is made by Austrian climber Hermann Buhl alone on a German–Austrian expedition.
- July 9
  - The U.S. Treasury formally renames the Bureau of Internal Revenue; the new name (which had previously been used informally) is the Internal Revenue Service.
  - Inauguration of the south lane of the Rodovia Anchieta.
- July 10 – The Soviet official newspaper Pravda announces that Lavrentiy Beria has been deposed as head of the NKVD.
- July 17 – The greatest recorded loss of United States midshipmen in a single event results from an aircraft crash near NAS Whiting Field.
- July 26 – Fidel Castro and his brother lead a disastrous assault on the Moncada Barracks, preliminary to the Cuban Revolution.
- July 27 – The Korean War ends, with the Korean Armistice Agreement: The United Nations Command (Korea) (United States), China and North Korea sign an armistice agreement at Panmunjom, and the north remains communist, while the south remains capitalist. No formal peace treaty is ever signed.

=== August ===
- August 5 – Operation Big Switch: Prisoners of war are repatriated to the United States after the Korean War.
- August 8 – Soviet prime minister Georgi Malenkov announces that the Soviet Union has a hydrogen bomb.
- August 12
  - The 1953 Ionian earthquake of magnitude 7.2 totally devastates Cephalonia and most of the other Ionian Islands, in Greece's worst natural disaster in centuries.
  - Soviet atomic bomb project: "Joe 4", the first Soviet thermonuclear weapon, is detonated at Semipalatinsk Test Site, Kazakh SSR.
- August 13 – Four million workers go on strike in France to protest against austerity measures.
- August 15–19 – Cold War: 1953 Iranian coup d'état – Overthrow of the democratically elected Prime Minister of Iran, Mohammad Mosaddegh, by Iranian military in favour of strengthening the monarchical rule of the Shah, Mohammad Reza Pahlavi, with the support of the United States Central Intelligence Agency (as "Operation Ajax") and the United Kingdom.
- August 17 – The first planning session of Narcotics Anonymous is held in Southern California (see October 5).
- August 20 – The French government ousts King Mohammed V of Morocco, and exiles him to Corsica.
- August 22 – The last prisoners are repatriated from Devil's Island to France.
- August 25 – The French general strike ends.
- August – High Arctic relocation of Inuit families by the Government of Canada.

=== September ===
- September 4 – The discovery of REM sleep is first published, by researchers Eugene Aserinsky and Nathaniel Kleitman.
- September 5 – The United Nations rejects the Soviet Union's suggestion to accept China as a member.
- September 7 – Nikita Khrushchev becomes head of the Soviet Central Committee.
- September 23 – The Pact of Madrid is signed by Francoist Spain and the United States of America, ending a period of virtual isolation for Spain.
- September 25 – The first German prisoners of war return from the Soviet Union to West Germany.
- September 26 – Rationing of sugar ends in the UK.

=== October ===
- October – The UNIVAC 1103 is the first commercial computer to use random-access memory.
- October 1 – The Mutual Defense Treaty Between the United States and the Republic of Korea is concluded in Washington, D.C.
- October 5
  - Earl Warren is appointed Chief Justice of the United States, by President Dwight D. Eisenhower.
  - The first meeting of Narcotics Anonymous is held (the first planning session was held August 17).
- October 6 – UNICEF, the United Nations Children's Fund, is made a permanent specialized agency of the United Nations.
- October 9
  - West German federal election, 1953: Konrad Adenauer is re-elected as German chancellor.
  - Fearing communist influence in British Guiana, the British Government suspends the constitution, declares a state of emergency, and militarily occupies the colony.
- October 10 – Roland (Monty) Burton wins the 1953 London to Christchurch air race, in under 23 hours flying time.
- October 12 – The play The Caine Mutiny Court-Martial opens at the Plymouth Theatre, New York.
- October 22 – Laos becomes independent from France.
- October 23 – Alto Broadcasting System (ABS) in the Philippines makes the first television broadcast in southeast Asia, through DZAQ-TV. Alto Broadcasting System is the predecessor of what will later become ABS-CBN Corporation.
- October 30 – Cold War: U.S. President Dwight D. Eisenhower formally approves the top secret document of the United States National Security Council NSC 162/2, which states that the United States' arsenal of nuclear weapons must be maintained and expanded to counter the communist threat.

=== November ===
- November 5 – David Ben-Gurion resigns as prime minister of Israel.
- November 9
  - Cambodia becomes independent from France.
  - The Laotian Civil War begins between the Kingdom of Laos and the Pathet Lao, all the while resuming the First Indochina War against the French Army in a Two-front war.
  - King Abdulaziz Al Saud passed away at the age of 77, at his palace in the Taif Governorate, Makkah Region.
- November 20
  - The Douglas D-558-2 Skyrocket, piloted by Scott Crossfield, becomes the first crewed aircraft to reach Mach 2.
  - Authorities at the Natural History Museum, London announce that the skull of Piltdown Man (allegedly an early human discovered in 1912) is a hoax.
- November 20–22 – First Indochina War: Operation Castor – In a massive airborne operation in Vietnam, French forces establish a base at Điện Biên Phủ.
- November 21 – Puerto Williams is founded in Chile, as the southernmost settlement of the world.
- November 25 – Match of the Century (1953 England v Hungary football match): The England national football team loses 6–3 to Hungary at Wembley Stadium, their first ever loss to a continental team at home.
- November 29 – First Indochina War: Battle of Dien Bien Phu – French paratroopers consolidate their position at Điện Biên Phủ.
- November 30 – Kabaka crisis: Edward Mutesa II, the kabaka (king) of Buganda, is deposed and exiled to London by Sir Andrew Benjamin Cohen, Governor of Uganda.

=== December ===
- December 2 – The United Kingdom and Iran reform diplomatic relations.
- December 6 – With the NBC Symphony Orchestra, conductor Arturo Toscanini performs what he claims is his favorite Beethoven symphony, Eroica, for the last time. The live performance is broadcast across the United States on radio, and later released on records and CD.
- December 7 – A visit to Iran by American Vice President Richard Nixon sparks several days of riots, as a reaction to the August 19 overthrow of the government of Mohammed Mossadegh by the U.S.-backed Shah. Three students are shot dead by police in Tehran. This event becomes an annual commemoration.
- December 8 – U.S. President Dwight D. Eisenhower delivers his Atoms for Peace address, to the United Nations General Assembly.
- December 17 – The U.S. Federal Communications Commission (FCC) approves color television (using the NTSC standard).
- December 23 – The Soviet Union announces officially that Lavrentiy Beria has been executed.
- December 24 – Tangiwai disaster: A railway bridge collapses at Tangiwai, New Zealand, sending a fully loaded passenger train into the Whangaehu River; 151 are killed.
- December 25 – The Amami Islands are returned to Japan, after 8 years of United States military occupation.
- December 30 – Ramon Magsaysay becomes the 7th President of the Philippines.

=== Date unknown ===
- Global meat packing industry JBS is founded in Anapolis, Goias, Brazil.
- China First Building Corporation, a partial predecessor of China State Construction Engineering, is founded in Beijing.

== Births ==
=== January ===
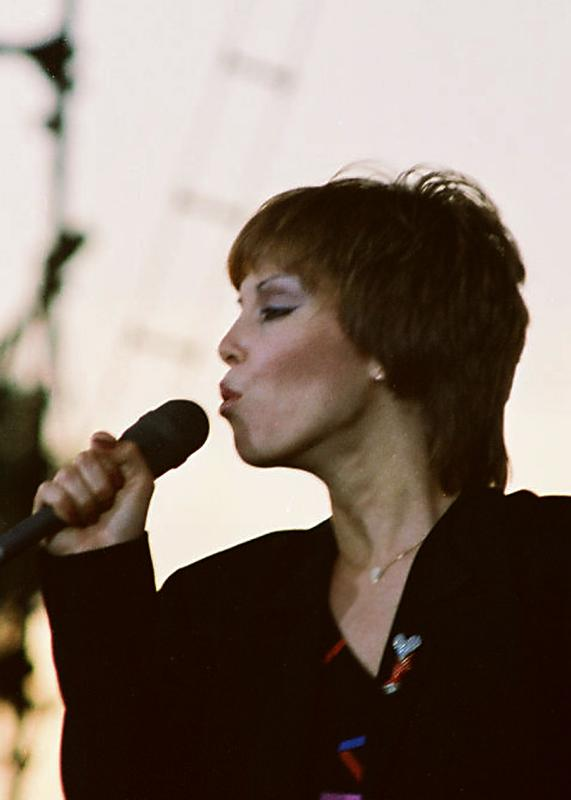
Pat Benatar

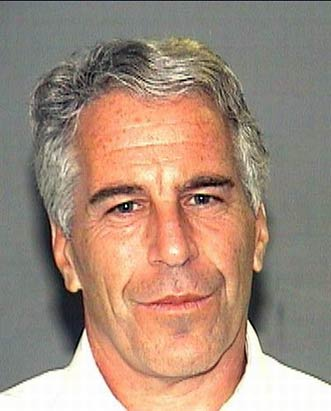
Jeffrey Epstein

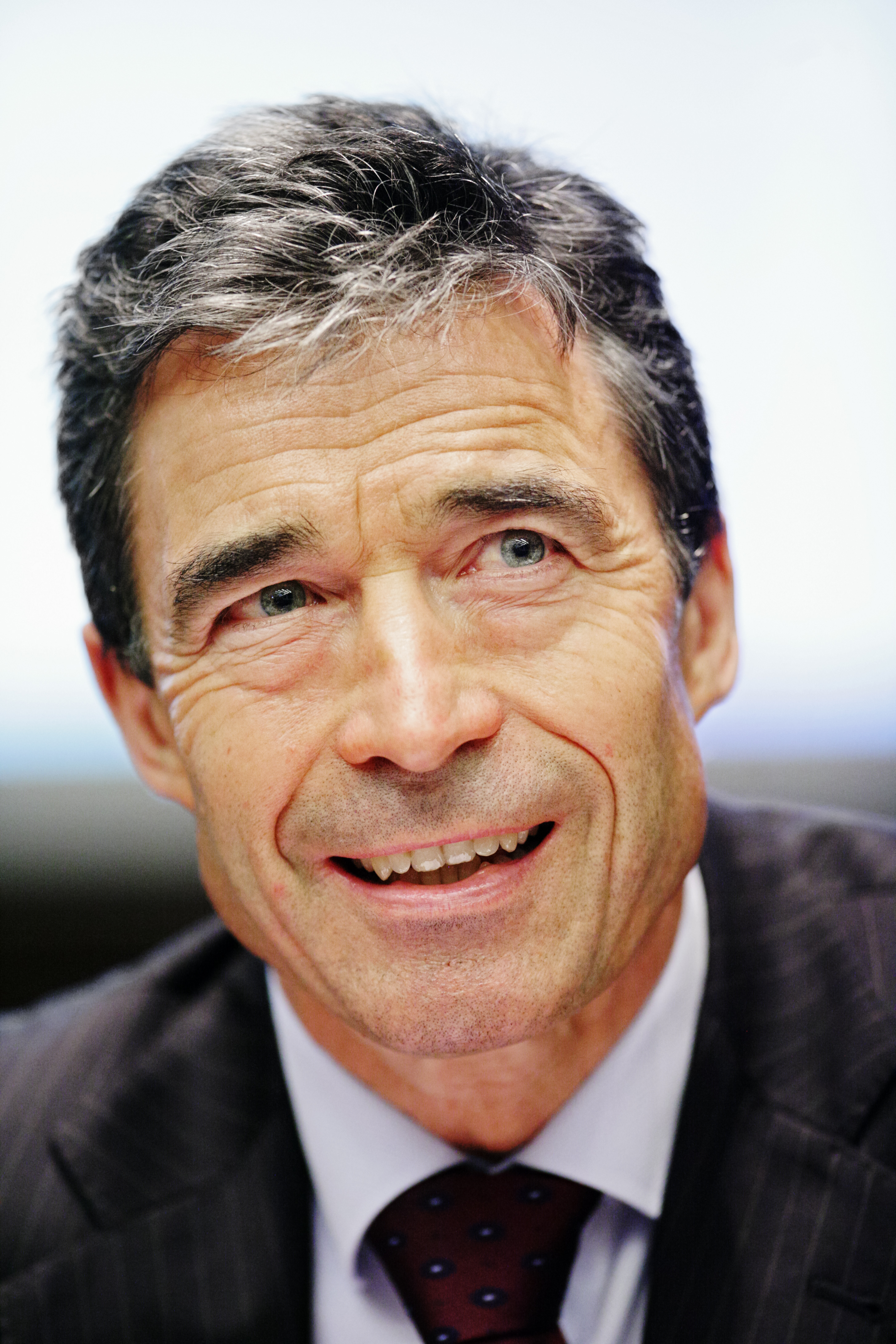
Anders Fogh Rasmussen

- January 1 – Gary Johnson, American businessman, politician and 29th Governor of New Mexico
- January 4 – George Tenet, American Central Intelligence Agency director
- January 5
  - Pamela Sue Martin, American actress
  - Mike Rann, Australian politician
- January 6 – Malcolm Young, Australian musician (d. 2017)
- January 7 – Dionne Brand, Canadian writer and documentarian
- January 9 – Javad Alizadeh, Iranian cartoonist
- January 10
  - Pat Benatar, American rock singer
  - Bobby Rahal, American race car driver
  - Karl Bohnak, American politician and member of the Michigan House of Representatives since 2025
- January 11 – Eduard Kučera, Czech businessman, co-founder of Avast software
- January 13 – John Wake, English cricketer
- January 16 – Robert Jay Mathews, American neo-Nazi, founder of the terrorist group The Order (d. 1984)
- January 19 – Richard Legendre, Canadian tennis player, politician
- January 20 – Jeffrey Epstein, American financier and sex offender (d. 2019)
- January 21 – Paul Allen, American entrepreneur, co-founder of Microsoft (d. 2018)
- January 22
  - Myung-whun Chung, South Korean conductor, pianist
  - Jim Jarmusch, American director
- January 23
  - Dušan Nikolić, Yugoslav footballer (d. 2018)
  - Eliza Roberts, American actress, producer and casting director
- January 24 – Moon Jae-in, 19th President of South Korea
- January 26
  - Anders Fogh Rasmussen, Prime Minister of Denmark, Secretary General of NATO
  - Lucinda Williams, American singer-songwriter
- January 28 – Colin Campbell, Canadian ice hockey player, executive
- January 29
  - Peter Baumann, German keyboard player, songwriter (Tangerine Dream)
  - Paulin Bordeleau, Canadian ice hockey player
  - Lynne McGranger, Australian actress
  - Juan Paredes, Mexican boxer
  - Louie Pérez, American singer-songwriter and guitarist
  - Fred Riebeling, Australian politician
  - Grażyna Szmacińska, Polish chess player
  - Teresa Teng, Taiwanese singer (d. 1995)
  - Yorie Terauchi, Japanese actress
  - Hwang Woo-suk, South Korean veterinarian, academic
- January 31 – Sergei Ivanov, Russian first deputy prime minister and minister of defense (d. 2026)

=== February ===
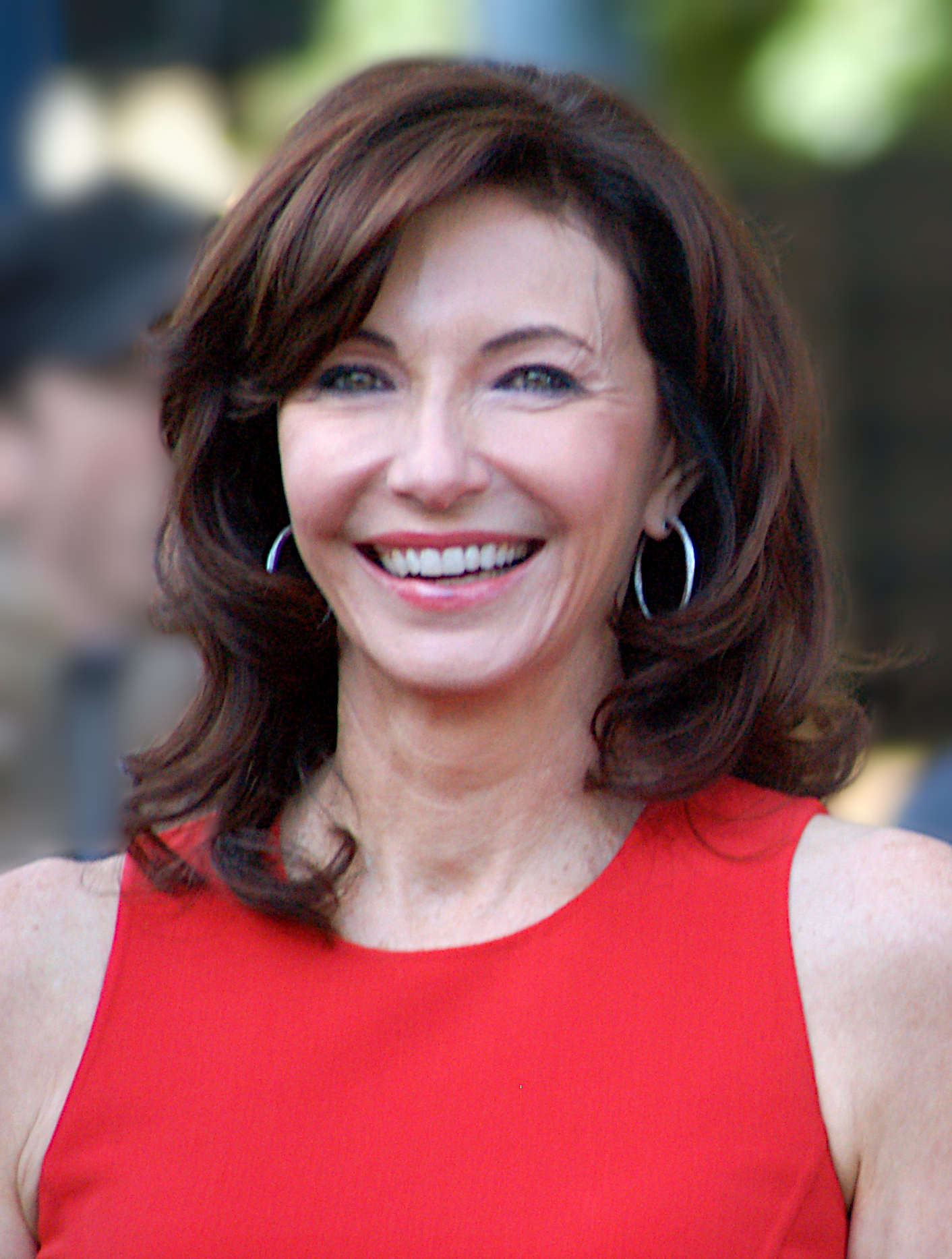
Mary Steenburgen

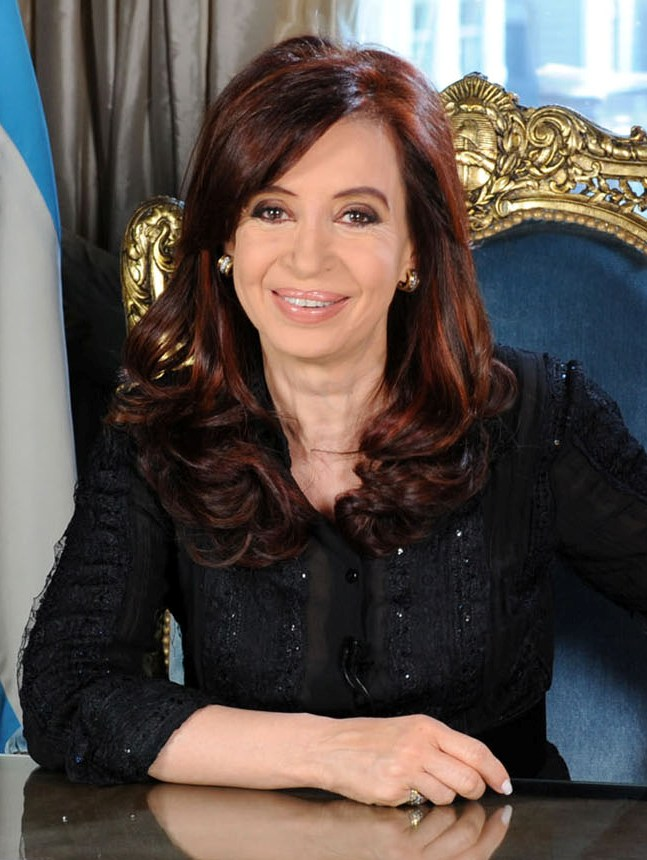
Cristina Fernández de Kirchner

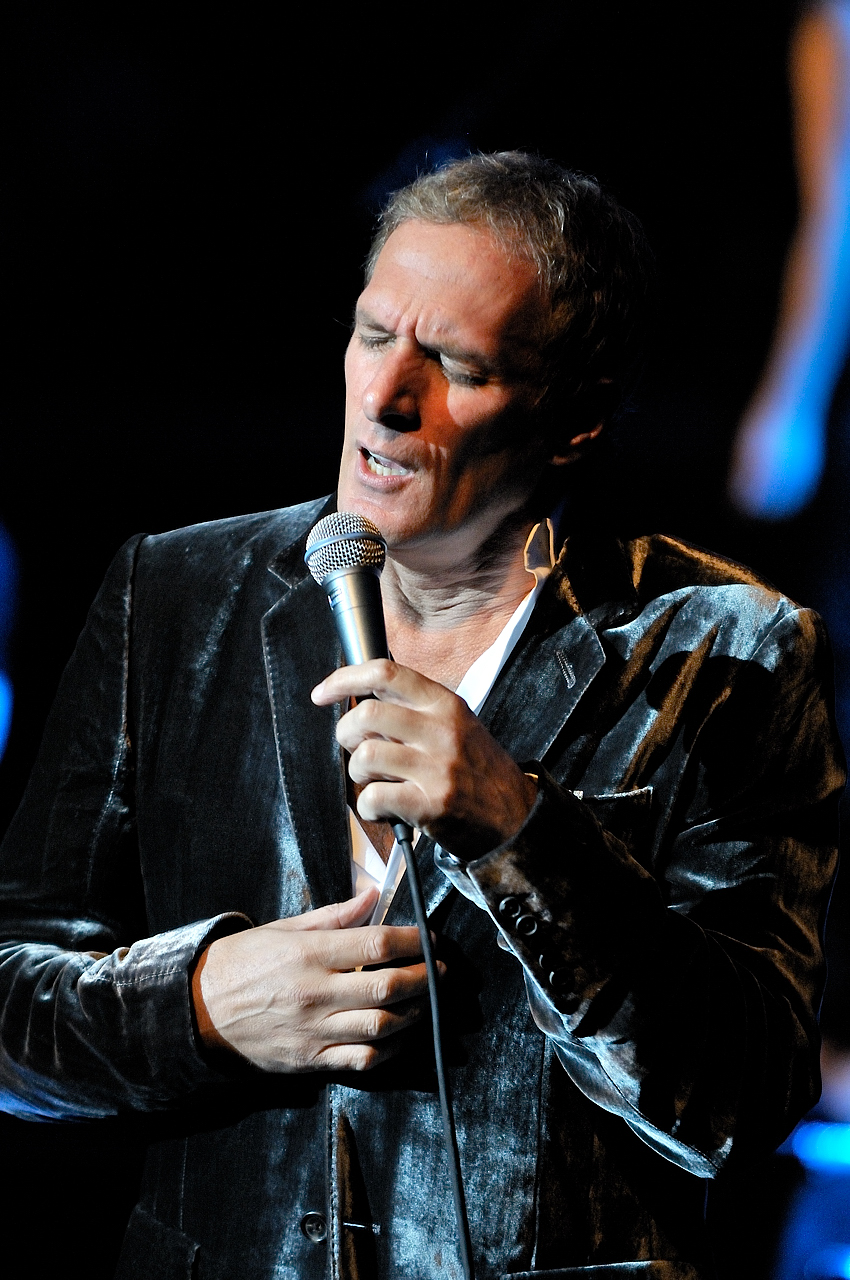
Michael Bolton

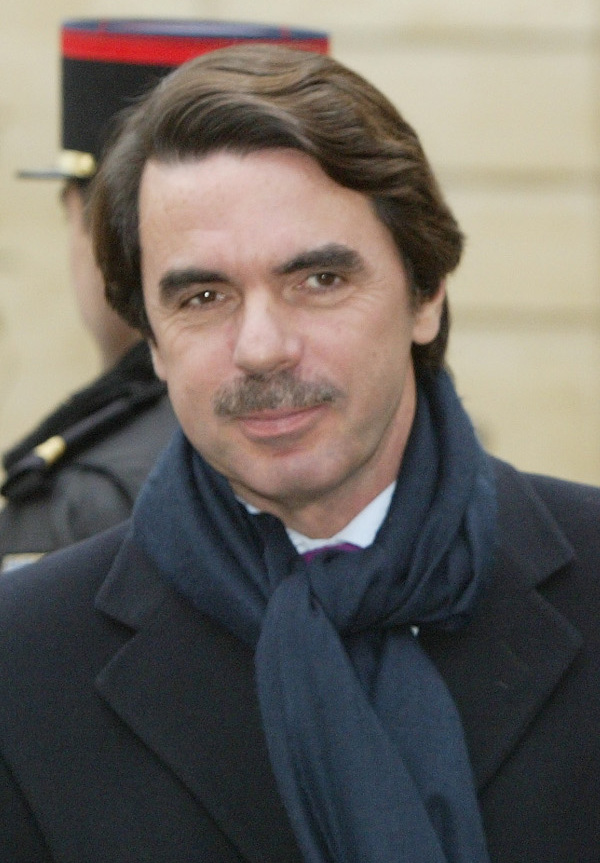
José María Aznar

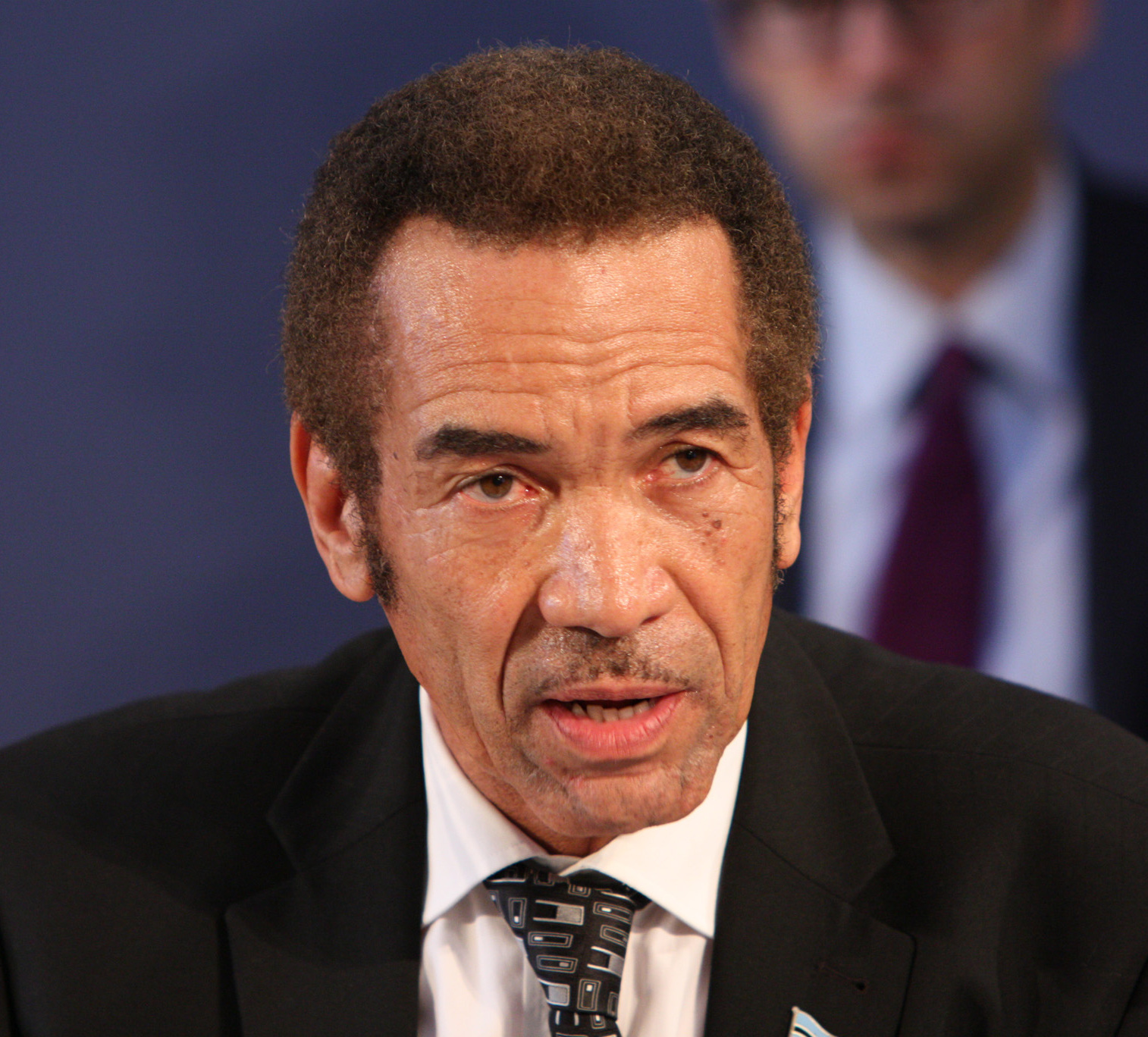
Ian Khama

- February 2 – Duane Chapman, American bounty hunter
- February 4 – Kitarō, Japanese New Age musician
- February 7 – Dan Quisenberry, American baseball player (d. 1998)
- February 8 – Mary Steenburgen, American actress
- February 9
  - Ciarán Hinds, Irish actor
  - Rick Wagoner, American automotive executive
- February 10 – June Jones, American quarterback, current NCAA Football head coach at Southern Methodist University
- February 11 – Jeb Bush, American politician, 43rd Governor of Florida
- February 12
  - Bernard Sabrier, Swiss financial entrepreneur
  - Nabil Shaban, Jordanian-British actor and writer
- February 14 – Sergey Mironov, Russian statesman, Speaker of the Federation Council
- February 19
  - Cristina Fernández de Kirchner, Argentine lawyer and politician, President of Argentina and Vice President of Argentina
  - Massimo Troisi, Italian actor, film director (d. 1994)
- February 20 – Riccardo Chailly, Italian orchestral conductor
- February 21 – William Petersen, American actor
- February 22 – Geoffrey Perkins, British comedy producer, writer and actor (d. 2008)
- February 24 – Sarath Chandrasiri Muthukumarana, Sri Lankan politician, MP (2010–2024) (d. 2025)
- February 25
  - José María Aznar, Prime Minister of Spain
  - Martin Kippenberger, German artist
- February 26 – Michael Bolton, American singer
- February 27
  - Ian Khama, 4th President of Botswana
  - Yolande Moreau, Belgian actress, writer and director
- February 28
  - Paul Krugman, American economist
  - Ricky Steamboat, American professional wrestler
  - Osmo Vänskä, Finnish orchestral conductor

=== March ===
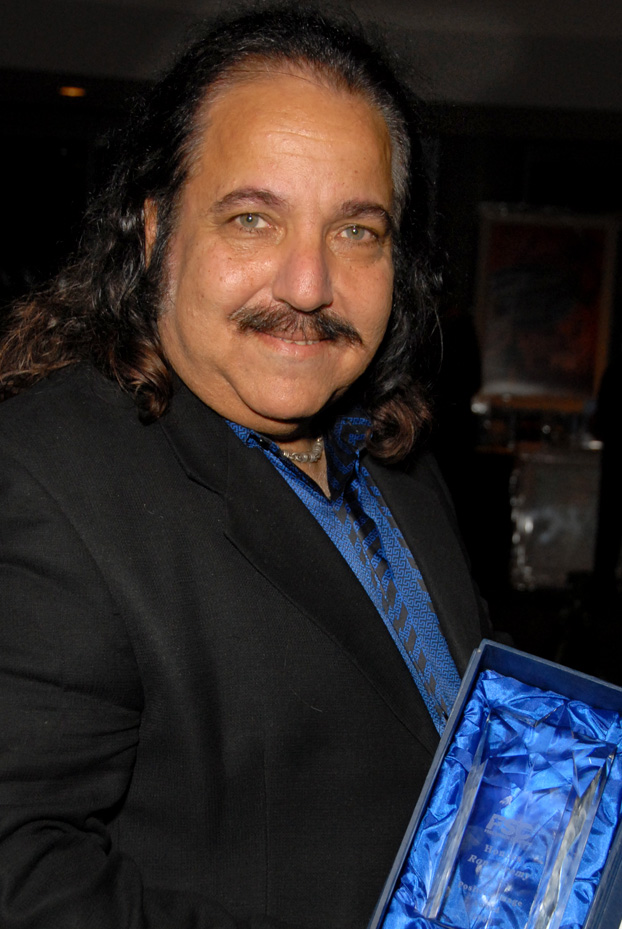
Ron Jeremy

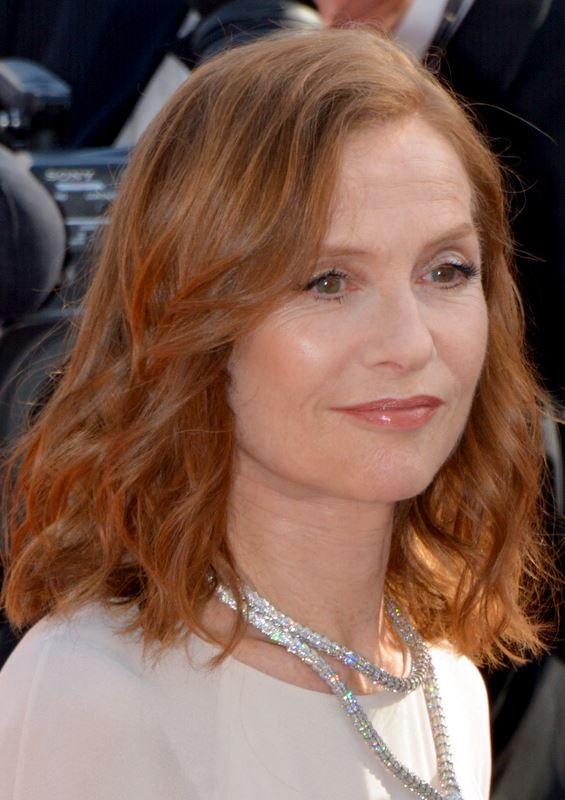
Isabelle Huppert

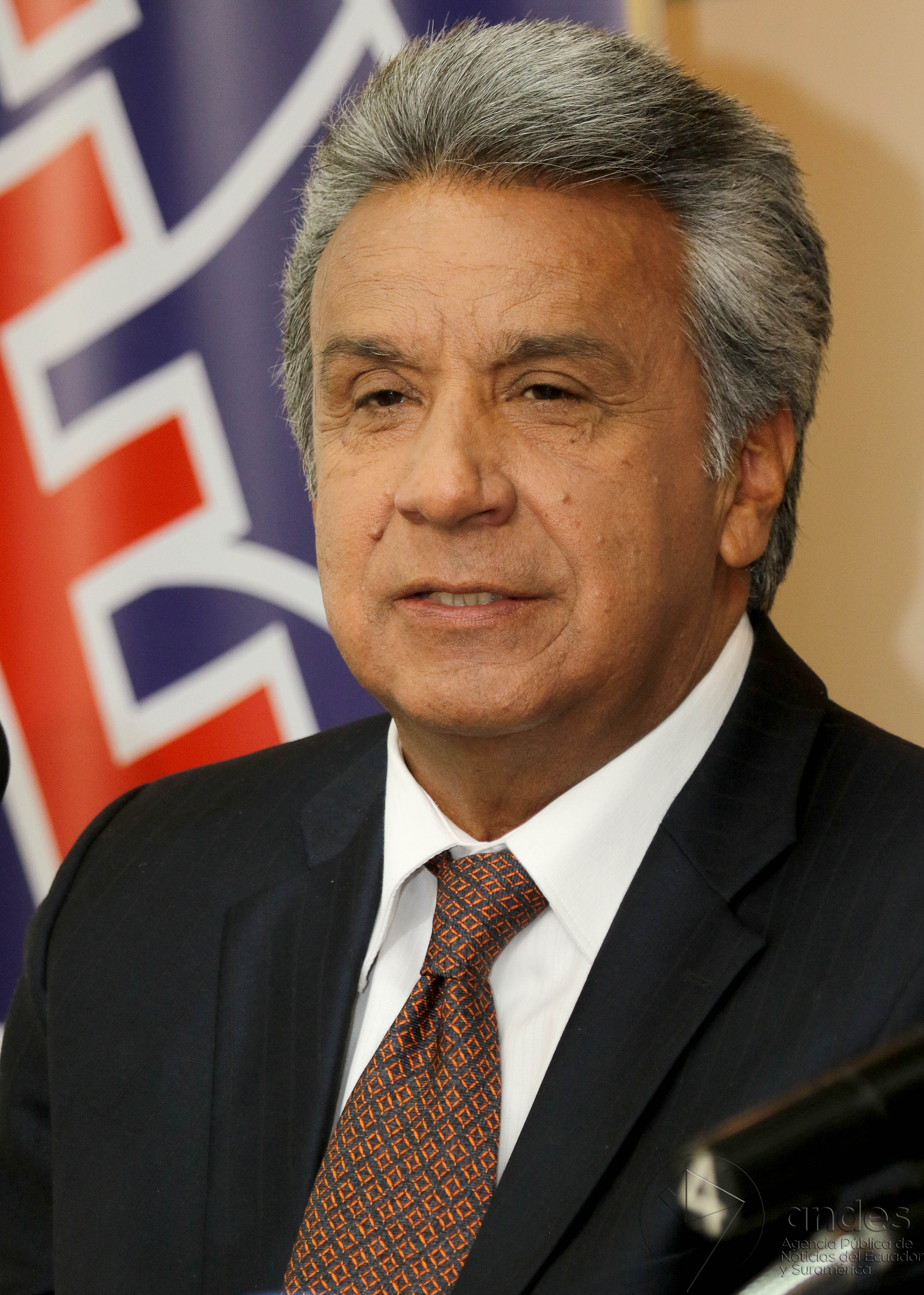
Lenín Moreno

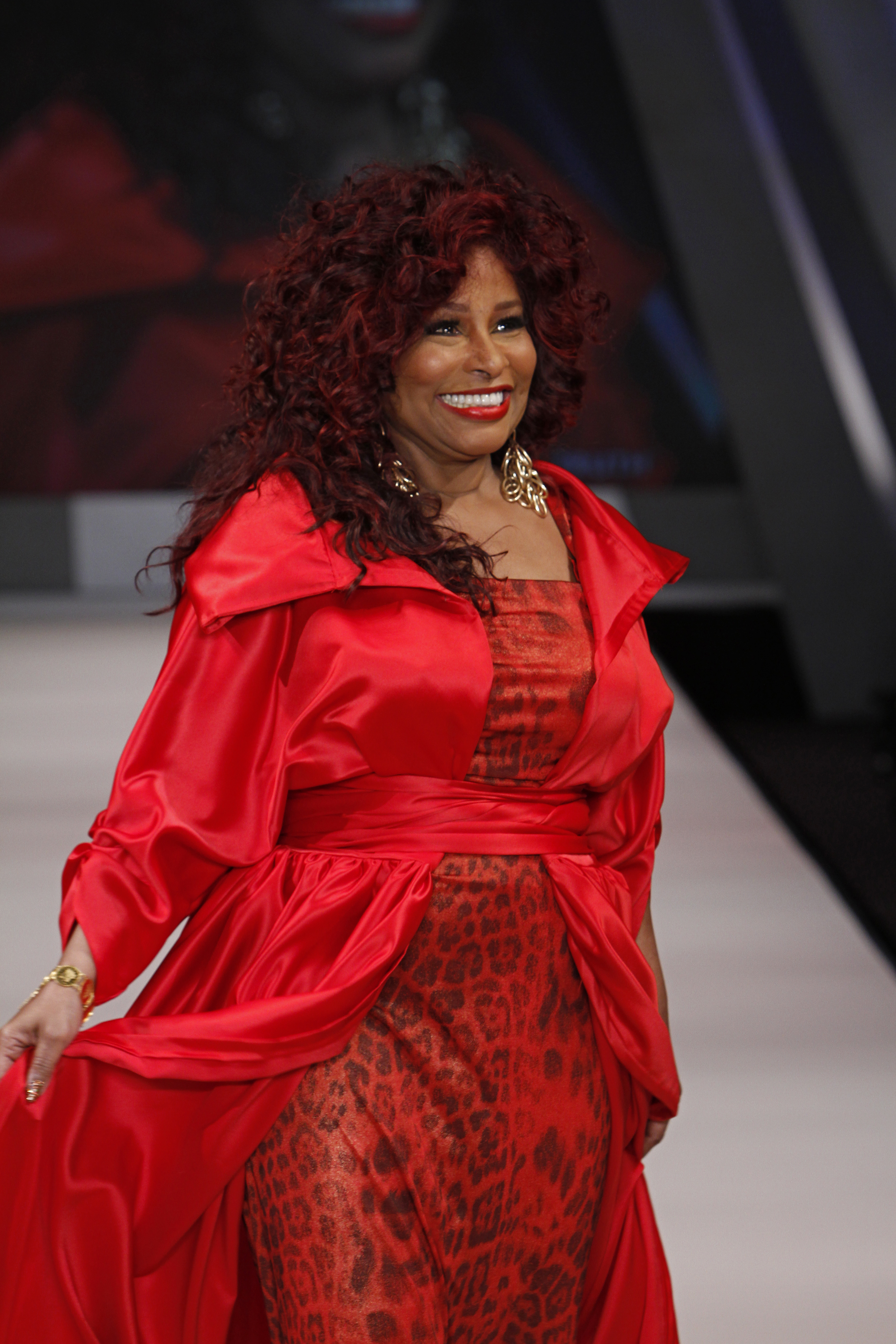
Chaka Khan

- March 1
  - Richard Bruton, Irish politician, economist
  - M. K. Stalin, Indian politician
- March 3
  - Arthur Antunes Coimbra, Brazilian footballer, manager
  - Robyn Hitchcock, British singer-songwriter
  - Agustí Villaronga, Spanish filmmaker
- March 4
  - Emilio Estefan, Cuban percussionist
  - Scott Hicks, Australian film director
  - Rose Laurens, French singer-songwriter (d. 2018)
  - Kay Lenz, American actress
- March 5 – Tokyo Sexwale, South African businessman, politician, anti-apartheid activist and political prisoner
- March 6 – Jan Kjærstad, Norwegian author
- March 10 – Debbie Brill, Canadian high jumper
- March 11
  - László Bölöni, Romanian footballer
  - Bernie LaBarge, Canadian guitarist/vocalist
- March 12
  - Carl Hiaasen, American author
  - Ron Jeremy, American pornographic film actor, filmmaker and stand-up comedian
  - Madhav Kumar Nepal, Nepalese politician
- March 14 – Johan Ullman, Swedish medical doctor, physicist and inventor
- March 15 – Kumba Iala, Guinea-Bissauan politician, 3rd President of Guinea-Bissau (d. 2014)
- March 16
  - Bryan Duncan, American Christian musician
  - Isabelle Huppert, French actress
  - Richard Stallman, American free software proponent
- March 17 – Filemon Lagman, Filipino revolutionary (d. 2001)
- March 18 – Takashi Yoshimatsu, Japanese composer
  - Jon Haukeland – Norwegian ice hockey coach and administrator
- March 19 – Lenín Moreno, Ecuadorian politician, 44th President of Ecuador
- March 20 – Sándor Csányi, Hungarian business executive, banker
- March 23 – Chaka Khan, African-American soul singer
- March 24 – Mathias Richling, German comedian
- March 26
  - Lincoln Chafee, American politician
  - Elaine Chao, American politician, wife of Senator Mitch McConnell
- March 28 – Melchior Ndadaye, 4th President of Burundi (d. 1993)

=== April ===
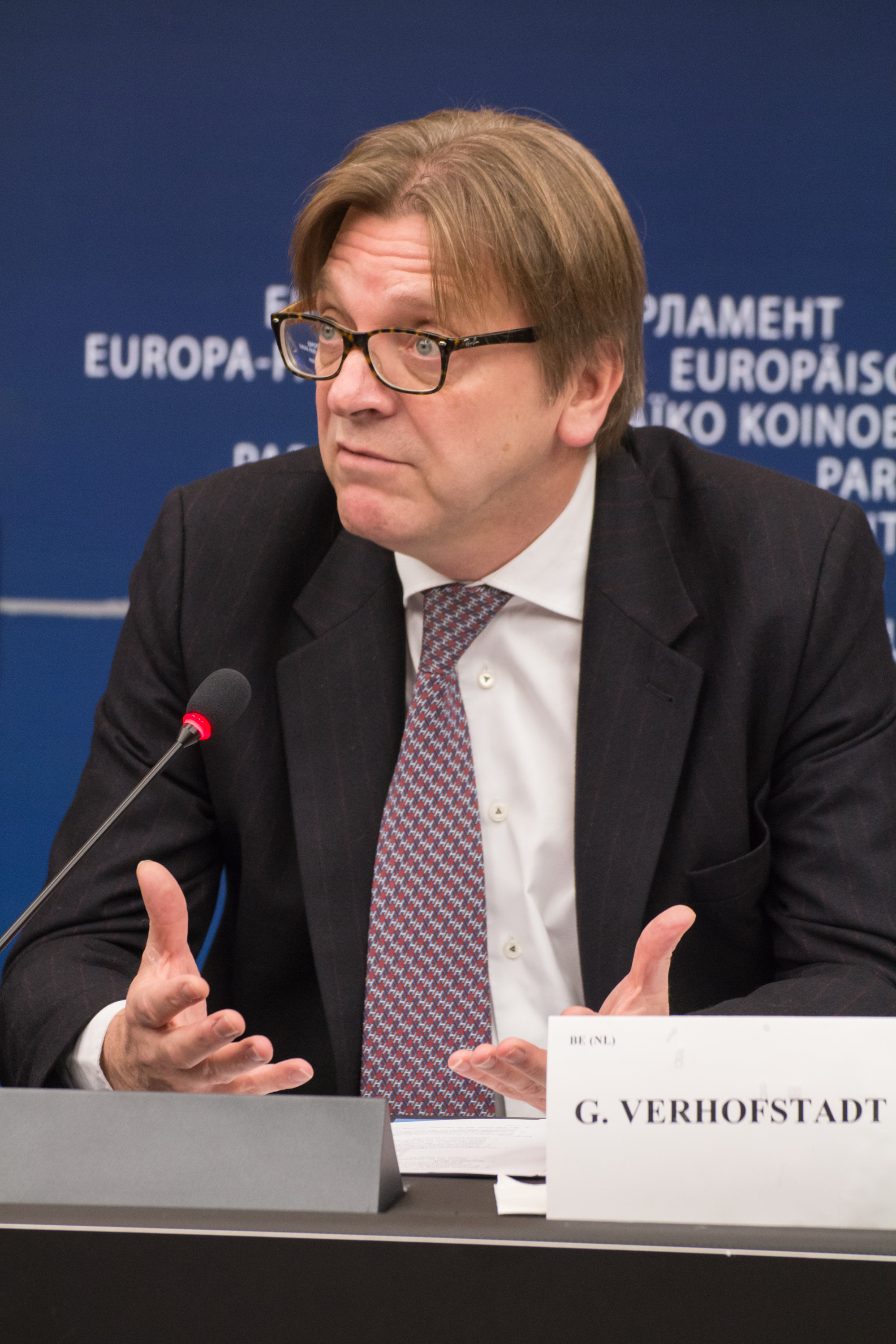
Guy Verhofstadt

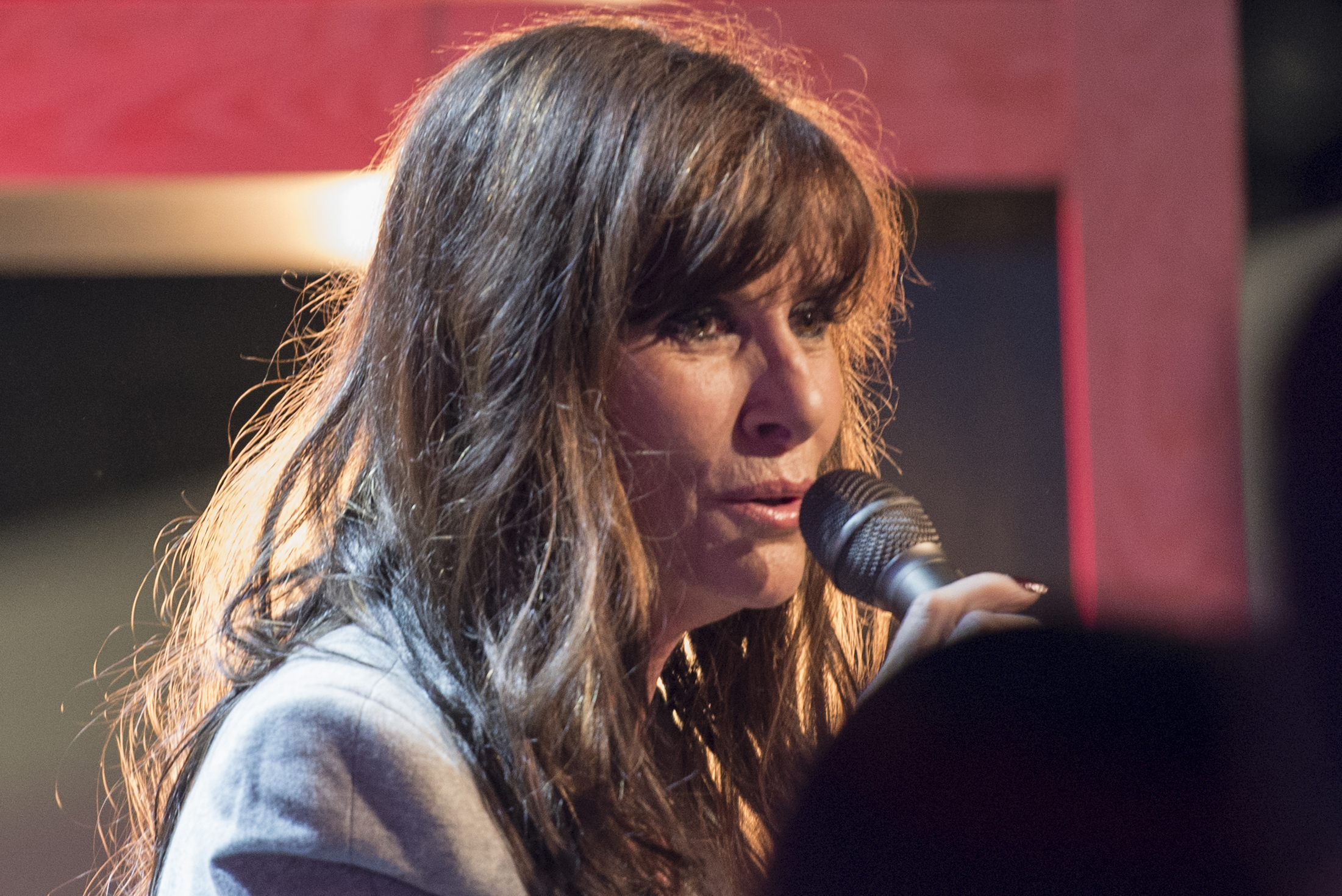
Linda Martin

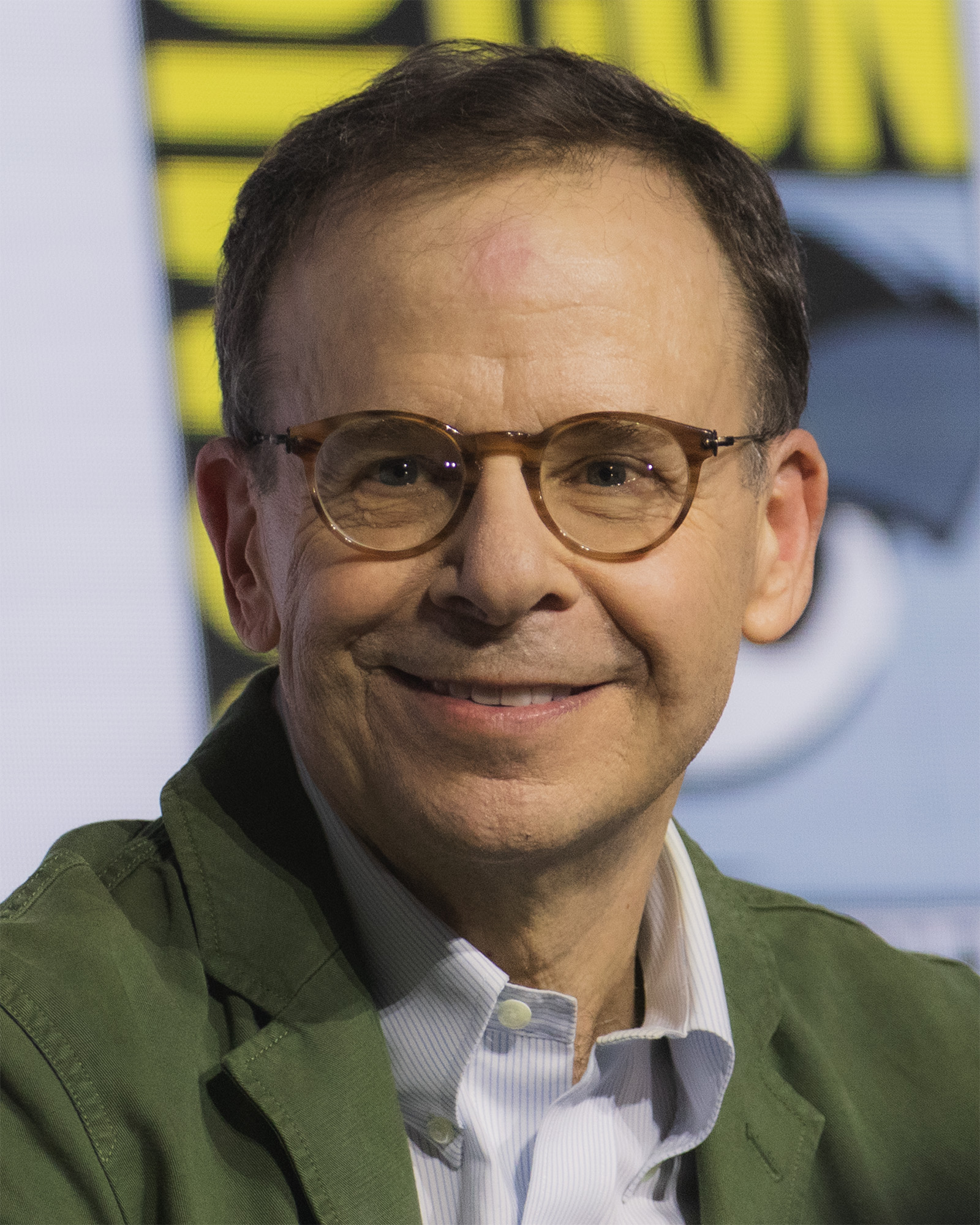
Rick Moranis

- April 2 – Jim Allister, Irish politician
- April 3
  - Sandra Boynton, American author, songwriter and illustrator
  - Russ Francis, American football player
- April 4 – Robert Bertrand, Canadian politician
- April 6 – Andy Hertzfeld, American computer programmer
- April 9 – John Howard, English singer-songwriter
- April 10 – Heiner Lauterbach, German actor
- April 11
  - Guy Verhofstadt, Prime Minister of Belgium
  - Andrew Wiles, British-born mathematician
- April 13 – Stephen Byers, English Labour Party politician, Secretary of State for Transport
- April 14 – Eric Tsang, Hong Kong actor
- April 16
  - Peter Garrett, Australian musician, politician
  - J. Neil Schulman, American writer, activist
- April 17 – Linda Martin, Irish singer, television presenter and Eurovision Song Contest 1992 winner
- April 18
  - Rick Moranis, Canadian actor
  - Sk. Mujibur Rahman, Bengali politician
- April 19
  - Sara Simeoni, Italian high jumper
  - Ruby Wax, American-born British-based performer
- April 20 – Sebastian Faulks, British novelist
- April 24 – Eric Bogosian, American actor, playwright, monologist and novelist
- April 25 – Ron Clements, American animation director, producer
- April 28
  - Roberto Bolaño, Chilean author (d. 2003)
  - Kim Gordon, American rock musician
- April 29
  - Nikolai Budarin, Russian cosmonaut
  - Bill Drummond, South African-born British artist and musician (The KLF, K Foundation etc.)
- April 30 – Merrill Osmond, American pop singer

=== May ===
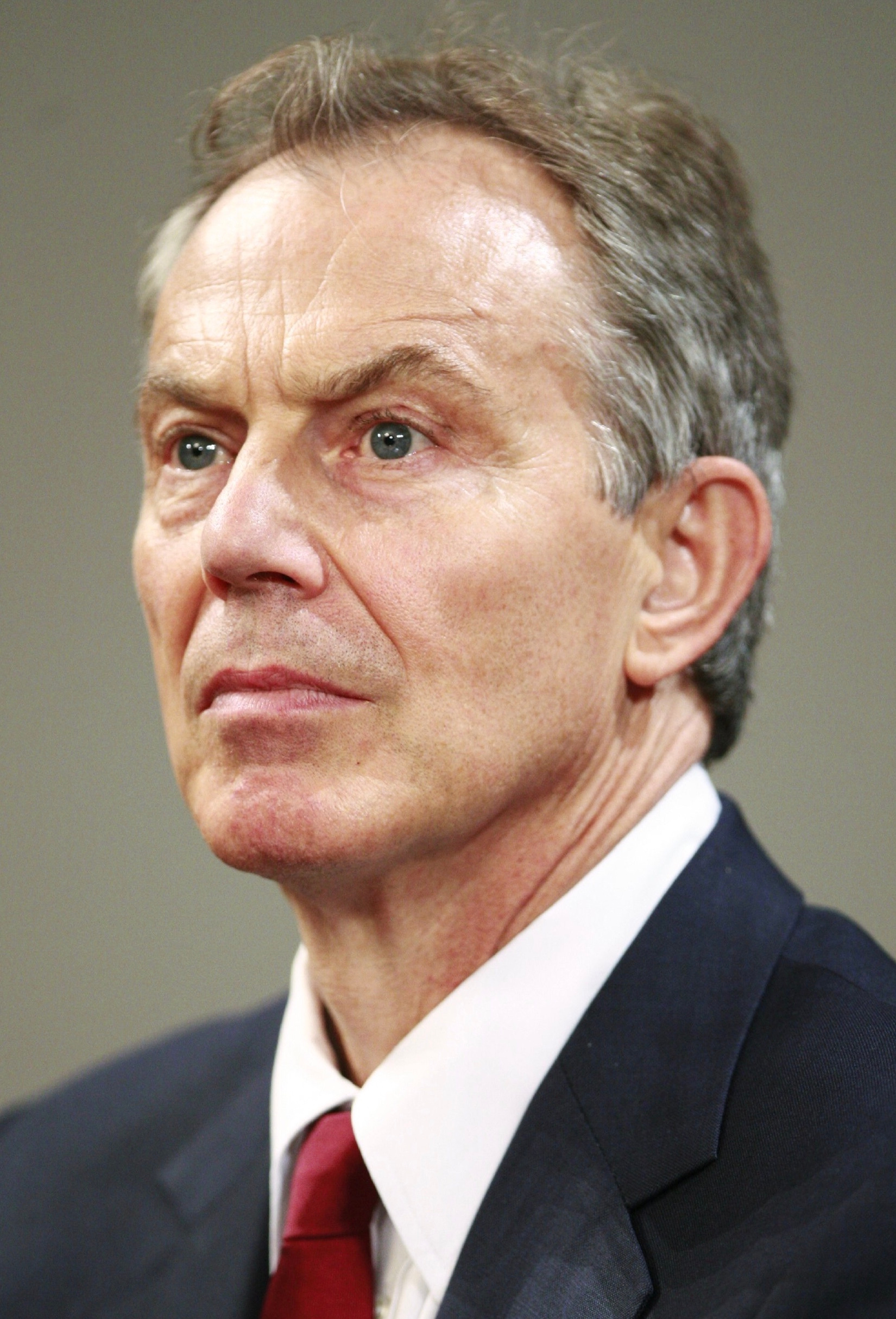
Tony Blair

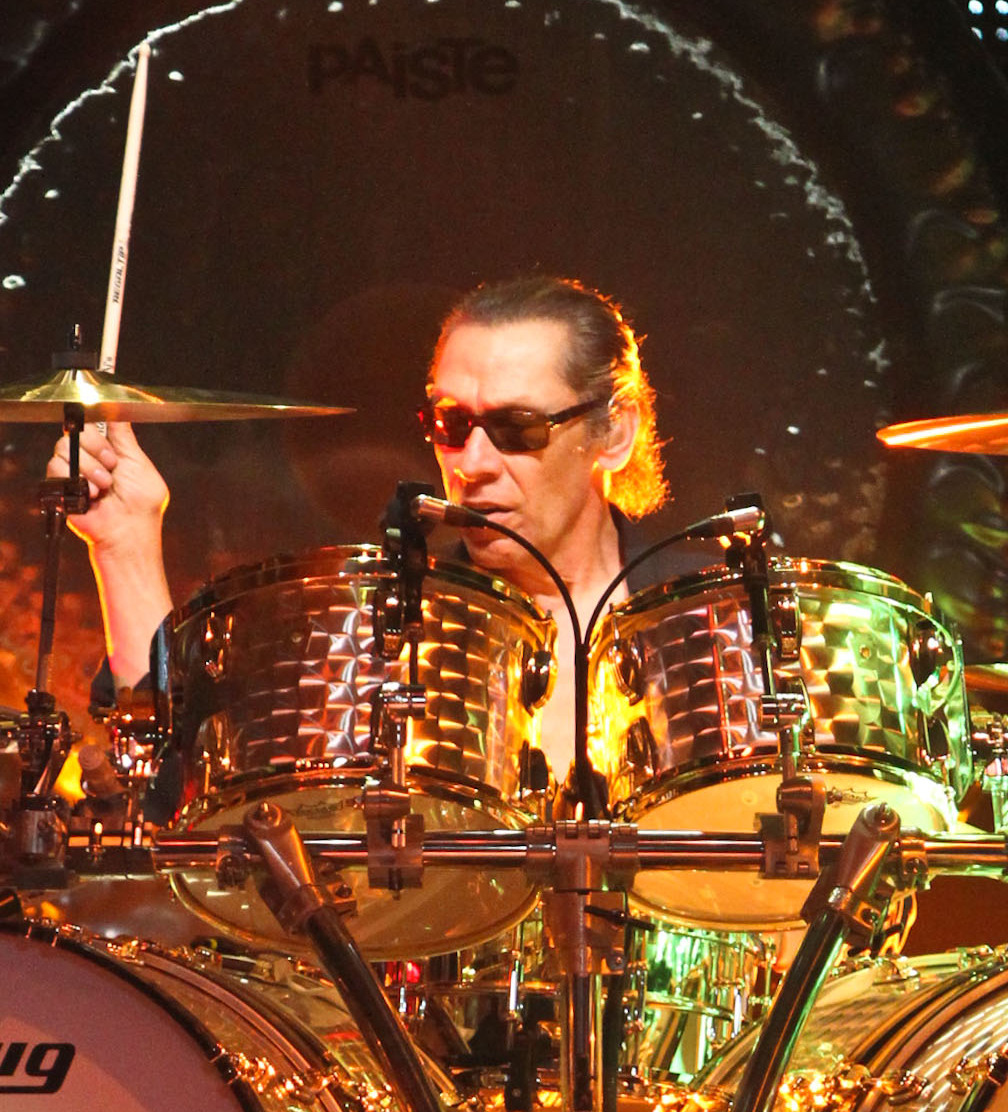
Alex Van Halen

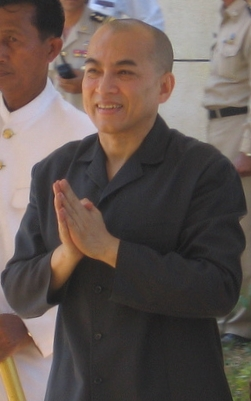
Norodom Sihamoni

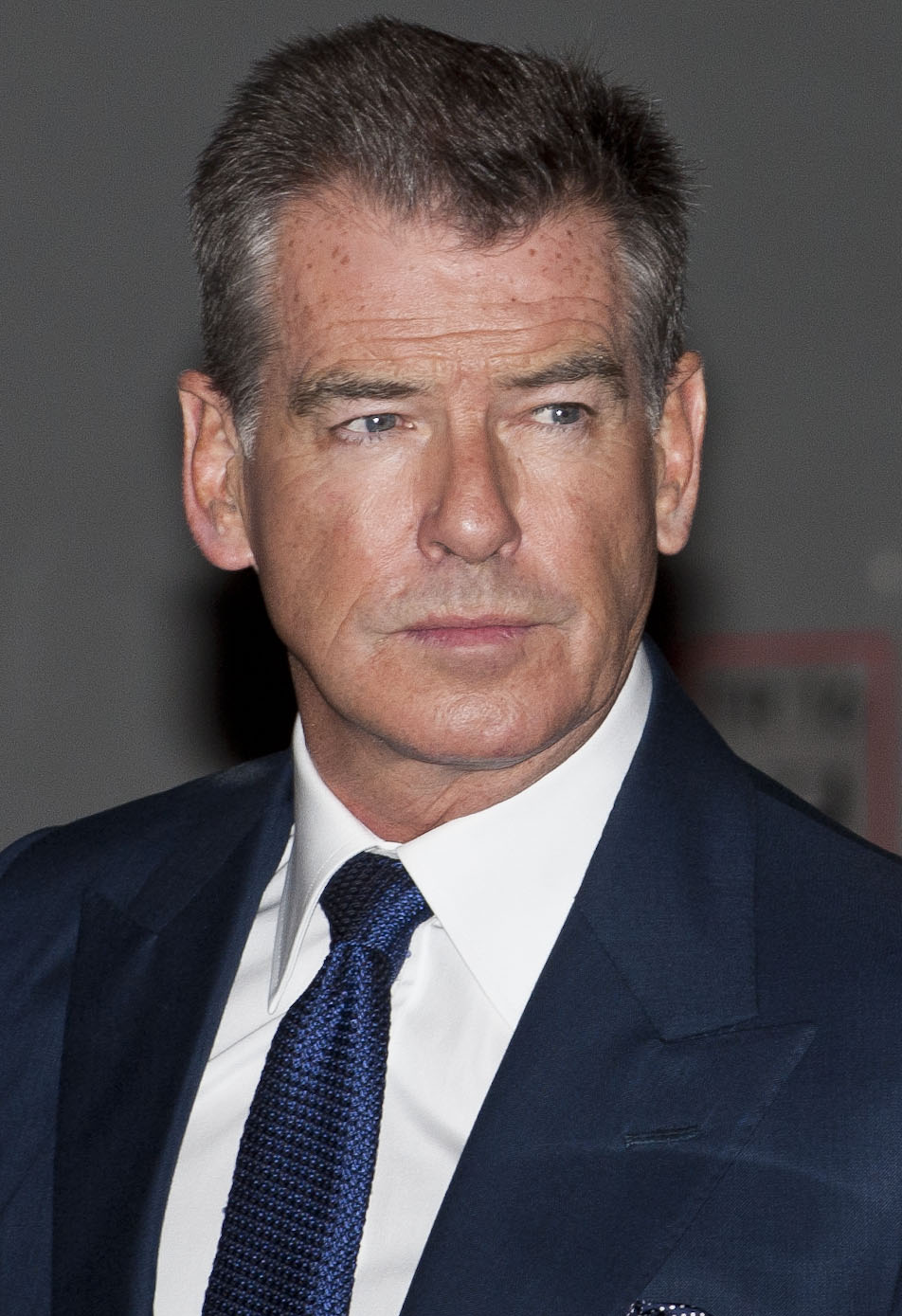
Pierce Brosnan

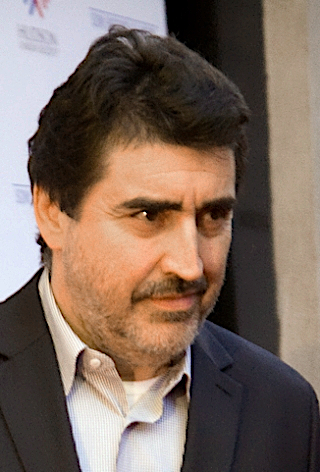
Alfred Molina

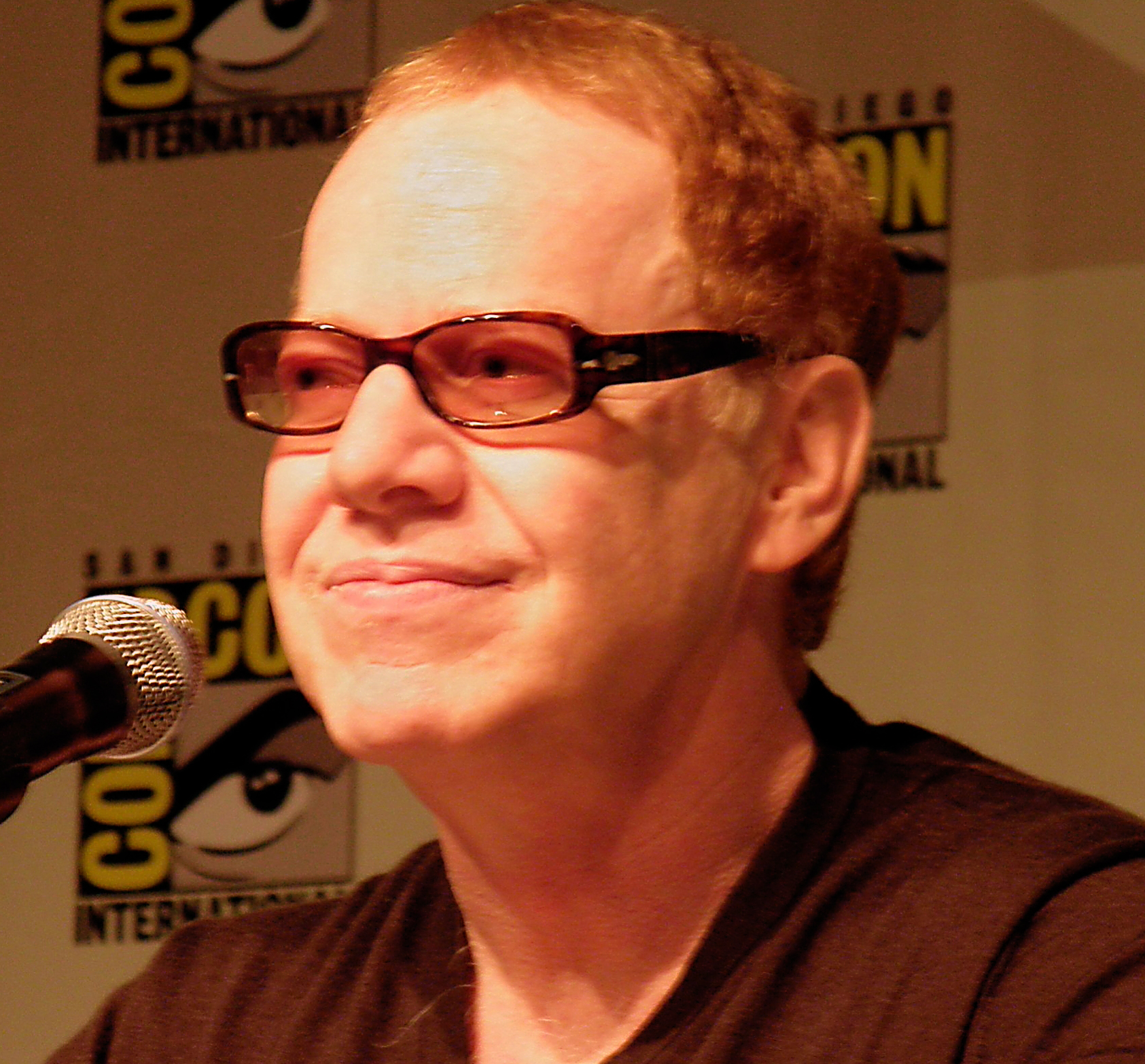
Danny Elfman

- May 2
  - Valery Gergiev, Russian-Ossetian conductor
  - Jamaal Wilkes, American basketball player
- May 3
  - Salman Hashimikov, Soviet heavyweight wrestler
  - Gary Young, American musician (Pavement, Gary Young's Hospital)
- May 5
  - Ibrahim Zakzaky, Nigerian Shia-Islam cleric
  - Dieter Zetsche, German auto executive
- May 6
  - Aleksandr Akimov, Soviet engineer who was the shift supervisor during the events of the Chernobyl disaster (d. 1986)
  - Tony Blair, Prime Minister of the United Kingdom
  - Graeme Souness, Scottish footballer, manager
  - Lynn Whitfield, African-American actress
- May 7 – Ian McKay, British soldier (VC recipient) (d. 1982)
- May 8
  - Billy Burnette, American musician
  - Alex Van Halen, Dutch-born American rock musician
- May 9 – Amy Hill, American actress and comedian
- May 11 – David Gest, American entertainer, producer and television personality (d. 2016)
- May 14
  - Michael Hebranko, American exemplar of morbid/mortal obesity (d. 2013)
  - Norodom Sihamoni, King of Cambodia
- May 15
  - George Brett, American Major League Baseball player
  - Mike Oldfield, English composer (Tubular Bells)
- May 16
  - Pierce Brosnan, Irish actor
  - Richard Page, American musician
- May 17 – Luca Prodan, Italian–Scottish musician and singer (d. 1987)
- May 19 – Victoria Wood, English comic performer (d. 2016)
- May 20 – Robert Doyle, Australian politician
- May 21 – Jim Devine, British politician
- May 23 – Agathe Uwilingiyimana, 4th Prime Minister of Rwanda (d. 1994)
- May 24 – Alfred Molina, English actor
- May 26
  - Kay Hagan, American lawyer, banking executive and politician (d. 2019)
  - Michael Portillo, English politician
- May 29
  - Aleksandr Abdulov, Russian actor (d. 2008)
  - Danny Elfman, American composer
- May 30 – Colm Meaney, Irish actor
- May 31 – Kathie Sullivan, American singer

=== June ===
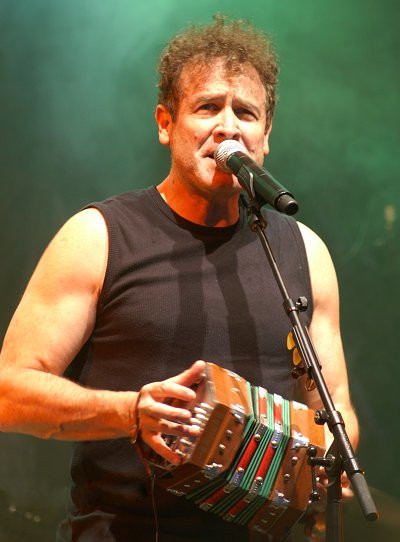
Johnny Clegg

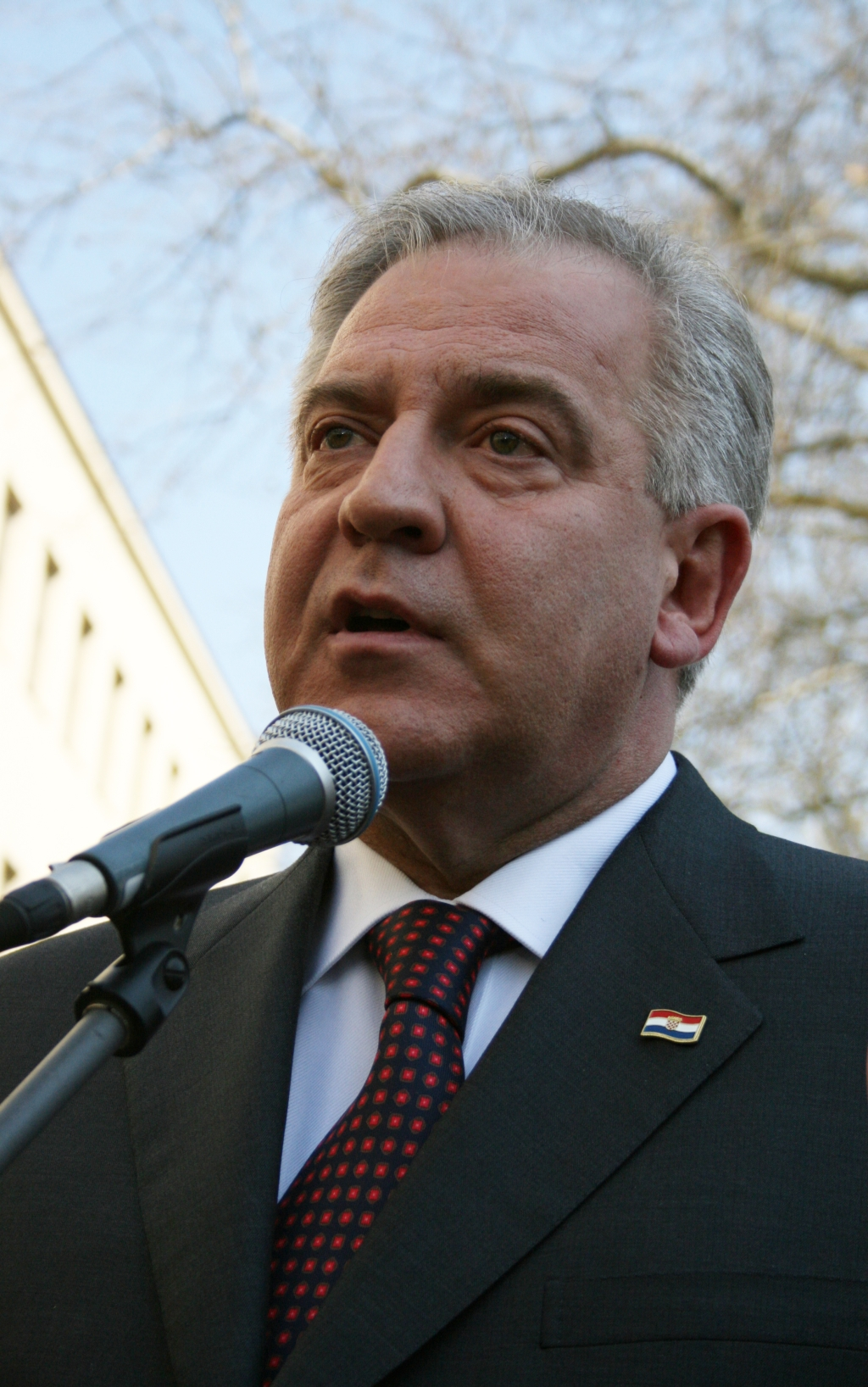
Ivo Sanader

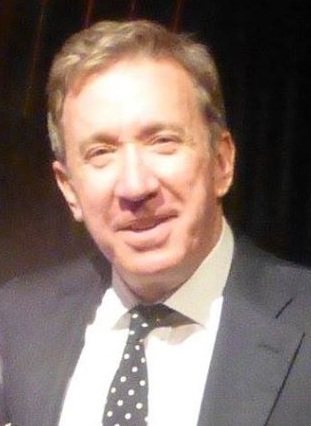
Tim Allen

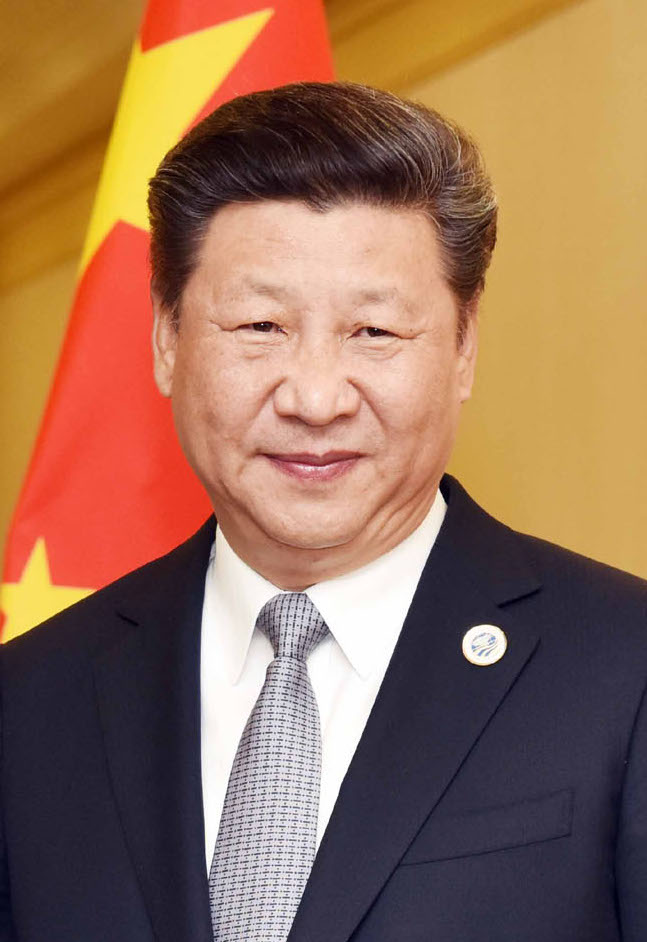
Xi Jinping

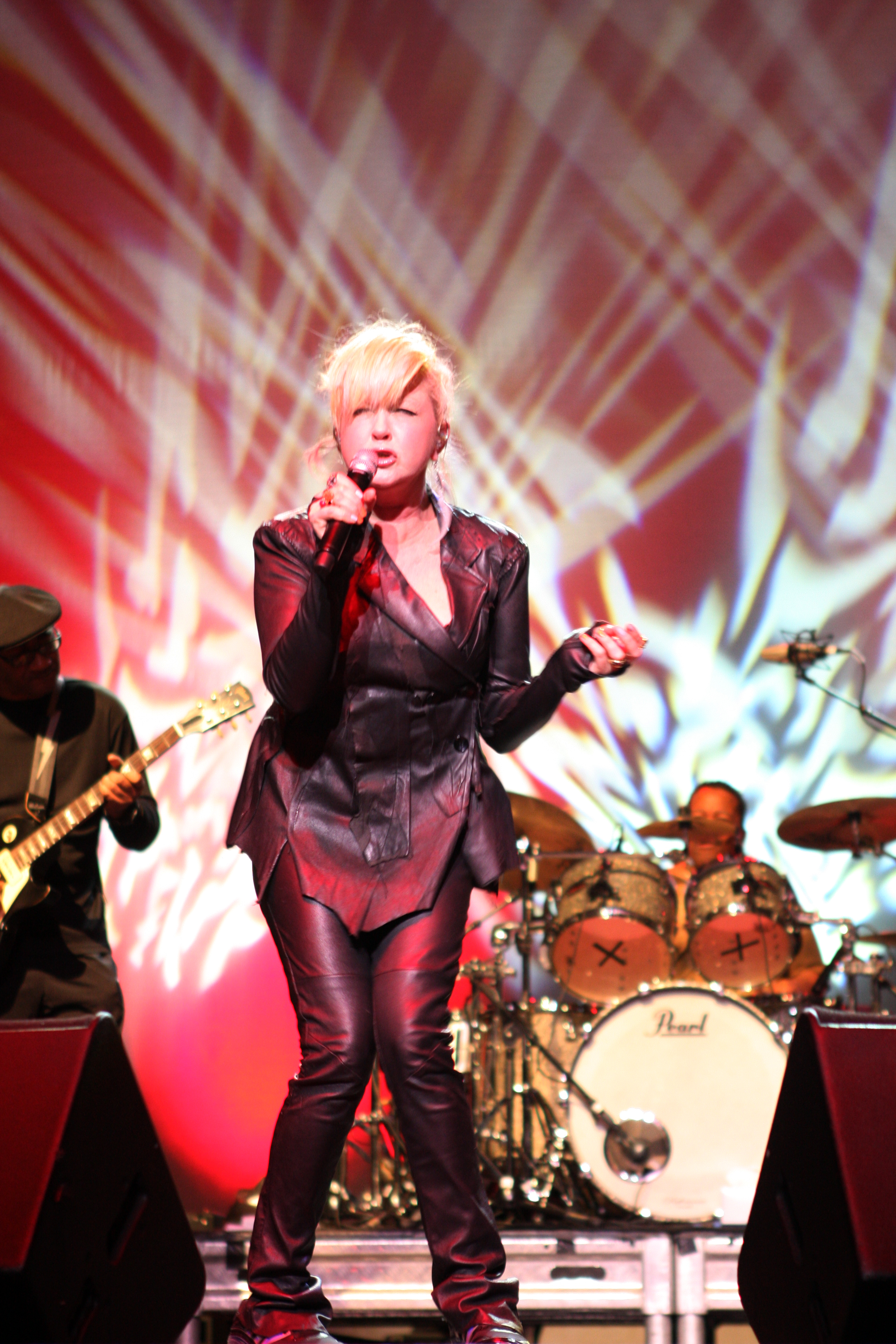
Cyndi Lauper

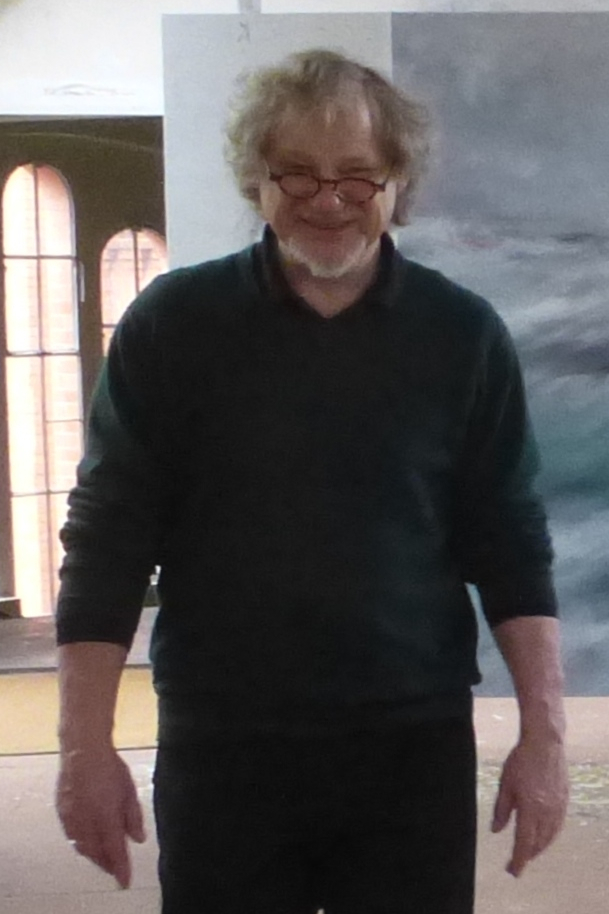
Ingo Kühl

- June 1
  - David Berkowitz, American serial killer
  - Diana Canova, American actress, adjunct professor
- June 2
  - Keith Allen, British actor
  - Cornel West, African-American philosopher, political activist, social critic, author
- June 3 – Erland Van Lidth De Jeude, Dutch-born wrestler, opera singer and actor (d. 1987)
- June 4
  - Paul De Meo, American screenwriter, producer (d. 2018)
  - Susumu Ojima, Japanese entrepreneur
- June 5 – Kathleen Kennedy, American film producer
- June 7
  - Johnny Clegg, South African Zulu musician and anthropologist (d. 2019)
  - Dougie Donnelly, Scottish television broadcaster
- June 8 – Ivo Sanader, 8th Prime Minister of Croatia
- June 10 – John Edwards, American politician
- June 11
  - Peter Bergman, American actor
  - Barbara Minty, American model
- June 12 – Michael Donovan, Canadian voice actor
- June 13
  - Tim Allen, American actor, comedian (Toy Story)
  - Atso Almila, Finnish conductor, composer
- June 15
  - Antonia Rados, Austrian television journalist
  - Xi Jinping, General Secretary of the Chinese Communist Party, Paramount leader of China
- June 20 – Ulrich Mühe, German actor (d. 2007)
- June 21 – Benazir Bhutto, Prime Minister of Pakistan (d. 2007)
- June 22
  - Wim Eijk, Dutch archbishop
  - Cyndi Lauper, American singer
- June 23
  - Vincenzo Di Nicola, Italian-Canadian psychologist, psychiatrist and philosopher
- June 24 – Ivo Lill, Estonian artist
- June 29
  - Don Dokken, American rock singer, musician
  - Colin Hay, Scottish-born Australian singer-songwriter (Men at Work)
  - Ingo Kühl, German painter, sculptor and architect

=== July ===
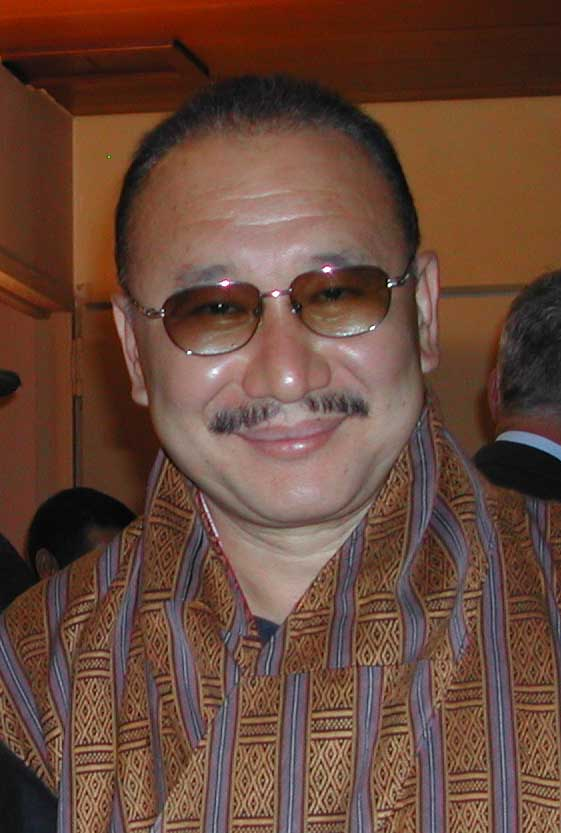
Sangay Ngedup

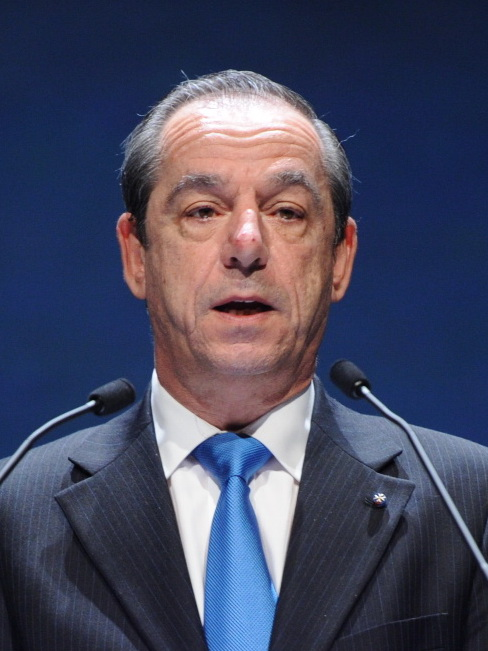
Lawrence Gonzi

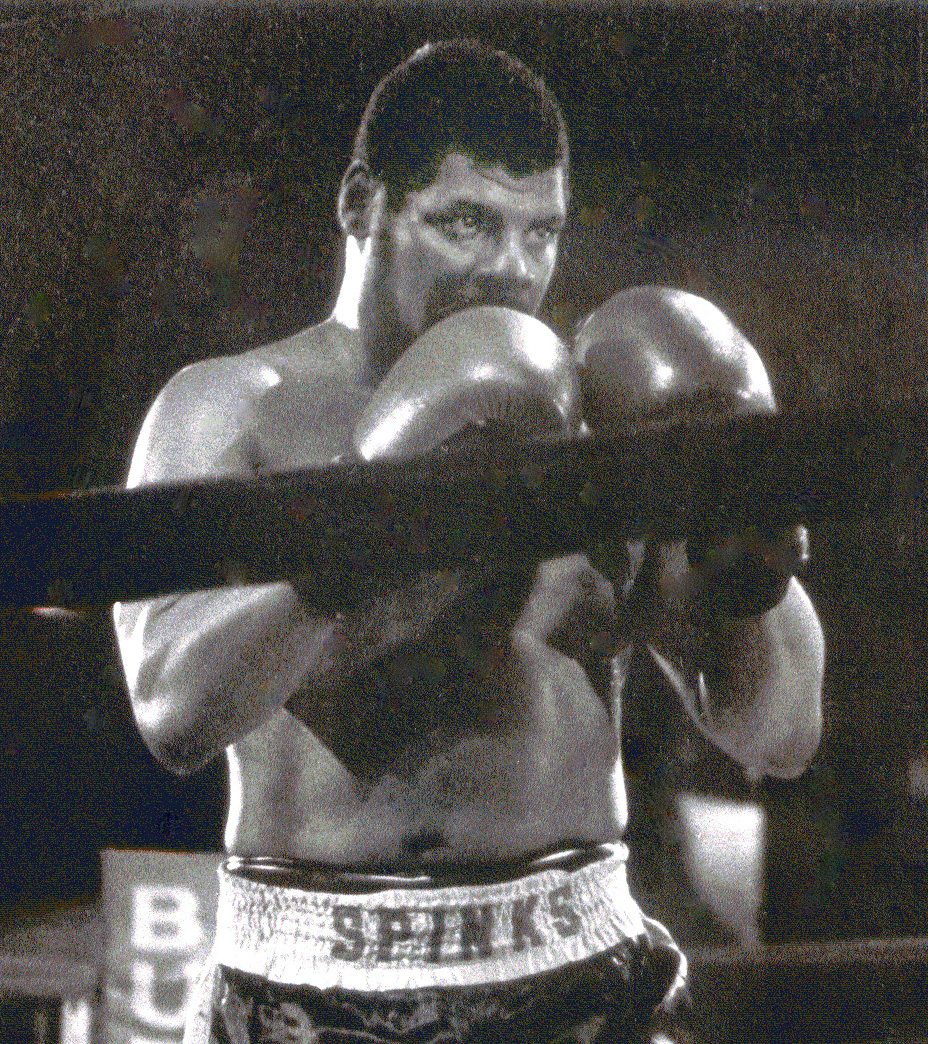
Leon Spinks

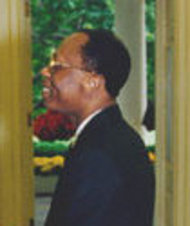
Jean Bertrand-Aristide

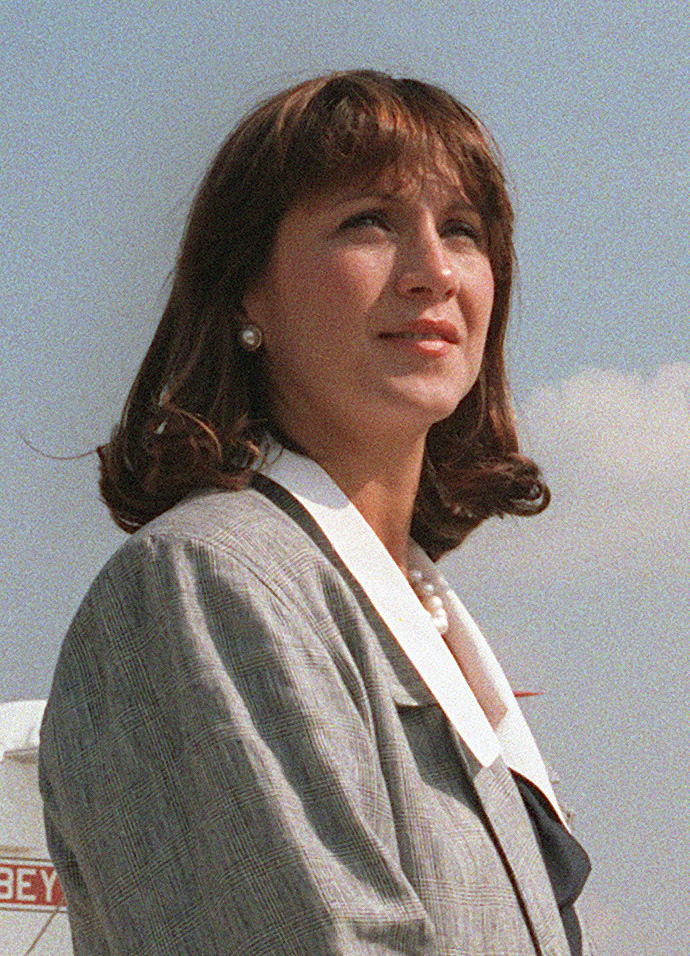
Mila Mulroney

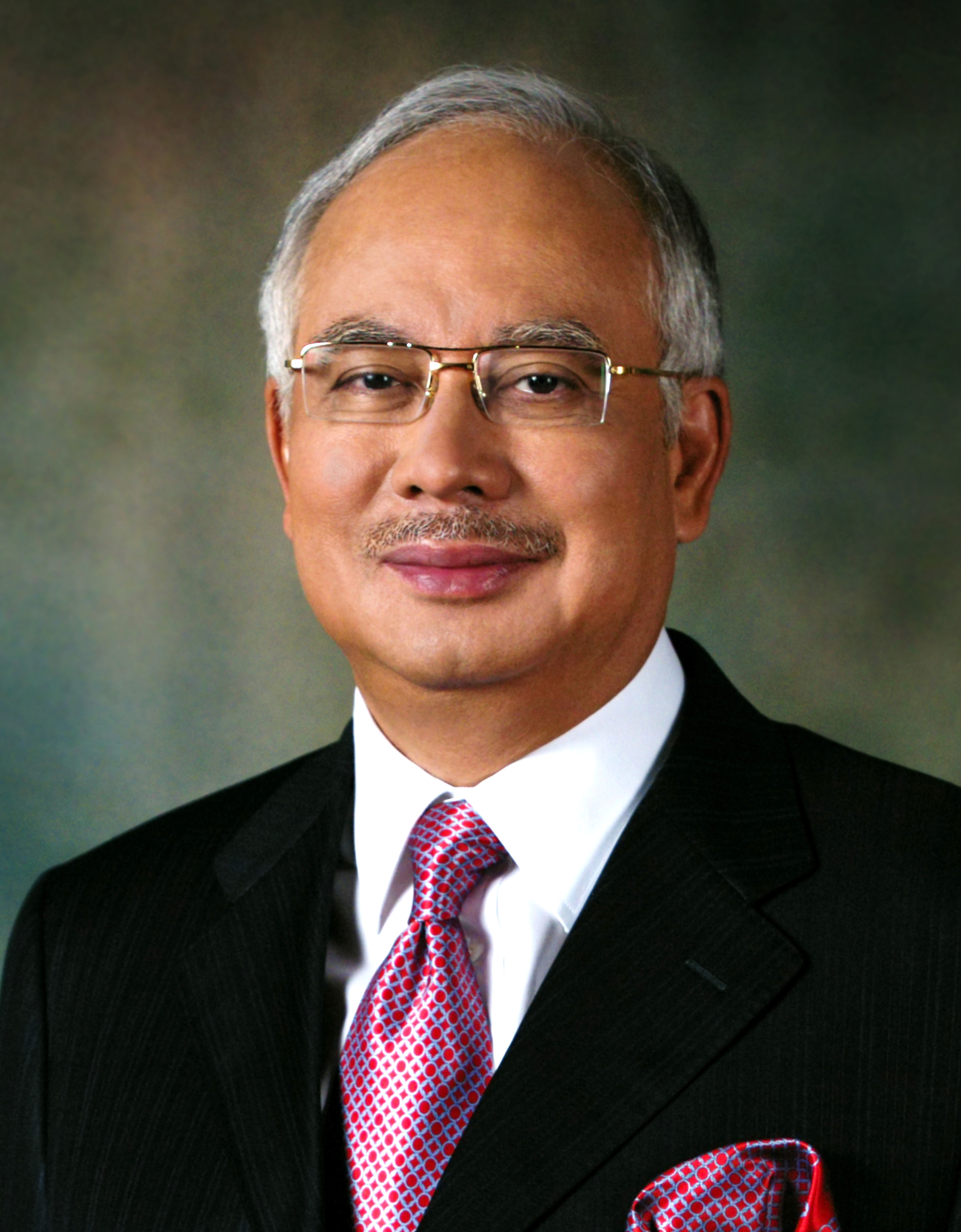
Najib Razak

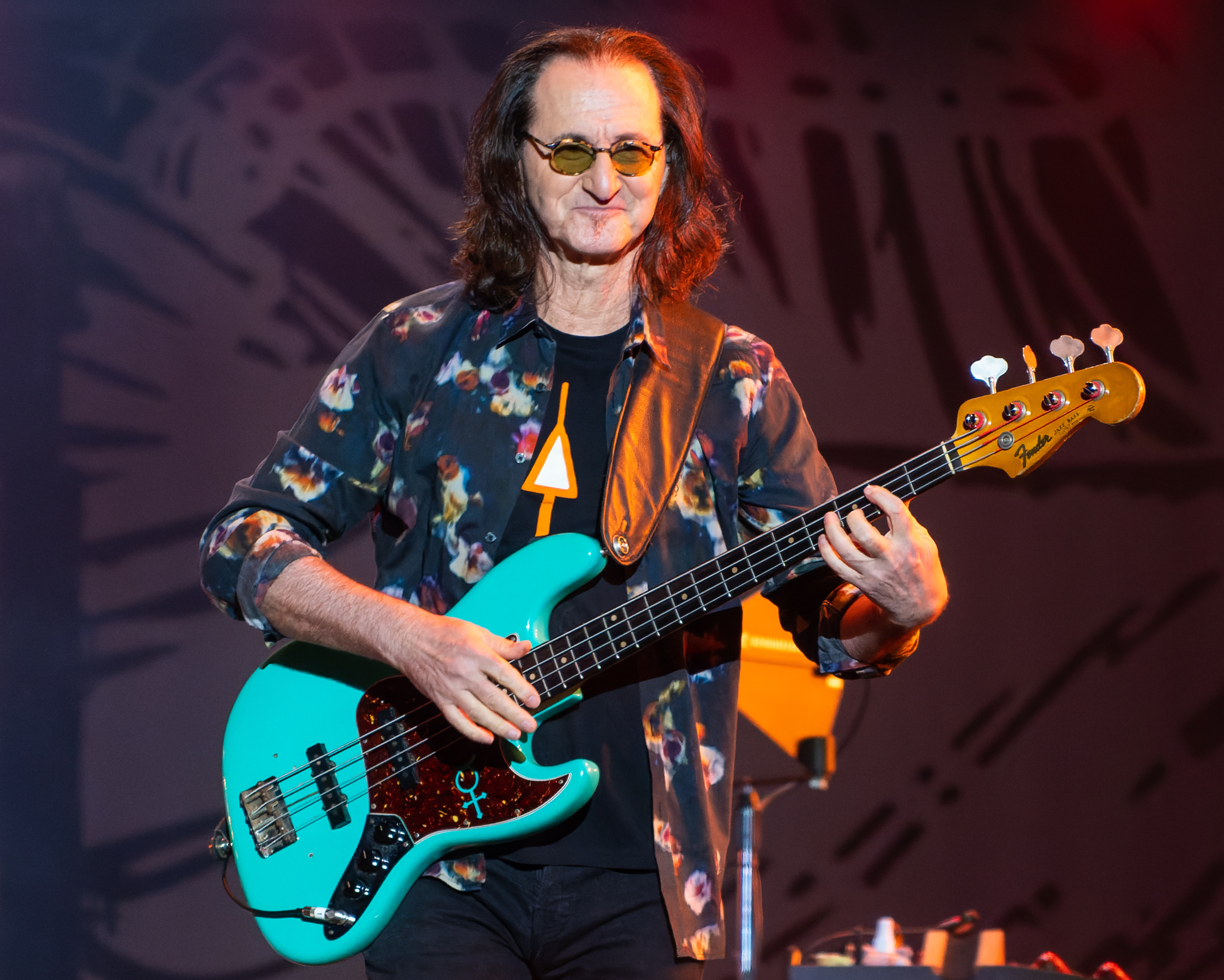
Geddy Lee

- July 1
  - Lawrence Gonzi, 11th Prime Minister of Malta
  - Jadranka Kosor, Croatian politician
  - Nasir Ali Mamun, Bengali portrait photographer
  - Sangay Ngedup, Prime Minister of Bhutan
- July 2 – Nacer Sandjak, Algerian footballer and manager
- July 3
  - Ana Botella, Spanish politician
  - Lotta Sollander, Swedish alpine skier
  - Les Strong, English association footballer
- July 11
  - Angélica Aragón, Mexican actress
  - Leon Spinks, African-American boxer (d. 2021)
  - Mindy Sterling, American actress
- July 15
  - Jean-Bertrand Aristide, President of Haiti
  - Raisul Islam Asad, Bangladeshi actor
- July 19
  - Shōichi Nakagawa, Japanese politician (d. 2009)
- July 21
  - Jeff Fatt, Australian musician, former member of The Wiggles
  - Sylvia Chang, Taiwanese actress
- July 23 – Najib Razak, 6th Prime Minister of Malaysia
- July 24
  - Tadashi Kawamata, Japanese contemporary artist
  - Claire McCaskill, U.S. Senator
- July 25 – Tim Gunn, American fashion expert
- July 27 – Yahoo Serious, Australian filmmaker
- July 29
  - Ken Burns, American documentary filmmaker
  - Geddy Lee, Canadian rock musician (Rush)
  - Patti Scialfa, American singer and guitarist
- July 31
  - Tōru Furuya, Japanese voice actor
  - James Read, American actor

=== August ===
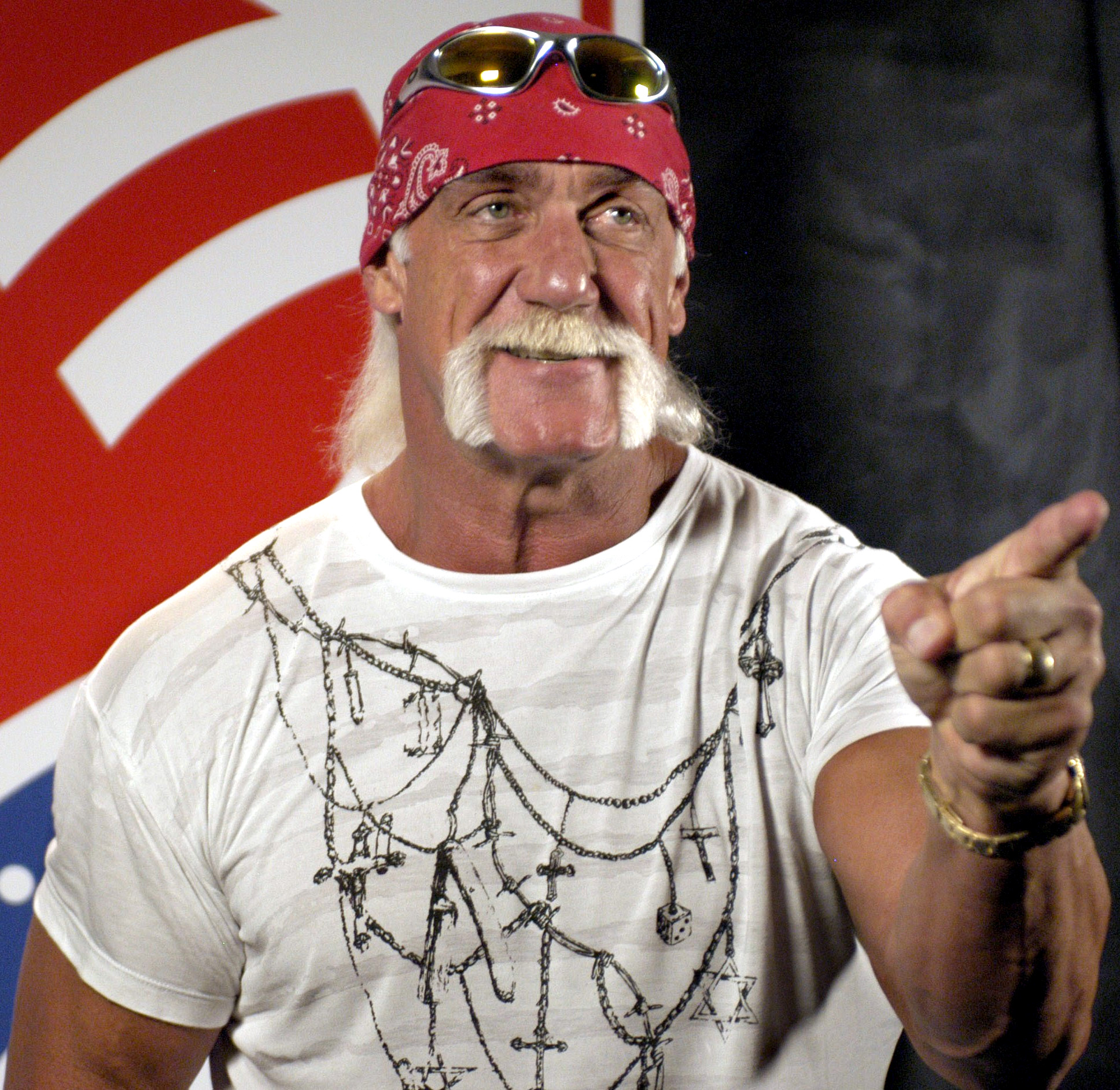
Hulk Hogan

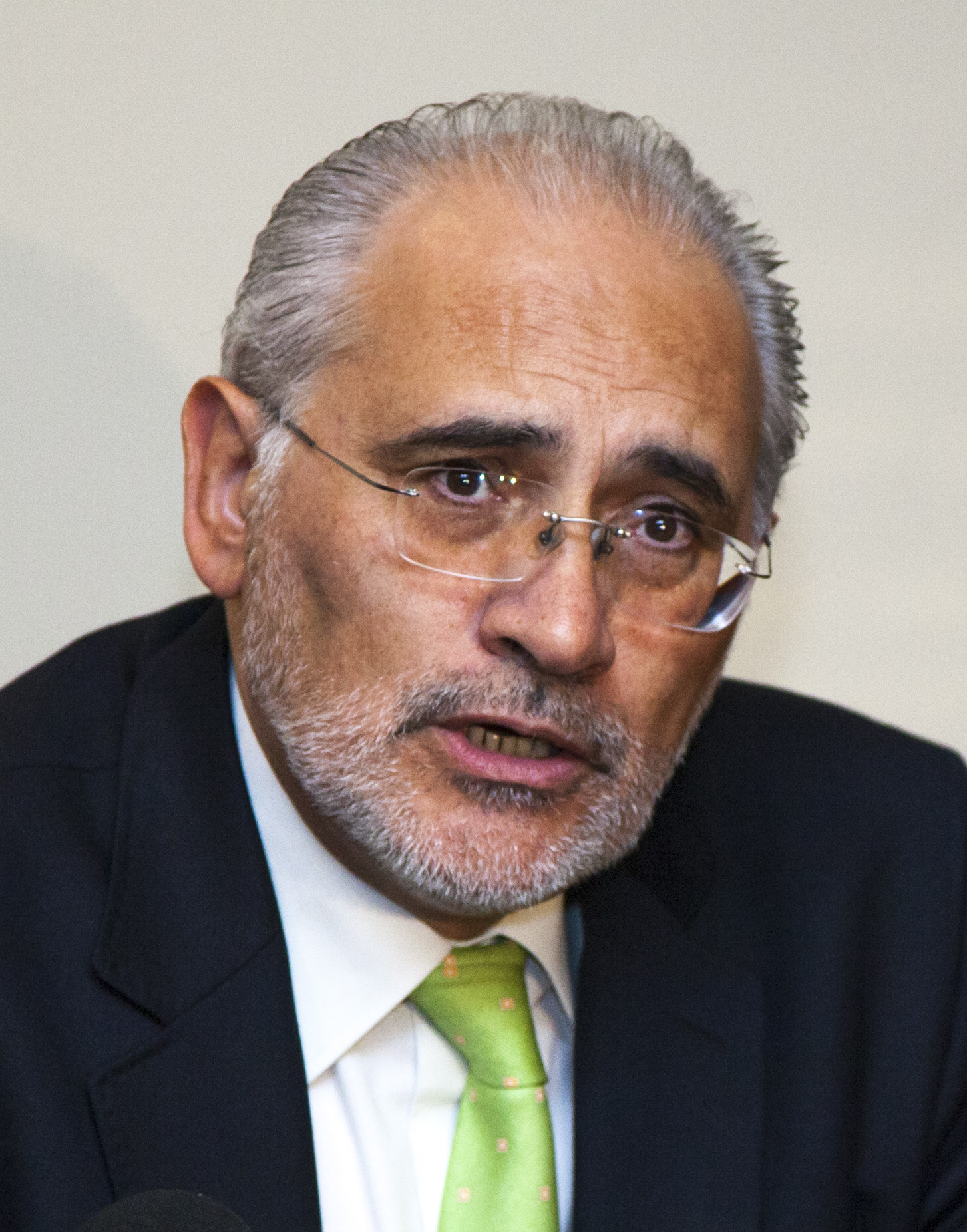
Carlos Mesa

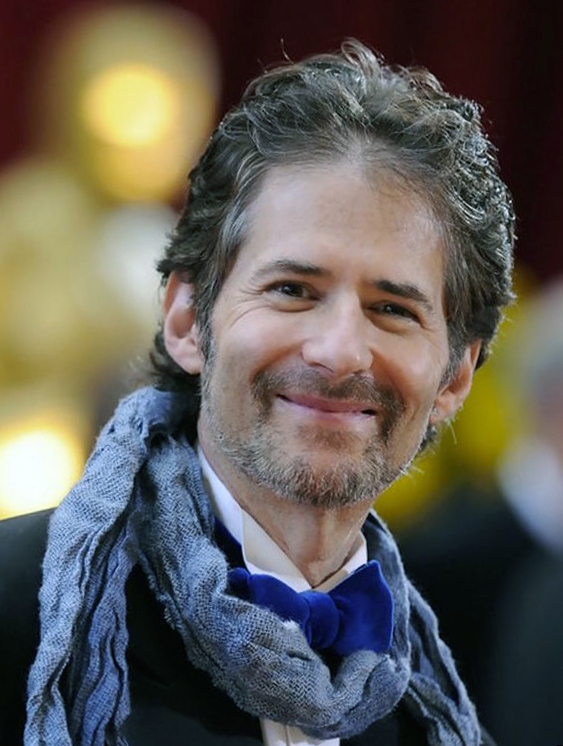
James Horner

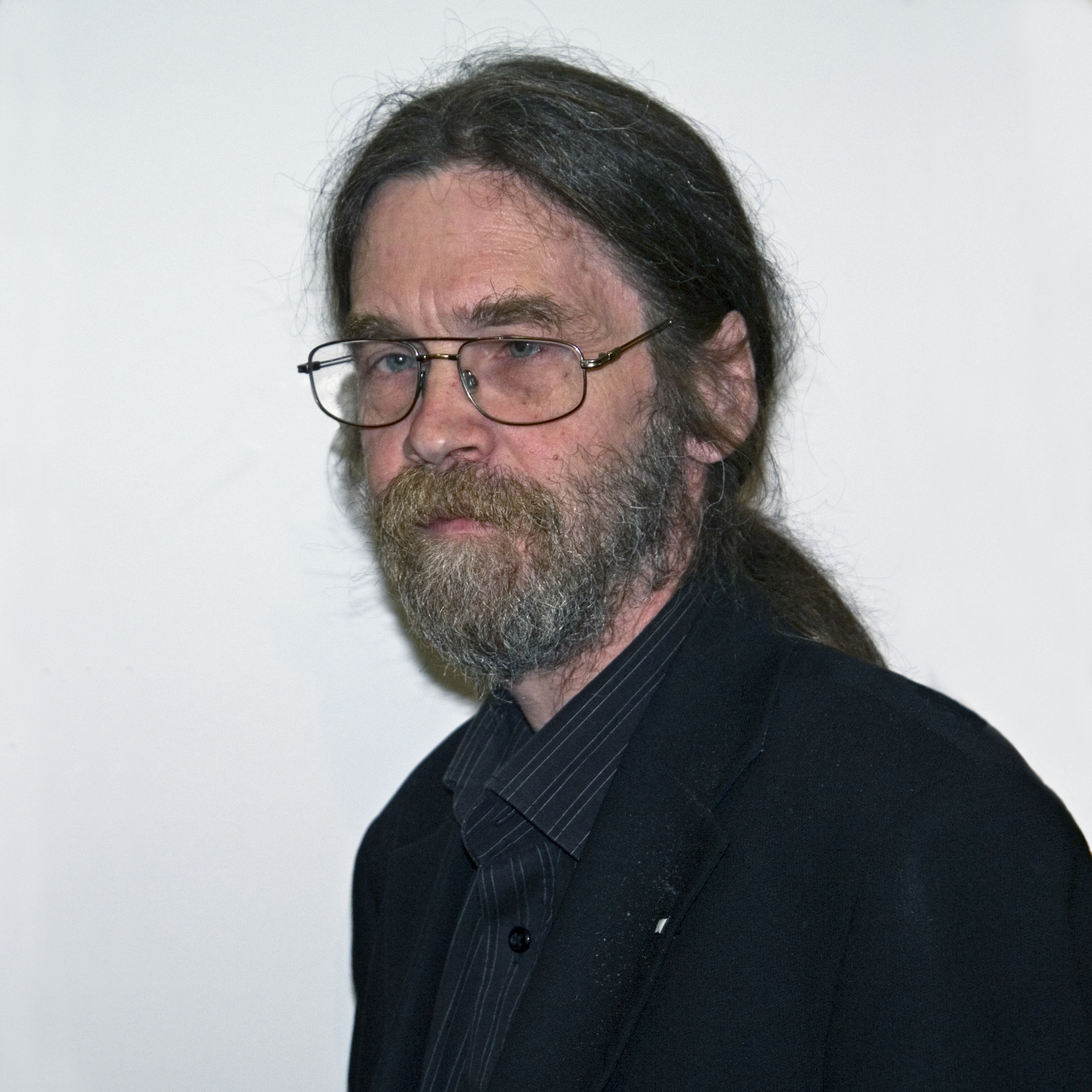
Wolfgang Hohlbein

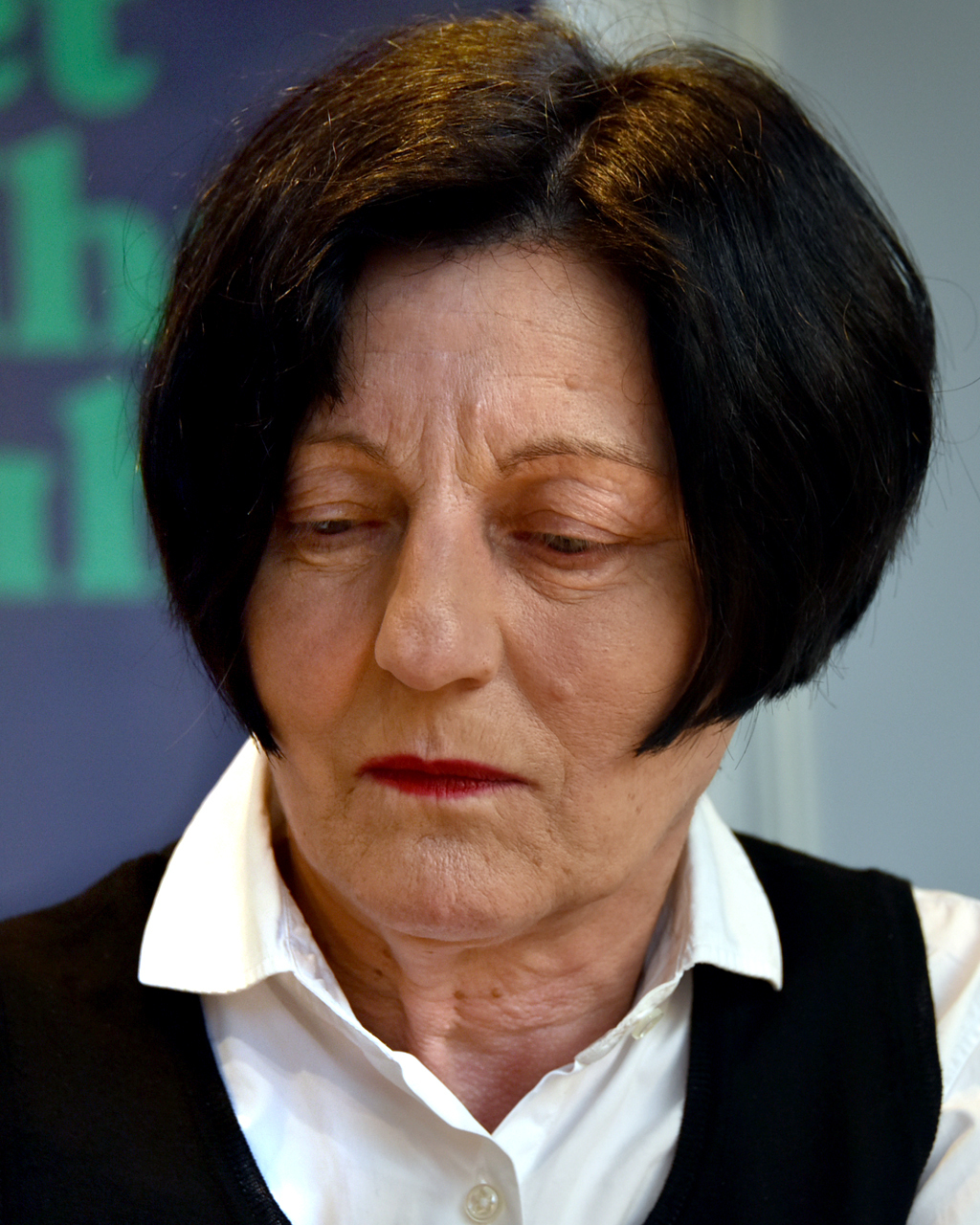
Herta Müller

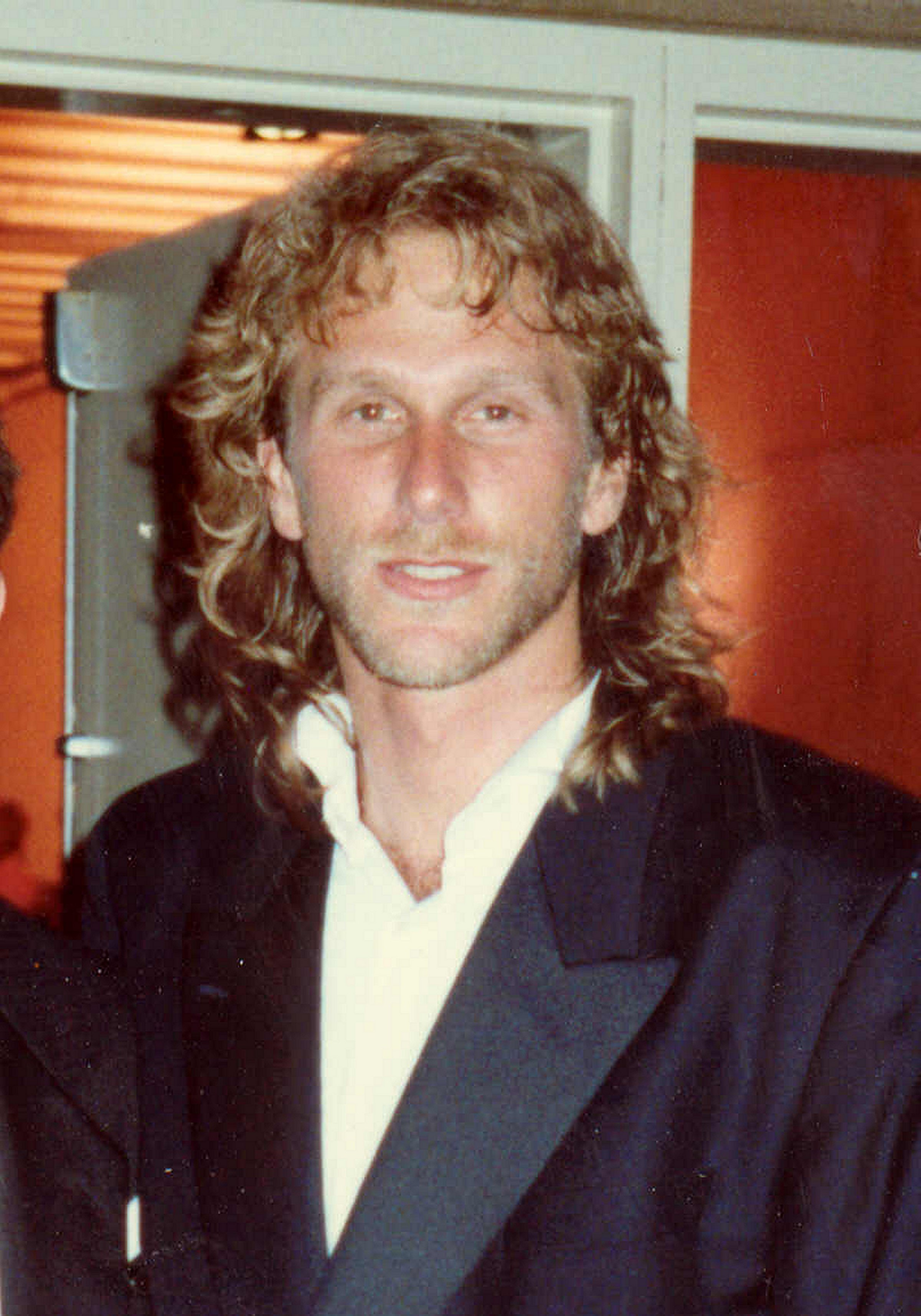
Peter Horton

- August 1
  - Robert Cray, American blues guitarist and singer
  - Steven Krasner, American sportswriter
- August 2 – Butch Patrick, American child actor and musician
- August 4 – Antonio Tajani, Italian politician, President of the European Parliament
- August 5
  - András Ligeti, Hungarian violinist and conductor (d. 2021)
  - Rick Mahler, American baseball player (d. 2005)
- August 8
  - Lloyd Austin, 28th United States Secretary of Defense
  - Nigel Mansell, English 1992 Formula 1 world champion
- August 9 – Jean Tirole, French Nobel Prize-winning economist
- August 11 – Hulk Hogan, American professional wrestler (d. 2025)
- August 12
  - Carlos Mesa, President of Bolivia
  - Teddi Siddall, American actress (d. 2018)
- August 14
  - Cliff Johnson, American game designer
  - James Horner, American film composer (d. 2015)
- August 16 – Kathie Lee Gifford, American singer and actress
- August 17 – Herta Müller, German Nobel Prize-winning writer
- August 18 – Louie Gohmert, American politician
- August 19 – Benoît Régent, French actor (d. 1994)
- August 20
  - Peter Horton, American actor and director
  - Mike Jackson, member of the Texas Senate
- August 21 – Géza Szőcs, Hungarian poet and politician (d. 2020)
- August 24
  - Georg Nagel, German Nobel Prize-winning biophysicist
  - Ron Holloway, American tenor saxophonist
- August 26
  - Edward Lowassa, 8th Prime Minister of Tanzania (d. 2024)
  - Pat Sharkey, Irish footballer
- August 27
  - Tamser Ali, member of the West Bengal Legislative Assembly
  - Alex Lifeson, Canadian rock musician (Rush)
- August 29 – James Quesada, Nicaraguan-born anthropologist
- August 30 – Robert Parish, American basketball player
- August 31 – György Károly, Hungarian author (d. 2018)

=== September ===
- September 2 – John Zorn, American musician
- September 4 – Fatih Terim, Turkish footballer and manager
- September 6 – Princess Sinaitakala ʻOfeina ʻe he Langi, Tongan royalty
- September 8 – Stu Ungar, American poker player (d. 1998)
- September 9
  - Simon Warr, British broadcaster (BBC) and actor (That'll Teach 'Em) (d. 2020)
  - Janet Fielding, Australian actress
- September 10 – Amy Irving, American actress
- September 12
  - Nan Goldin, American photographer
  - Stephen Sprouse, American fashion designer, artist and photographer (d. 2004)
- September 13 – Ann Dusenberry, American film actress
- September 16 - Colin Sinclair, Scottish Church Minister
- September 19 – Probal Dasgupta, Indian linguist and Esperantist
- September 23
  - Kaba Rougui Barry, Guinean politician
  - Alexey Maslov, commander-in-chief of the Russian Ground Forces
- September 27
  - Greg Ham, Australian rock musician (Men at Work) (d. 2012)
- September 29 – Denis Potvin, Canadian Hall of Fame hockey player

=== October ===
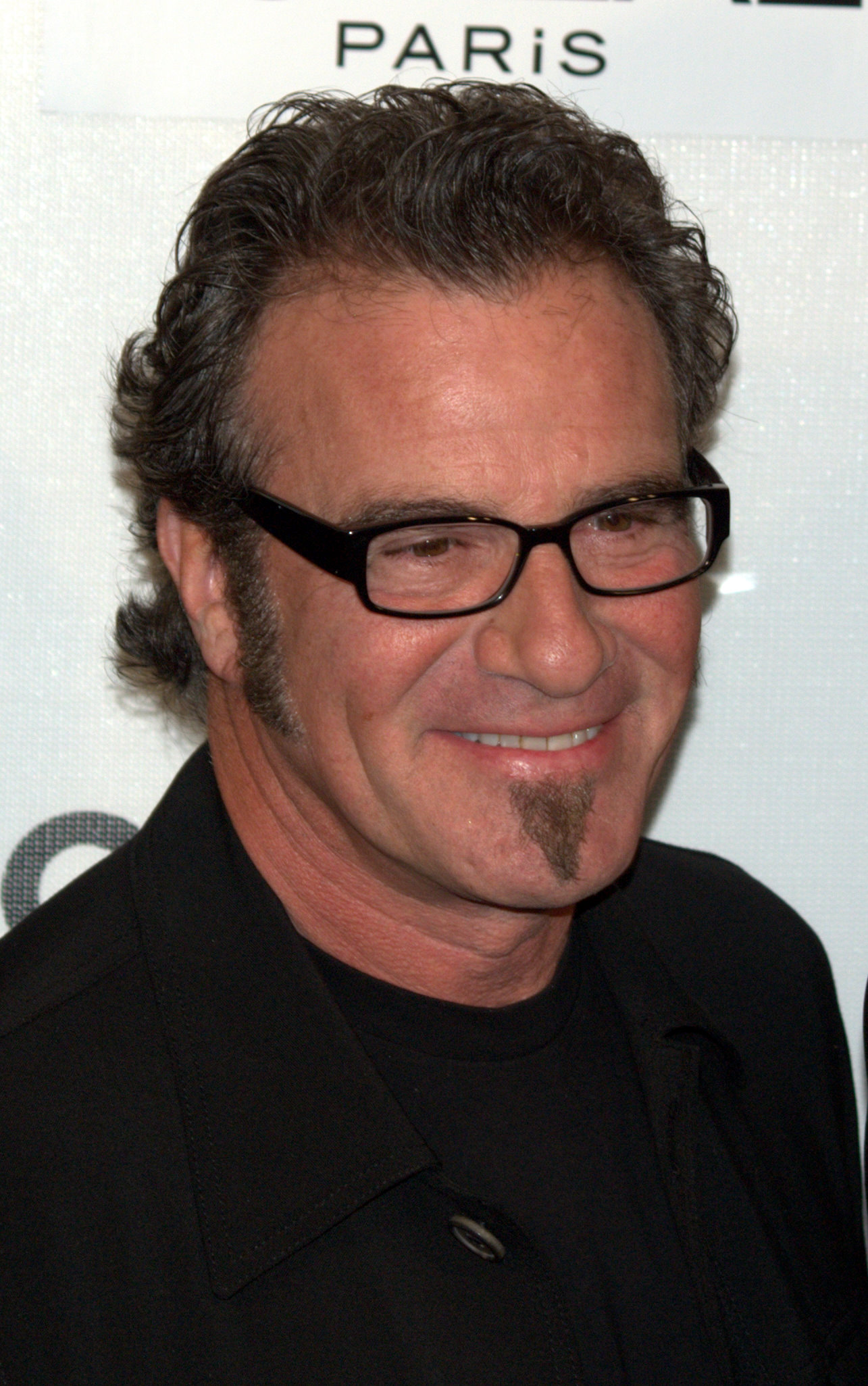
Tico Torres

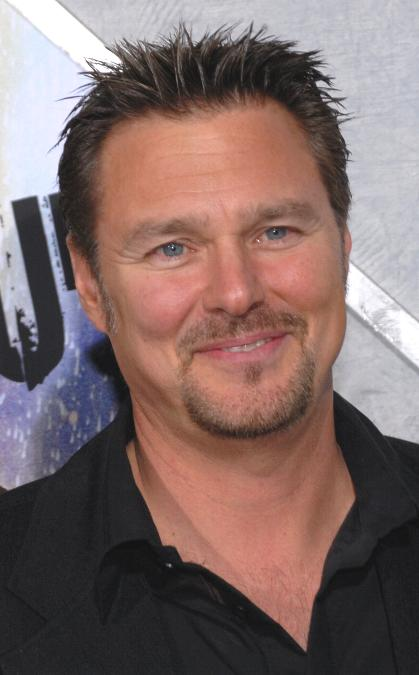
Greg Evigan

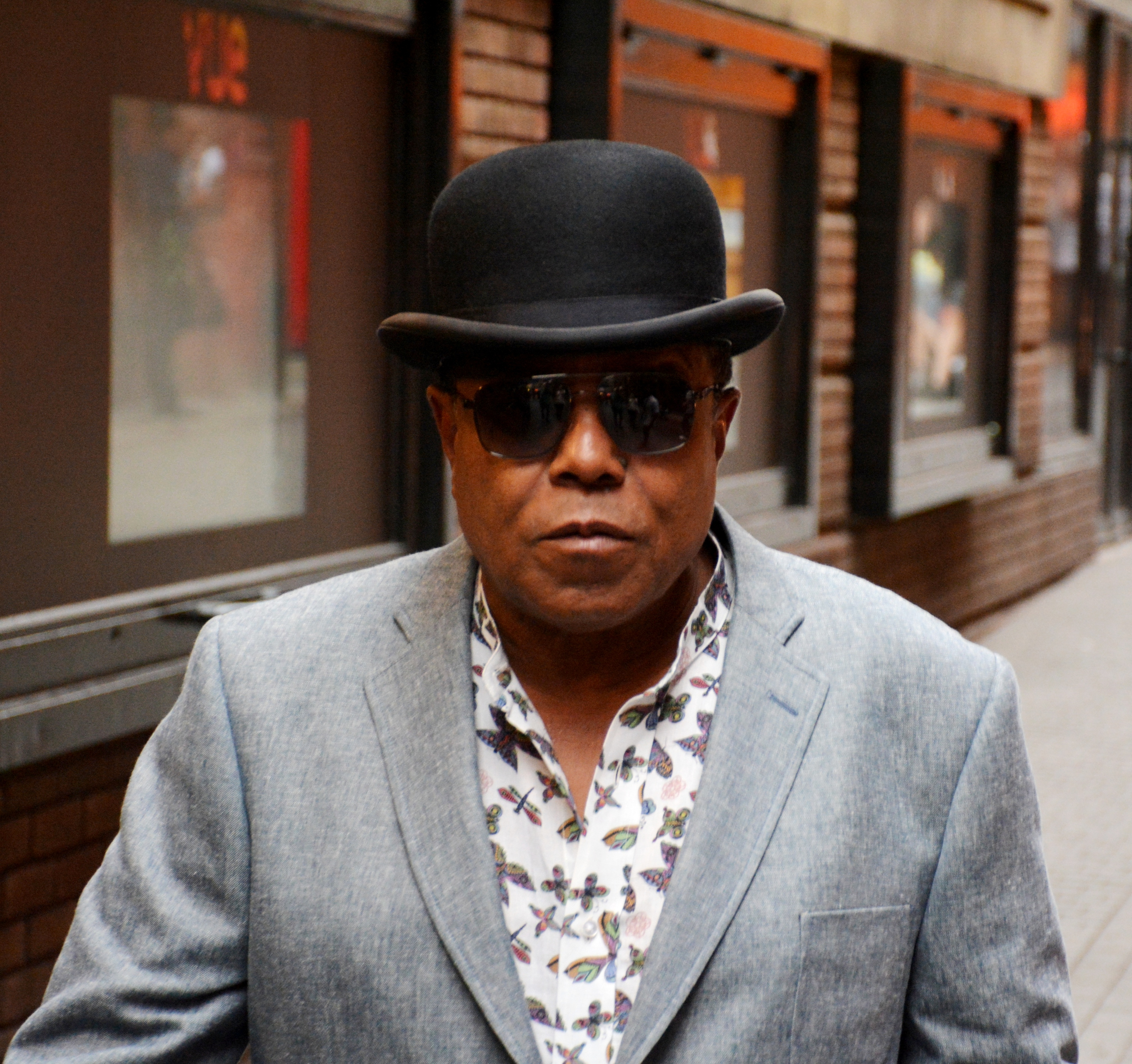
Tito Jackson

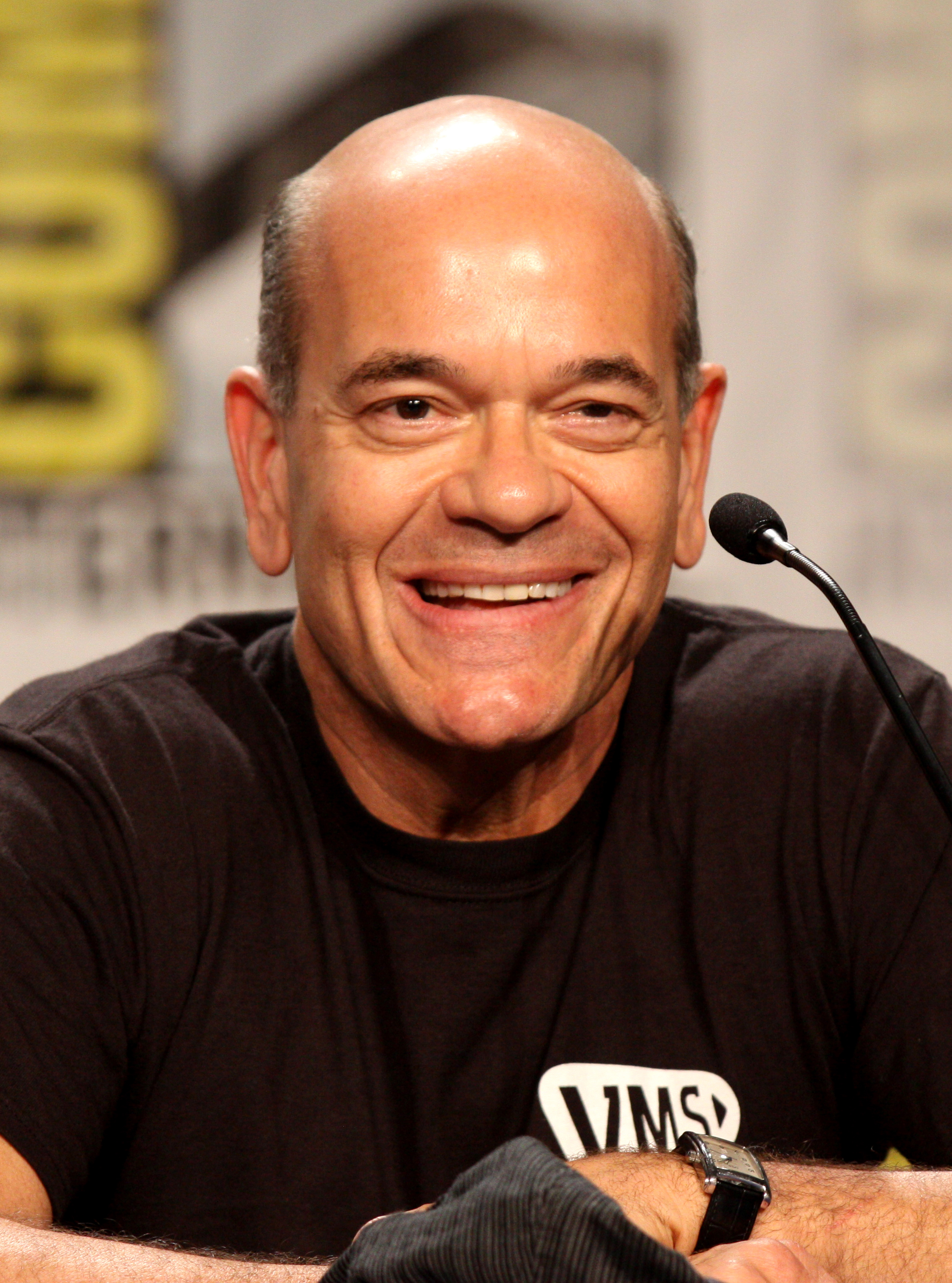
Robert Picardo

- October 1
  - Grete Waitz, Norwegian athlete (d. 2011)
  - Klaus Wowereit, German politician
- October 2 – Brandon Wilson, American author and explorer
- October 3 – Karen Bass, American politician, 43rd Mayor of Los Angeles
- October 4 – Kerry Sherman, American actress
- October 9 – Tony Shalhoub, American actor
- October 12
  - Les Dennis, British comedian and television presenter
  - Serge Lepeltier, French politician
- October 14
  - Greg Evigan, American actor
  - Shelley Ackerman, American astrologer, actress, writer (d. 2020)
- October 15
  - Tito Jackson, African-American singer and guitarist (The Jackson 5) (d. 2024)
  - Larry Miller, American actor and comedian
- October 16 – Martha Smith, American model and actress
- October 20 – Bill Nunn, American actor (d. 2016)
- October 21
  - Keith Green, American-born Christian piano player (d. 1982)
  - Peter Mandelson, British politician and member of the Labour Party
  - Hugh Wolff, American orchestral conductor
- October 22 – Loyiso Nongxa, South African mathematician
- October 24
  - Christoph Daum, German footballer and manager (d. 2024)
  - Steven Hatfill, American physician, virologist and bio-weapons expert
  - David Wright, British composer and producer, co-founder of AD Music
- October 26 – Keith Strickland, American musician (The B-52's)
- October 27
  - Paul Alcock, English football referee (d. 2018)
  - Peter Firth, British actor
  - Robert Picardo, American actor
- October 29 – Lorelei King, American-born actress
- October 31 – Michael J. Anderson, American actor

=== November ===
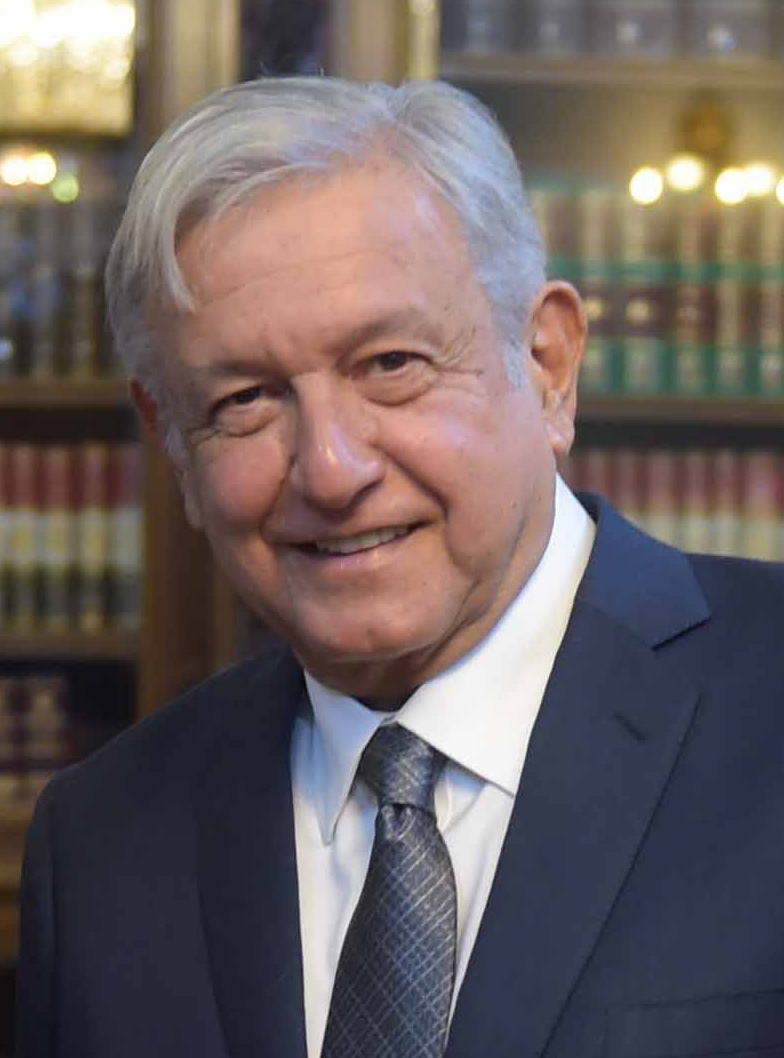
Andrés Manuel López Obrador

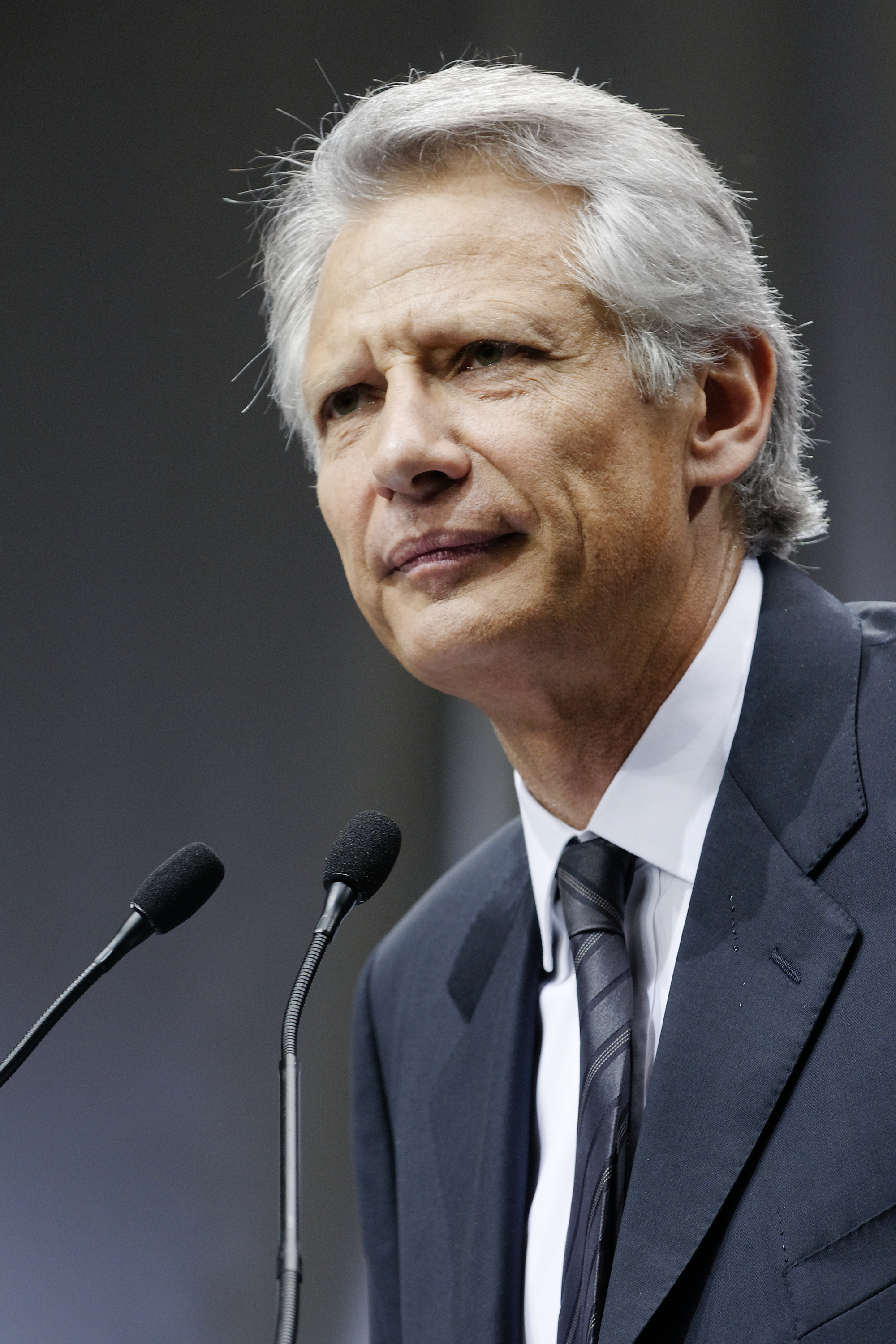
Dominique de Villepin

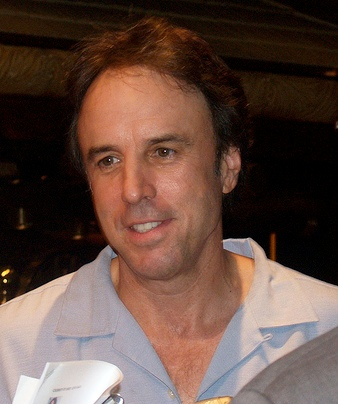
Kevin Nealon

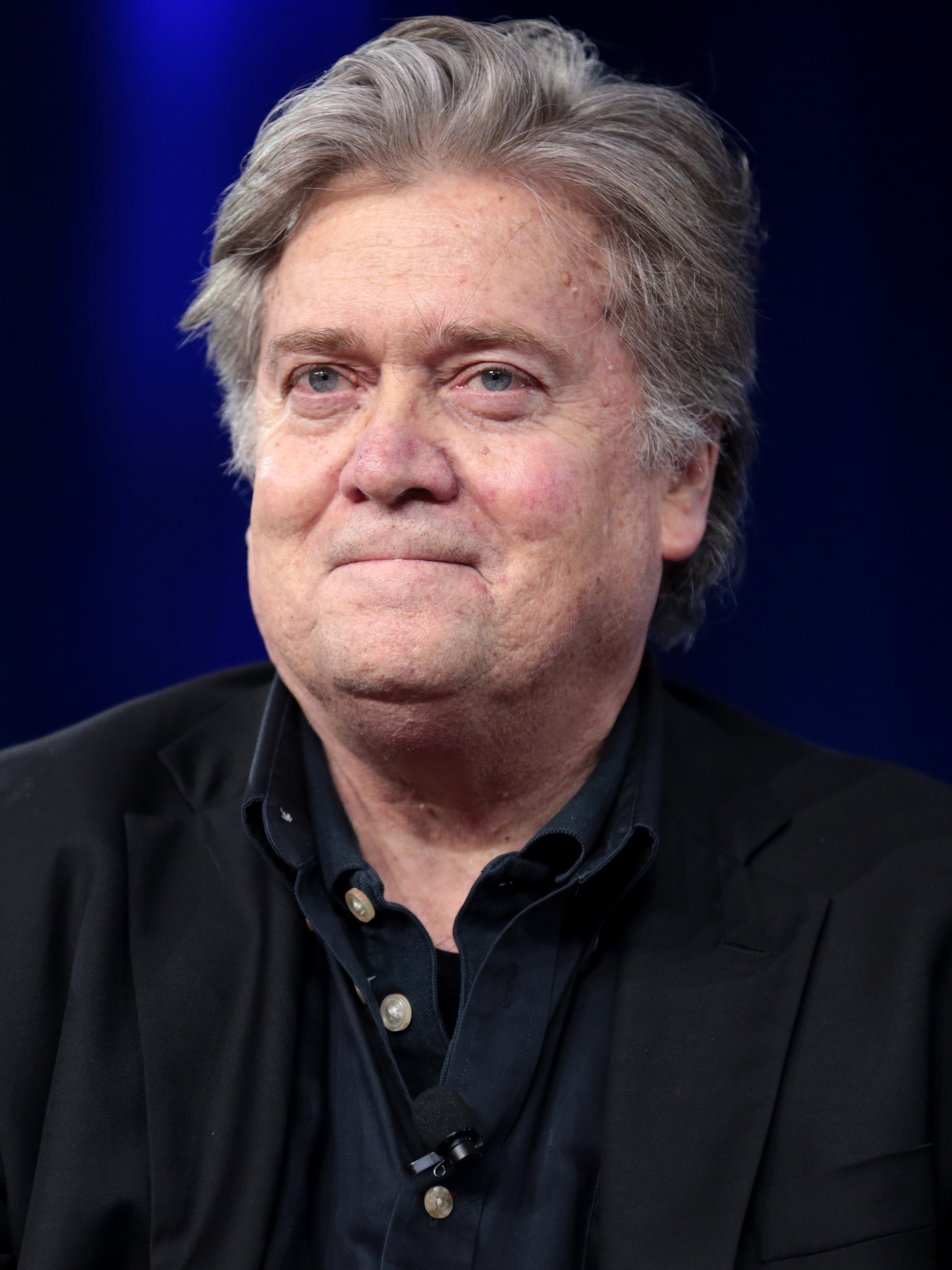
Steve Bannon

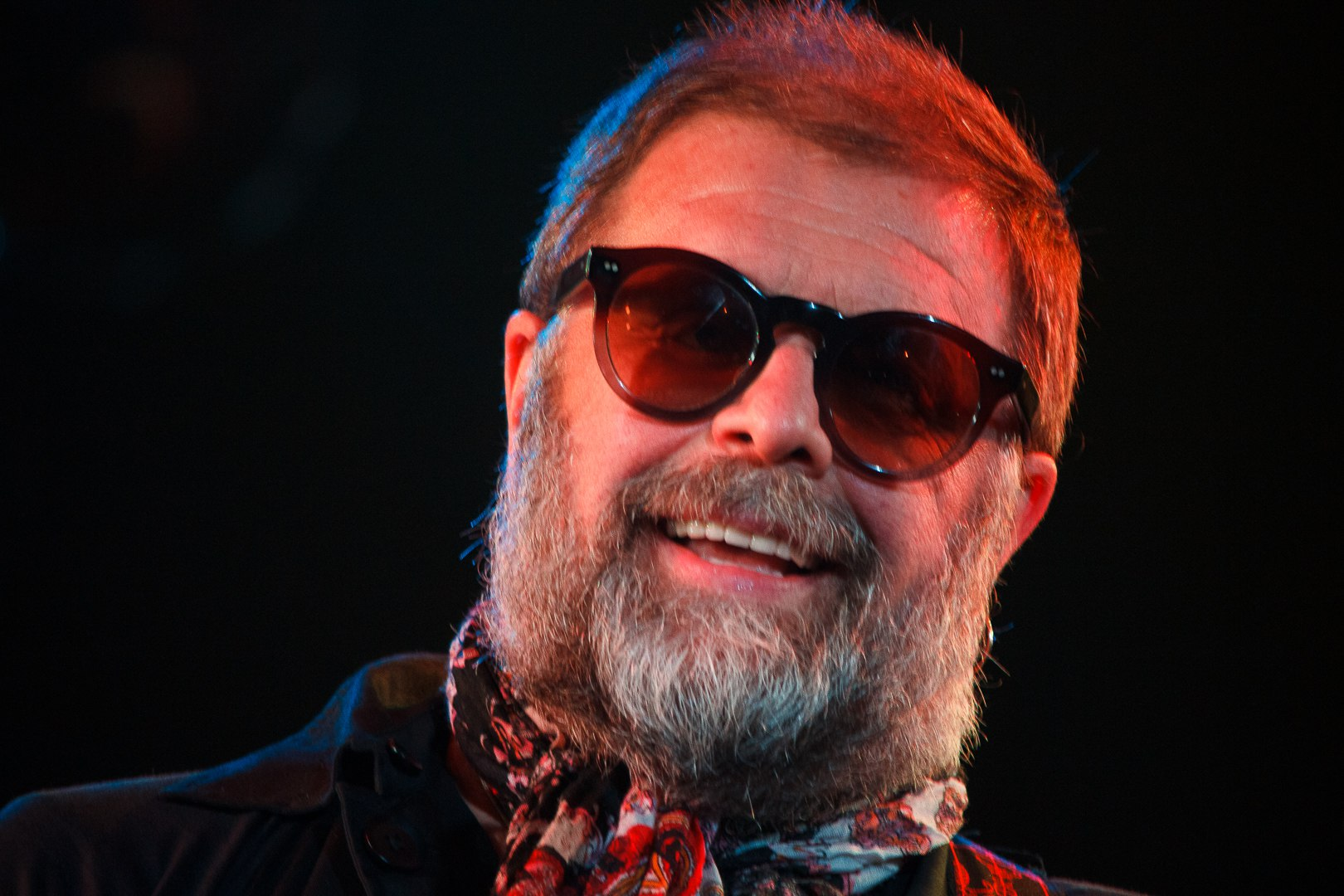
Boris Grebenshchikov

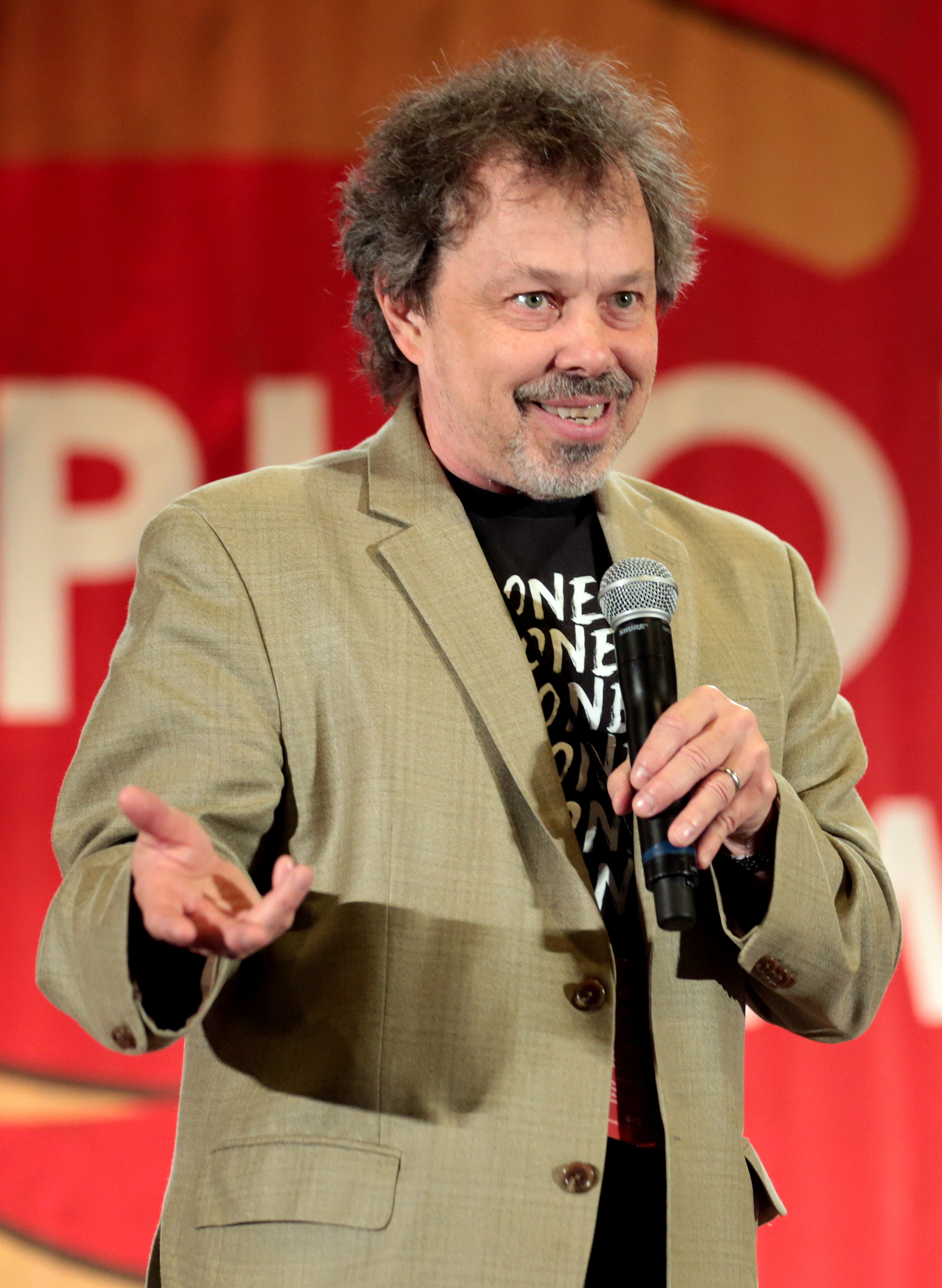
Curtis Armstrong

- November 1 – Susan Tse, Hong Kong actress and opera singer
- November 3
  - Koji Horaguchi, Japanese rugby union player (d. 1999)
  - Dennis Miller, American comedian and radio host
  - Kate Capshaw, American actress
- November 4
  - Carlos Gutierrez, American politician
  - Van Stephenson, American singer-songwriter (d. 2001)
- November 5
  - Florentino V. Floro, Filipino dwarf judge
  - Lisl Wagner-Bacher, Austrian cook
- November 7 – Ottfried Fischer, German actor and Kabarett artist
- November 8 – John Musker, American animation director
- November 11
  - Andy Partridge, British musician and frontman of the band XTC
- November 13
  - Andrés Manuel López Obrador, President of Mexico (2018–2024)
  - Waswo X. Waswo, American photographer
  - Diana Weston, Canadian-born English screen actress
  - Mokhtar Dahari, Malaysian footballer (d. 1991)
- November 14 – Dominique de Villepin, Prime Minister of France
- November 15 – Alexander O'Neal, American singer
- November 16 – Griff Rhys Jones, Welsh comedian, writer, actor and television presenter
- November 18
  - Alan Moore, English writer and magician
  - Kevin Nealon, American actor and comedian
  - Kath Soucie, American voice actress
- November 19
  - Robert Beltran, American actor
  - Tom Villard, American actor (d. 1994)
- November 23 – Francis Cabrel, French singer
- November 24
  - Glenn Withrow, American actress
  - Tod Machover, American composer
- November 25 – Graham Eadie, Australian rugby league player
- November 26 – Shelley Moore Capito, US Senator
- November 27
  - Steve Bannon, American political figure
  - Boris Grebenshchikov, Soviet and Russian rock musician
  - Curtis Armstrong, American actor
- November 28
  - Pamela Hayden, American voice actress
  - Taeko Onuki, Japanese songwriter
- November 29
  - Alex Grey, American artist
  - Vlado Kreslin, Slovenian singer
  - Christine Pascal, French actress, director and screenwriter (d. 1996)
  - Rosemary West, British serial killer
- November 30 – June Pointer, American singer (The Pointer Sisters) (d. 2006)

=== December ===
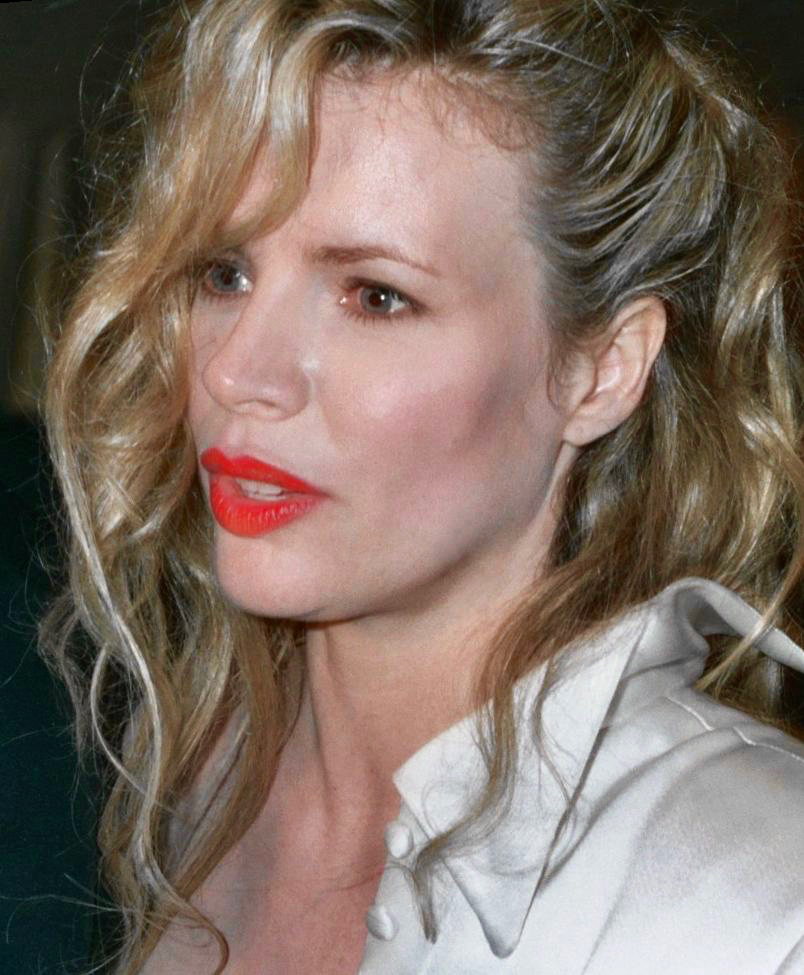
Kim Basinger

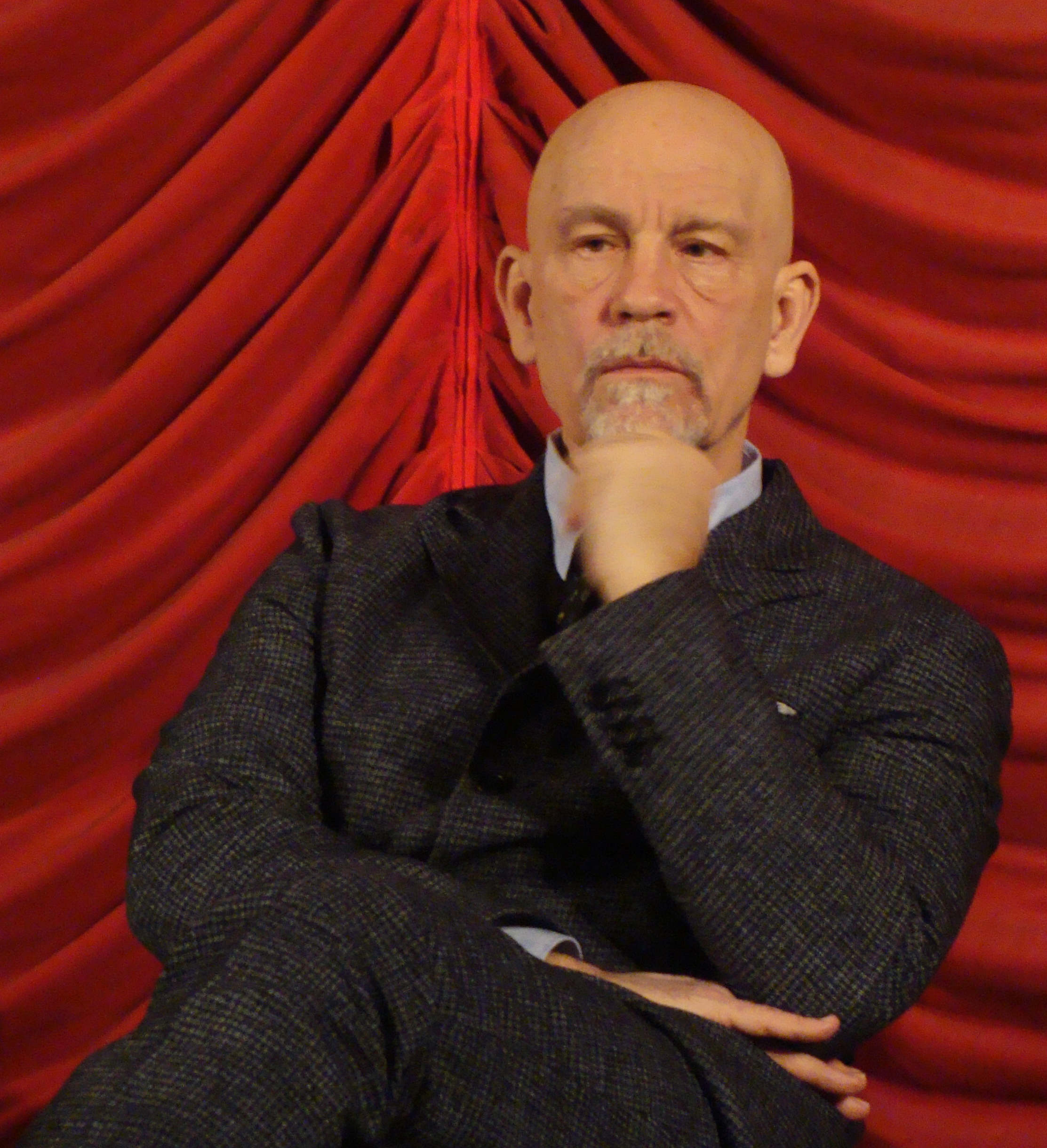
John Malkovich

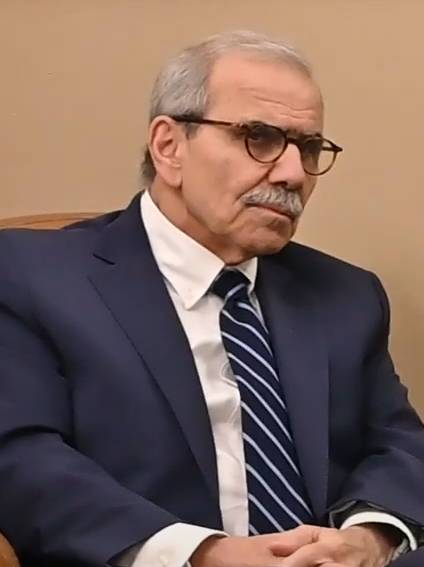
Nawaf Salam

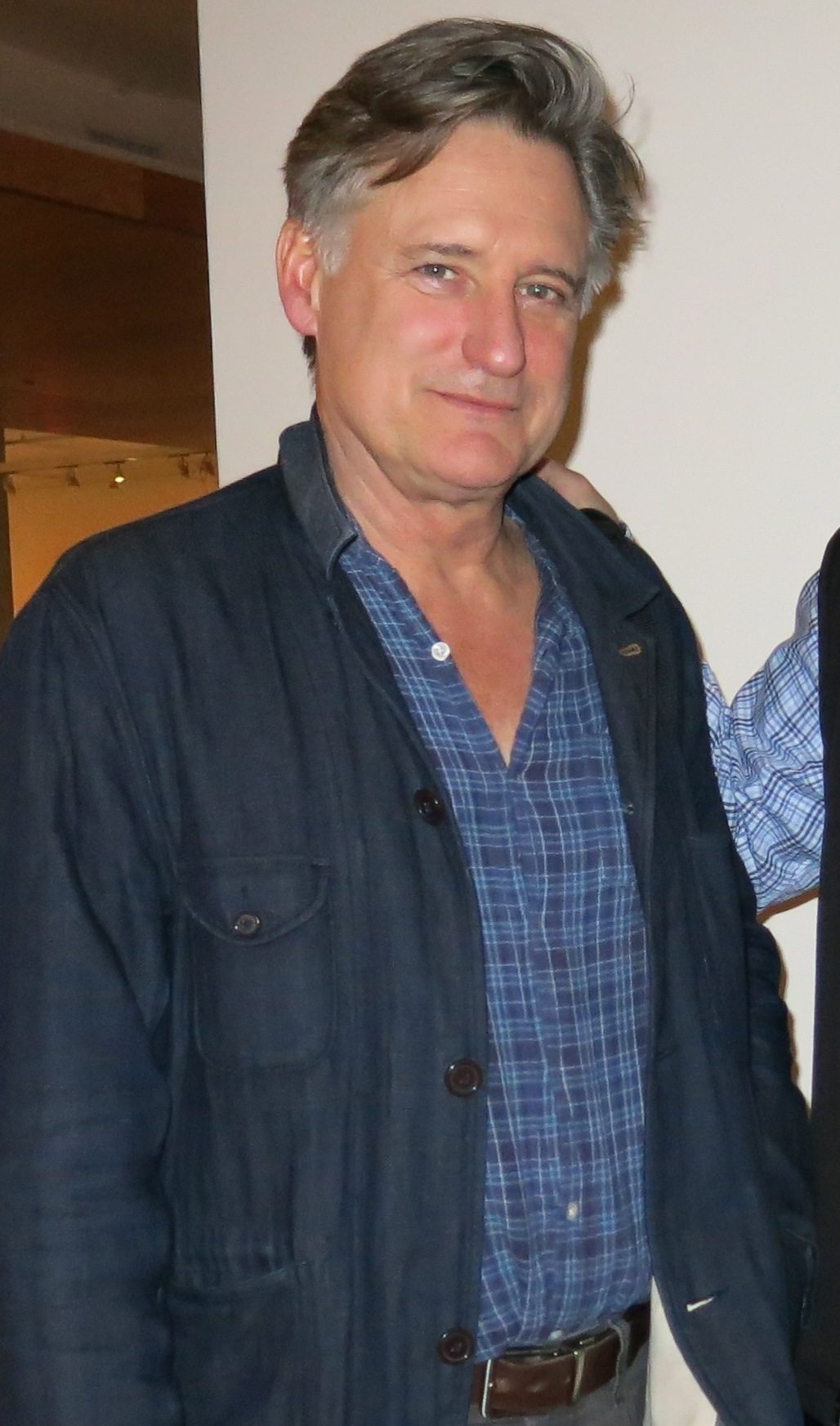
Bill Pullman

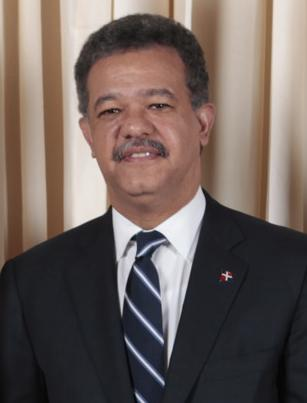
Leonel Fernández

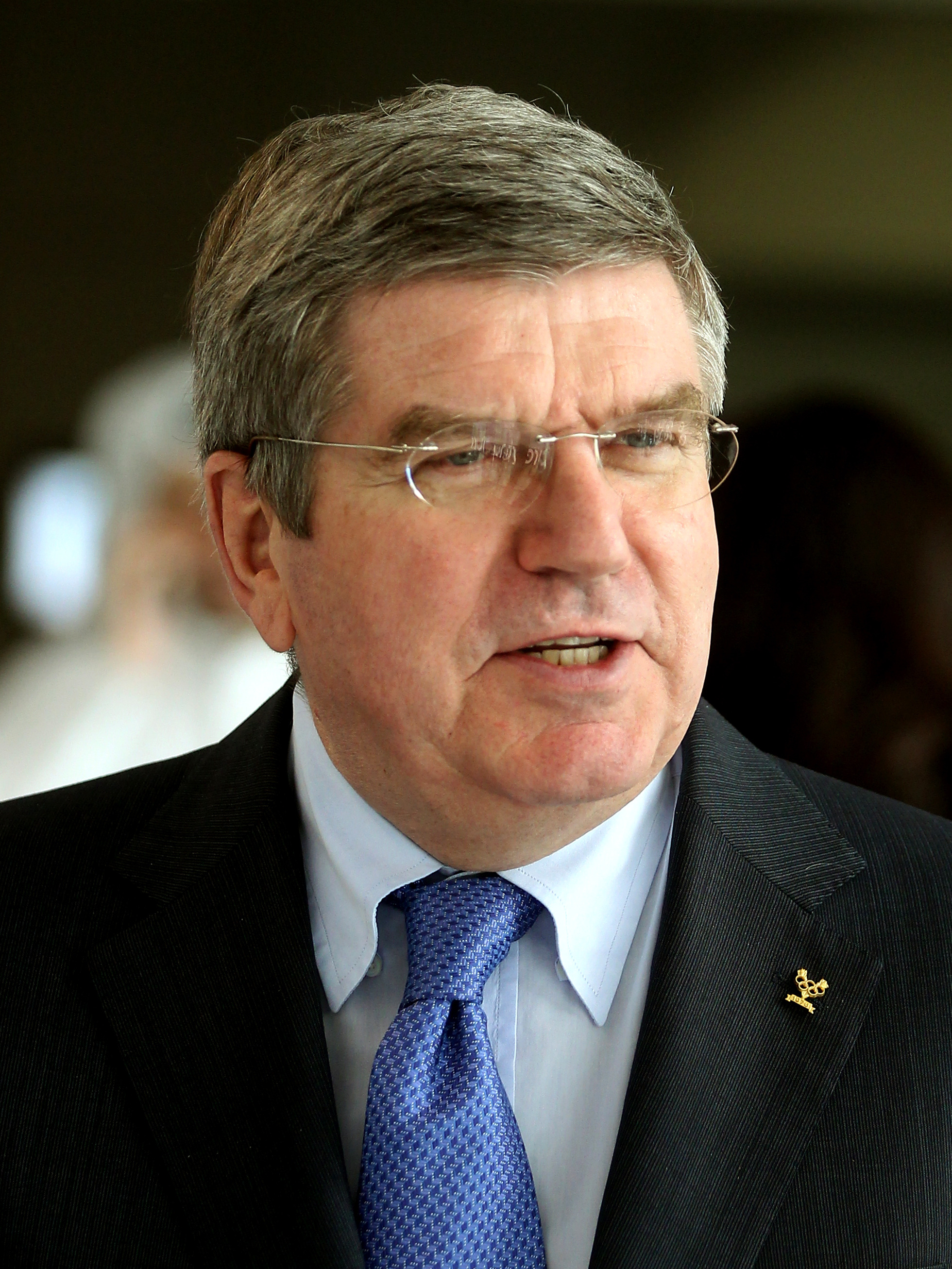
Thomas Bach

- December 2
  - Joel Fuhrman, American certified family physician
  - Pertti Sveholm, Finnish actor
- December 6
  - Geoff Hoon, British Labour Party politician
  - Tom Hulce, American actor and theater producer
  - Gary Ward, American baseball player
- December 8
  - Kim Basinger, American actress and fashion model
  - Norman G. Finkelstein, American political scientist
  - Sam Kinison, American comedian (d. 1992)
- December 9 – John Malkovich, American actor and film director
- December 12 – Bruce Kulick, American guitarist
- December 13
  - Ben Bernanke, American economist, Federal Reserve System chairman
  - Bob Gainey, Canadian hockey player
- December 14 – Vangelis Meimarakis, Greek lawyer and politician, 4th Greek Minister for National Defence
- December 15 – Nawaf Salam, Lebanese politician jurist and academic, Prime Minister of Lebanon (2025–present)
- December 17
  - Ikue Mori, Japanese drummer, composer and graphic designer
  - Bill Pullman, American actor
- December 18
  - Kevin Beattie, English footballer (d. 2018)
  - Khas-Magomed Hadjimuradov, Chechen bard
- December 21 – András Schiff, Hungarian concert pianist and conductor
- December 23 – Nuria Bages, Mexican stage and television actress
- December 24 – Timothy Carhart, American actor
- December 26
  - Leonel Fernández, President of the Dominican Republic
  - Toomas Hendrik Ilves, Estonian politician, 4th President of Estonia
- December 27 – Gina Lopez, Filipino environmentalist and philanthropist (d. 2019)
- December 29
  - Thomas Bach, 9th President of the International Olympic Committee
  - Stanley Williams, American reformed murderer (d. 2005)
- December 31 – James Remar, American actor

=== Date unknown ===
- Ely Ould Mohamed Vall, 6th President of Mauritania (d. 2017)
- Dan Petrescu, Romanian businessman and billionaire

== Deaths ==
=== January ===
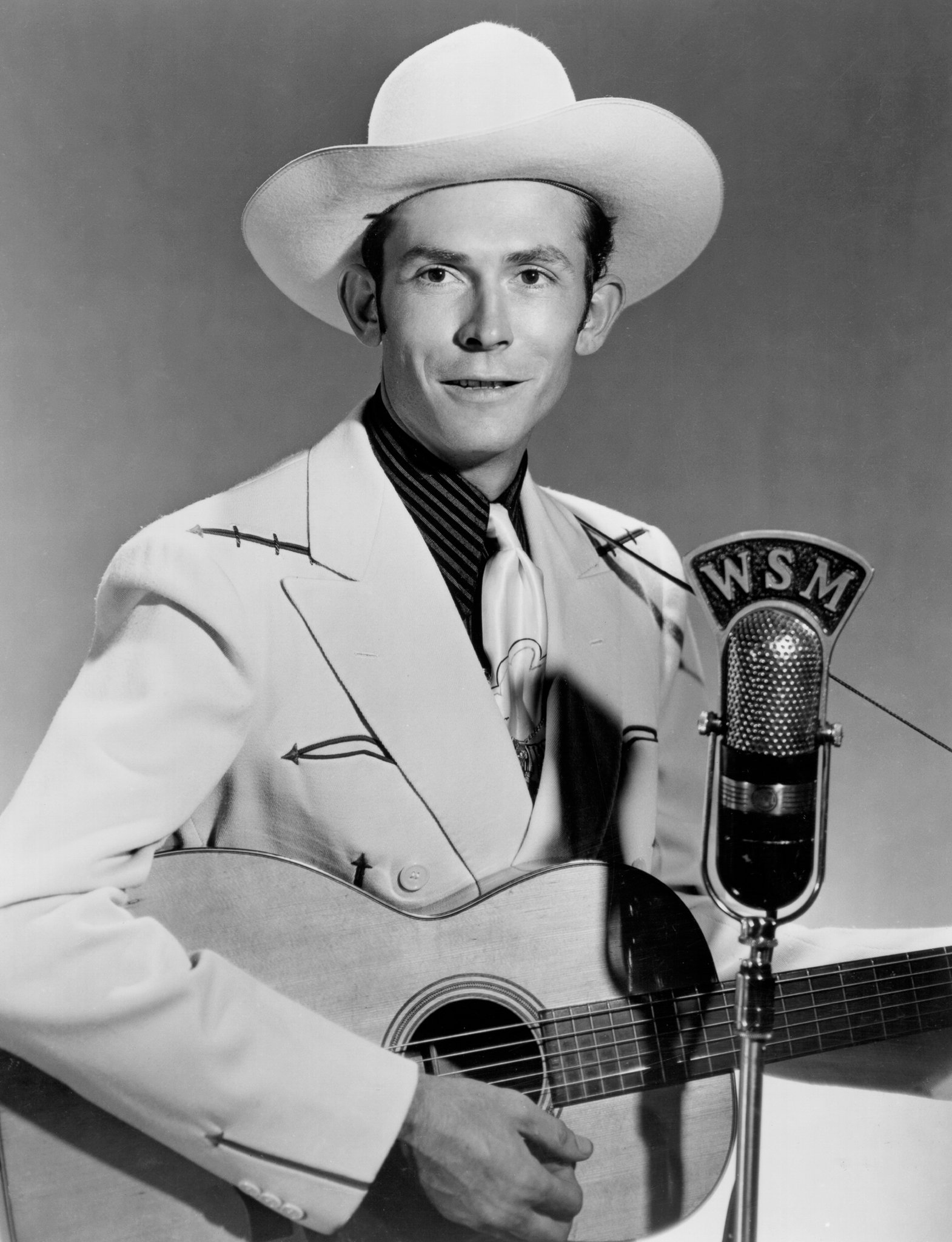
Hank Williams

- January 1 – Hank Williams, American singer-songwriter and musician (b. 1923)
- January 2 – Guccio Gucci, founder of Gucci (b. 1881)
- January 4
  - Arthur Hoyt, American actor (b. 1874)
  - Yasuhito, Prince Chichibu, Japanese prince (b. 1902)
- January 8 – Charles Edward Merriam, American political scientist (b. 1874)
- January 28 – James Scullin, 9th Prime Minister of Australia (b. 1876)
- January 29 – Sir Reginald Wingate, British army general and colonial administrator (b. 1861)
- January 30 – Lionel Belmore, English actor (b. 1867)

=== February ===
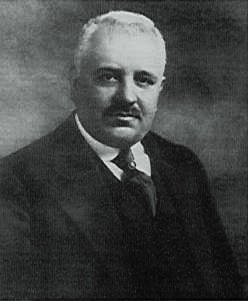
Francesco Saverio Nitti

- February 2 – Alan Curtis, American actor (b. 1909)
- February 5 – Iuliu Maniu, 32nd Prime Minister of Romania (b. 1873)
- February 9 – Cecil Hepworth, English director (b. 1874)
- February 12 – Hal Colebatch, Australian politician (b. 1872)
- February 16 – James L. Kraft, Canadian-American entrepreneur, inventor (b. 1874)
- February 19 – Nobutake Kondō, Japanese admiral (b. 1886)
- February 20 – Francesco Saverio Nitti, Italian economist and political figure, 24th Prime Minister of Italy (b. 1868)
- February 21 – Konrad Krafft von Dellmensingen, Bavarian general (b. 1862)
- February 24 – Gerd von Rundstedt, German field marshal (b. 1875)
- February 25 – Sergei Winogradsky, Russian scientist (b. 1856)
- February 27 – Paul Hurst, American actor (b. 1888)

=== March ===
Joseph Stalin

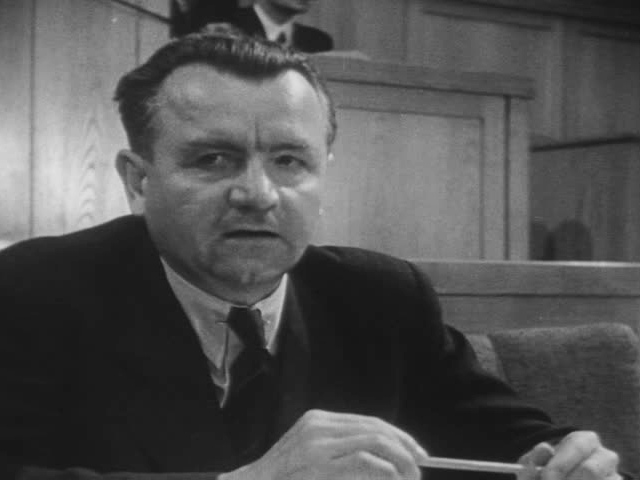
Klement Gottwald

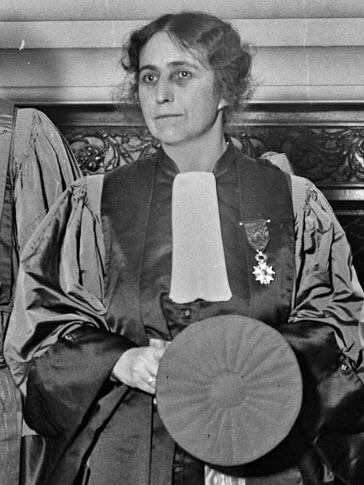
Pauline Ramart

- March 2 – Jim Lightbody, American middle-distance runner (b. 1882)
- March 3 – James J. Jeffries, American boxing champion (b. 1875)
- March 5
  - Herman J. Mankiewicz, American writer and producer (b. 1897)
  - Sergei Prokofiev, Soviet and Russian composer (b. 1891)
  - Joseph Stalin, Soviet leader (b. 1878)
- March 7 – Edward Sedgwick, American director (b. 1892)
- March 13 – Johan Laidoner, Commander-in-chief of the Estonian Army (b. 1884)
- March 14 – Klement Gottwald, 5th President of Czechoslovakia (b. 1896)
- March 15 – Carl Stockdale, American actor (b. 1874)
- March 17 - Pauline Ramart, French chemist and politician (b. 1880)
- March 20 – Graciliano Ramos, Brazilian writer (b. 1892)
- March 21 – Toni Wolff, Swiss psychoanalyst (b. 1888)
- March 22 – Gustav Herglotz, German mathematician (b. 1881)
- March 23
  - Raoul Dufy, French painter (b. 1875)
  - Oskar Luts, Estonian writer and playwright (b. 1887)
- March 24
  - Mary of Teck, consort of George V of the United Kingdom (b. 1867)
  - Paul Couturier, French priest (b. 1881)
- March 28 – Jim Thorpe, Native-American athlete, Olympic medalist and professional baseball player (b. 1887)
- March 31 – Ivan Lebedeff, Russian actor (b. 1895)

=== April ===
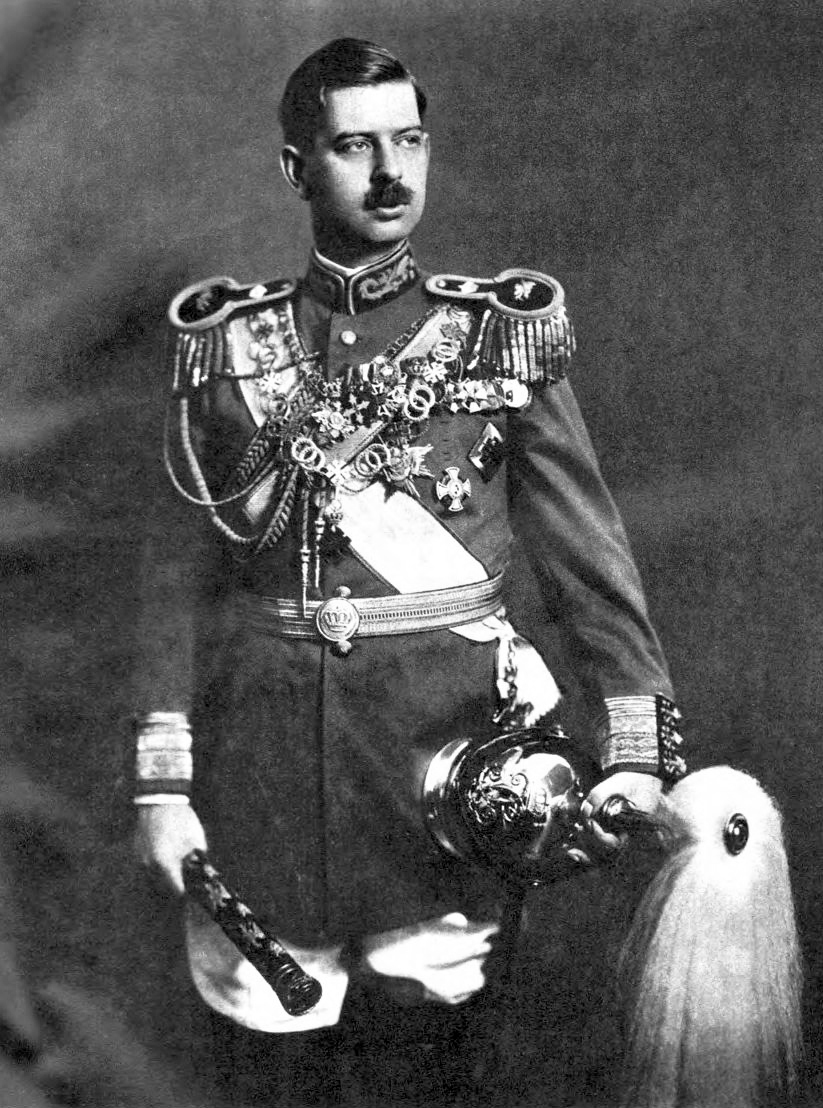
King Carol II of Romania

- April 2
  - Jean Epstein, French film director (b. 1897)
  - Hugo Sperrle, German field marshal (b. 1885)
- April 4
  - King Carol II of Romania (b. 1893)
  - Rachilde, French author (b. 1860)
- April 9
  - Hans Reichenbach, German philosopher (b. 1891)
  - Stanisław Wojciechowski, 2nd President of the Republic of Poland (b. 1869)
- April 11
  - Boris Kidrič, 1st Prime Minister of Slovenia (b. 1912)
  - Timothy Detudamo, Nauruan Head Chief (b. 1888)
- April 12 – Lionel Logue, Australian speech and language therapist (b. 1880)
- April 27 – Maud Gonne, English-born Irish republican revolutionary, memoirist; spouse of John MacBride (b. 1866)
- April 29 – Alice Prin, French artists' model (b. 1901)

=== May ===
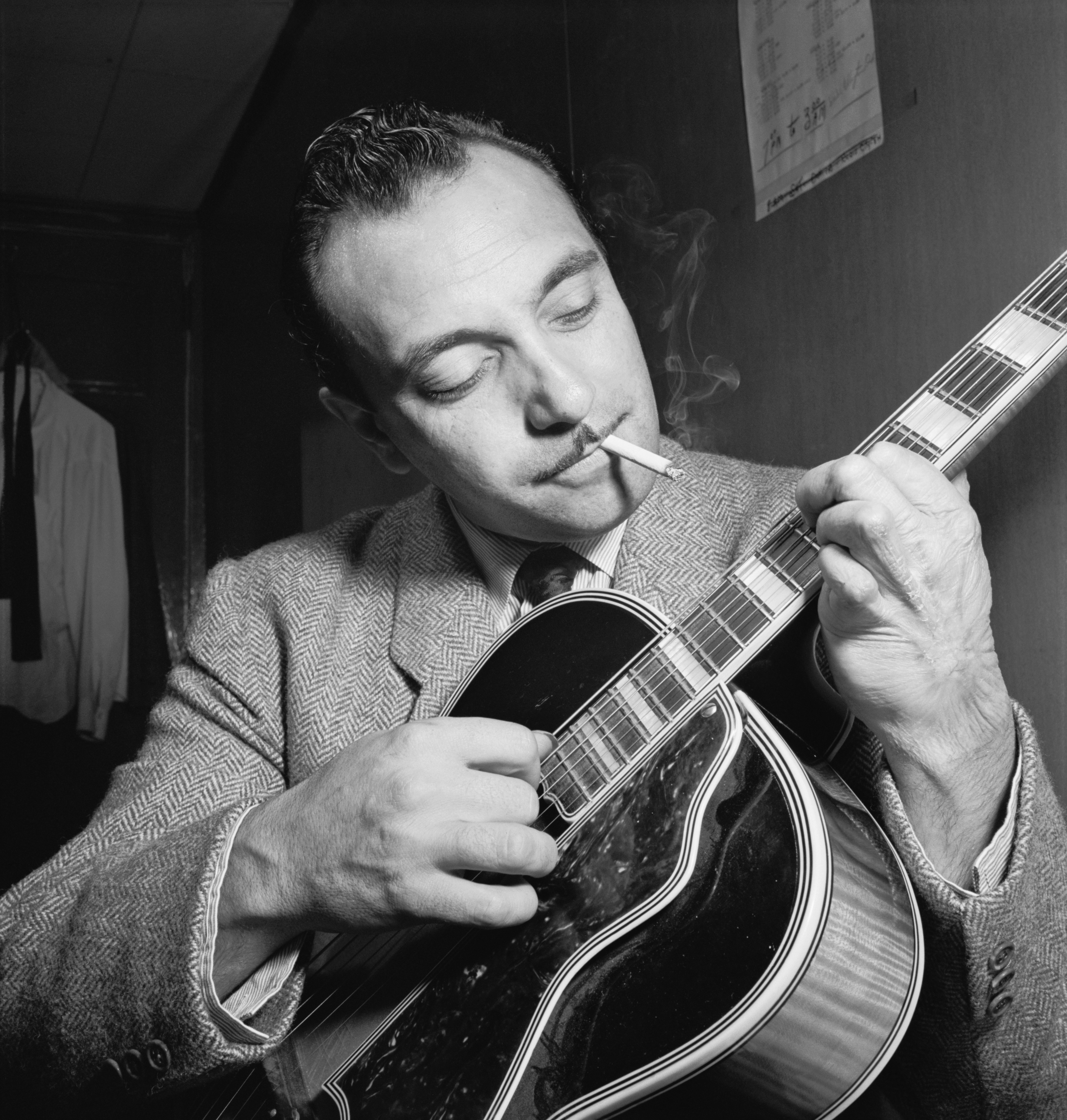
Django Reinhardt

- May 1 – Everett Shinn, American painter (b. 1876)
- May 5 – R. K. Shanmukham Chetty, Indian jurist, economist (b. 1892)
- May 16
  - Nicolae Rădescu, Romanian military officer and statesman, 45th Prime Minister of Romania (b. 1874)
  - Django Reinhardt, Belgian jazz musician (b. 1910)
- May 19 – Dámaso Berenguer, Spanish general and prime minister (b. 1873)
- May 21 – Ernst Zermelo, German logician and mathematician (b. 1871)
- May 30 – Dooley Wilson, American actor (b. 1886)
- May 31 – Vladimir Tatlin, Soviet and Russian painter and architect (b. 1885)

=== June ===
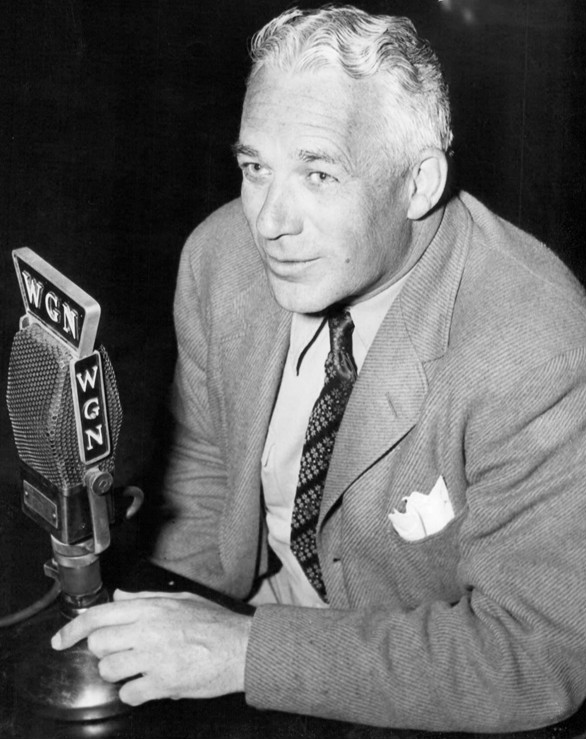
Norman Ross

- June 1 – Alex James, Scottish footballer (b. 1901)
- June 5
  - William Farnum, American actor (b. 1876)
  - Bill Tilden, American tennis champion (b. 1893)
  - Roland Young, English actor (b. 1887)
- June 9 – Godfrey Tearle, British actor (b. 1884)
- June 18 – René Fonck, French aviator, top Allied World War I Flying Ace (b. 1894)
- June 19
  - Julius and Ethel Rosenberg, American communist spies (b. 1918 and 1915, respectively) (executed on same day)
  - Norman Ross, American Olympic swimmer (b. 1896)
- June 23 – Albert Gleizes, French artist and theoretician (b. 1881)
- June 25 – Francis Méano, French footballer (b. 1931)
- June 30
  - Elsa Beskow, Swedish author and illustrator of children's books (b. 1874)
  - Vsevolod Pudovkin, Soviet film director, screenwriter and actor (b. 1893)

=== July ===
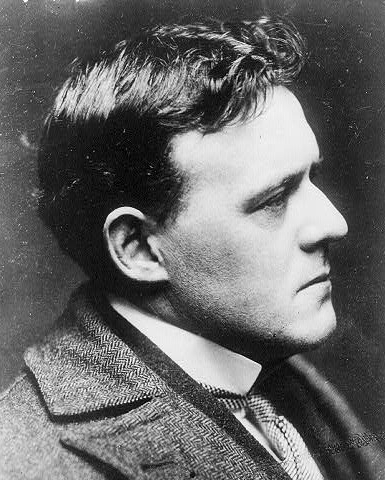
Hilaire Belloc

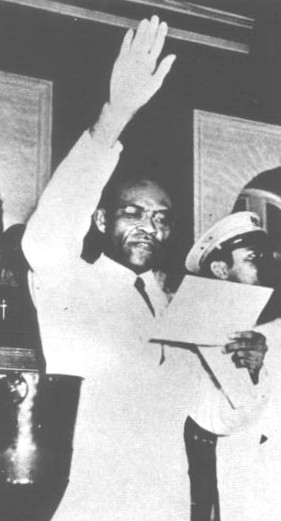
Dumarsais Estimé

- July 9 – Annie Kenney, British working-class suffragette (b. 1879)
- July 11 – Oliver Campbell, American tennis player (b. 1871)
- July 12 – Herbert Rawlinson, English actor (b. 1885)
- July 15 – John Christie, English serial killer (b. 1899) (hanged)
- July 16 – Hilaire Belloc, French-born British writer and historian (b. 1870)
- July 17 – Maude Adams, American actress (b. 1872)
- July 20 – Dumarsais Estimé, 30th President of Haiti (b. 1900)
- July 26 – Nikolaos Plastiras, Greek general and Prime Minister (b. 1883)
- July 29 – Richard Pearse, New Zealand airplane pioneer (b. 1877)
- July 31 – Robert A. Taft, American politician, United States Senate Majority Leader (b. 1889)

=== August ===
- August 1 – Jānis Mendriks, Soviet Roman Catholic priest (b. 1907)
- August 11 – Tazio Nuvolari, Italian racing driver (b. 1892)
- August 15 – Ludwig Prandtl, German physicist (b. 1875)
- August 30
  - Gaetano Merola, Italian conductor (b. 1881)
  - Maurice Nicoll, British psychiatrist (b. 1884)

=== September ===
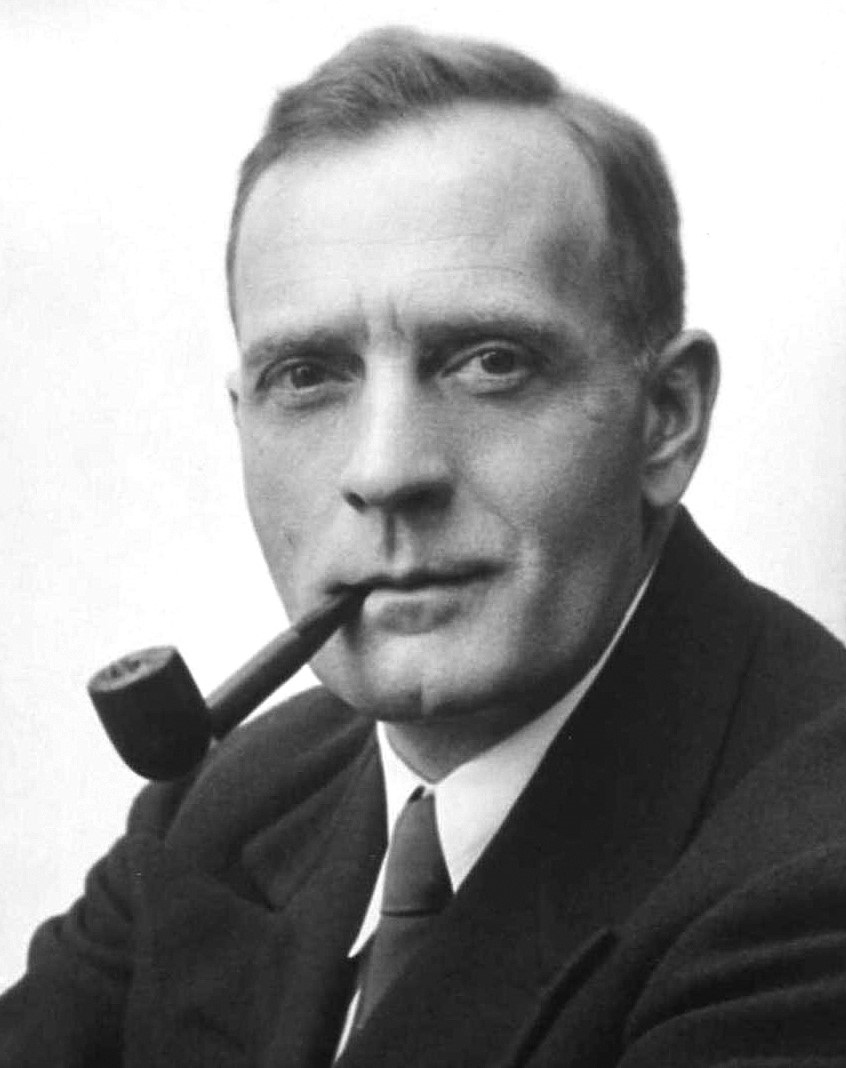
Edwin Hubble

- September 2 – Jonathan M. Wainwright, American general and Medal of Honor recipient (b. 1883)
- September 5
  - Richard Walther Darré, Nazi SS General (b. 1895)
  - Francis Ford, American actor and director (b. 1881)
- September 7 – Nobuyuki Abe, Japanese Prime Minister and military leader (b. 1875)
- September 8 – Fred M. Vinson, Chief Justice of the United States (b. 1890)
- September 12
  - Hugo Schmeisser, German weapons designer (b. 1884)
  - Lewis Stone, American actor (b. 1879)
- September 15 – Erich Mendelsohn, German architect (b. 1887)
- September 24 – Jacobo Fitz-James Stuart, 17th Duke of Alba, Spanish aristocrat (born 1878)
- September 26 – Xu Beihong, Chinese painter (b. 1895)
- September 27 – Hans Fritzsche, German Nazi senior official, one of only three acquitted at the Nuremberg trials (b. 1900)
- September 28 – Edwin Hubble, American astronomer (b. 1889)
- September 30 – Lewis Fry Richardson, English mathematician, physicist, meteorologist, psychologist and pacifist (b. 1881)

=== October ===
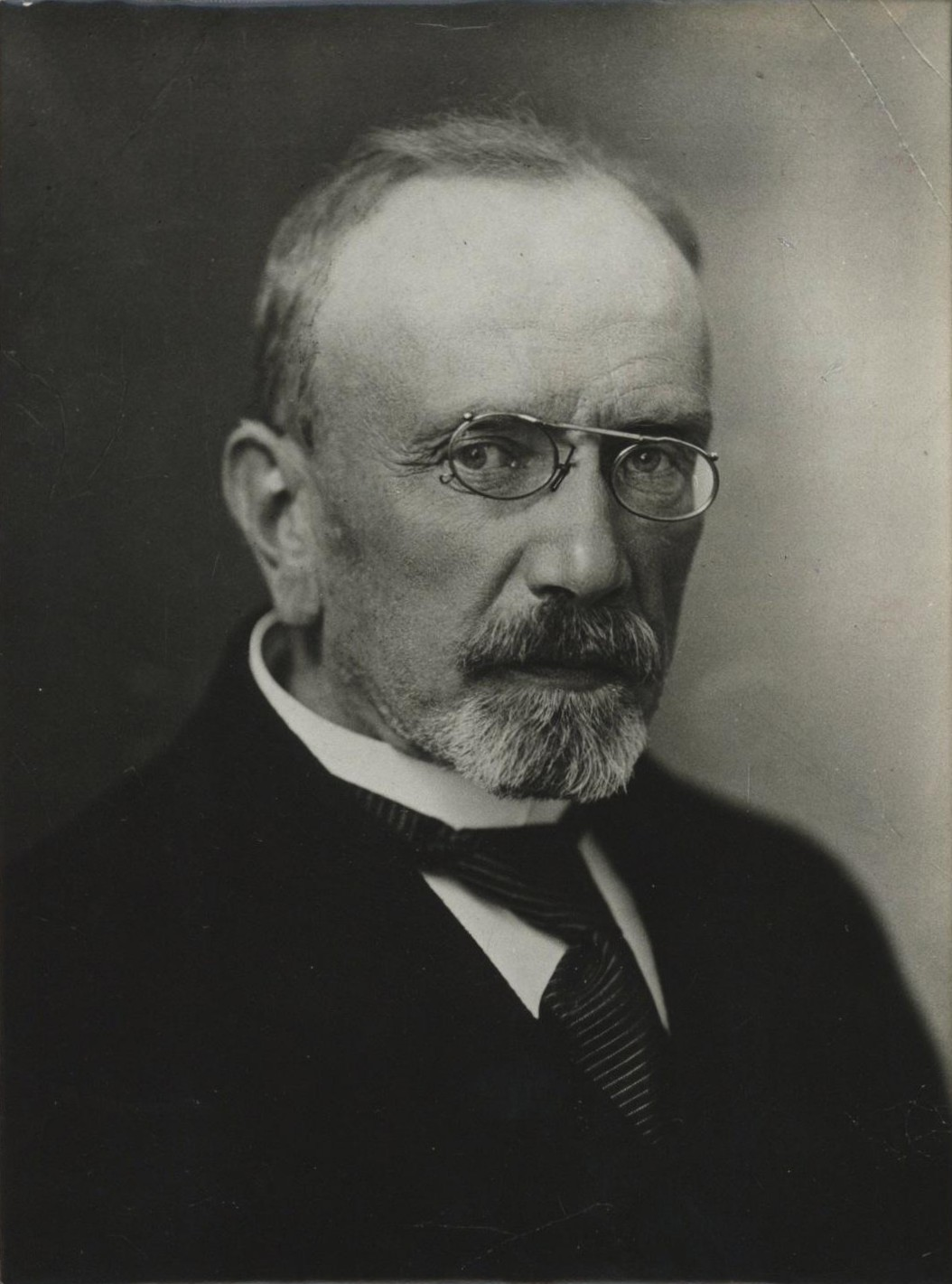
Hjalmar Hammarskjold

- October 3 – Sir Arnold Bax, English composer (b. 1887)
- October 6 – Porter Hall, American actor (b. 1888)
- October 8
  - Nigel Bruce, British actor (b. 1895)
  - Kathleen Ferrier, British contralto (b. 1912)
- October 12 – Hjalmar Hammarskjöld, Swedish politician, 13th Prime Minister of Sweden, one of the leaders of World War I (b. 1862)
- October 13 – Millard Mitchell, American actor (b. 1903)
- October 25 – Holger Pedersen, Dutch linguist (b. 1867)

=== November ===
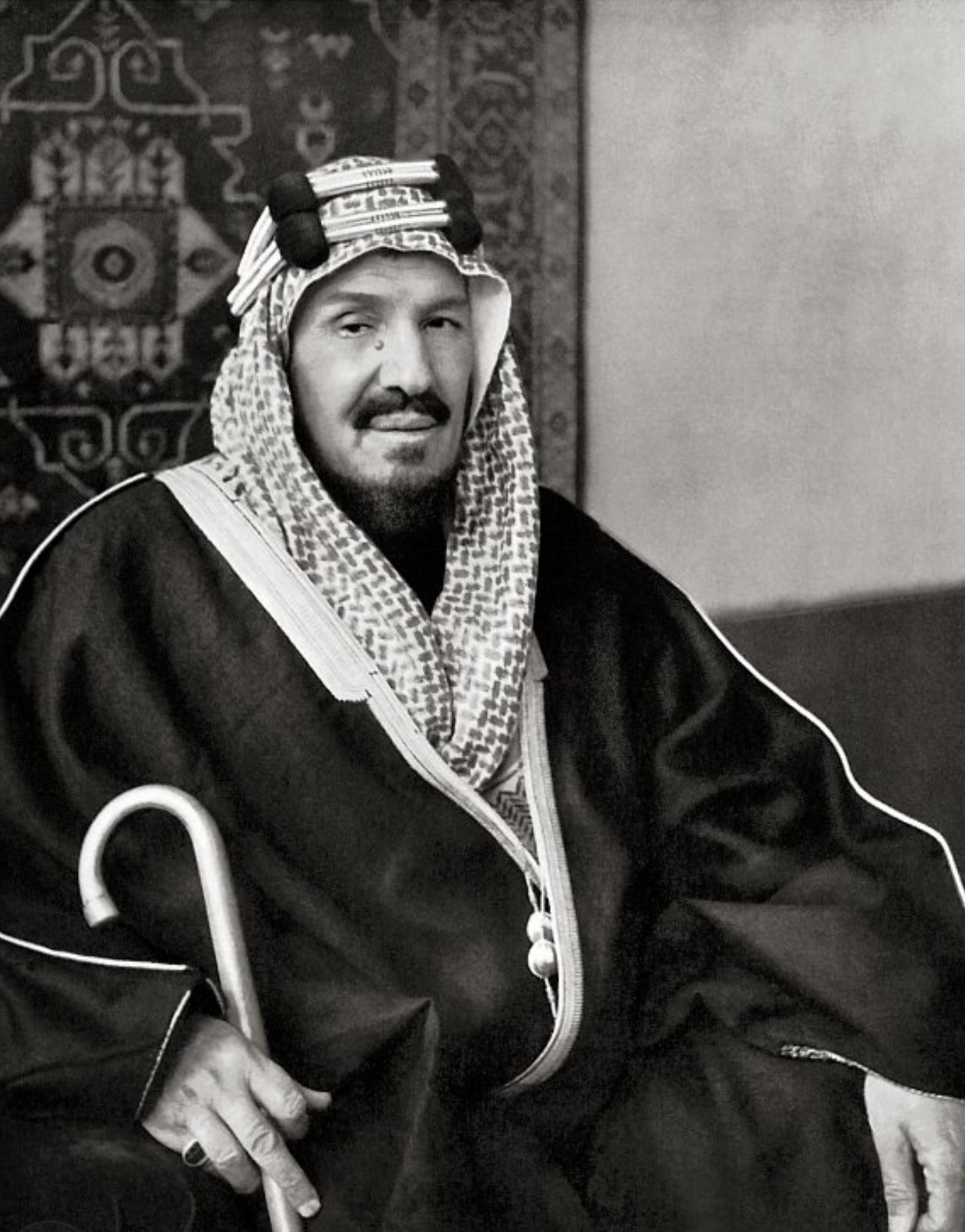
King Ibu Saud

- November 8 – Ivan Bunin, Russian writer, Nobel Prize laureate (b. 1870)
- November 9
  - King Ibn Saud of Saudi Arabia (b. 1875)
  - Dylan Thomas, Welsh poet and author (b. 1914)
- November 16 – T. F. O'Rahilly, Irish academic (b. 1882)
- November 18 – Ruth Crawford Seeger, American composer (b. 1901)
- November 22 – Sulaiman Nadvi, Indian/Pakistani historian, biographer, littérateur and scholar of Islam (b. 1884)
- November 27 – Eugene O'Neill, American writer, Nobel Prize laureate (b. 1888)
- November 28 – Rudolf Bauer, German-born painter (b. 1889)
- November 29
  - Ernest Barnes, English mathematician, scientist and theologian (b. 1874)
  - Sam De Grasse, Canadian actor (b. 1875)
- November 30 – Francis Picabia, French painter and poet (b. 1879)

=== December ===
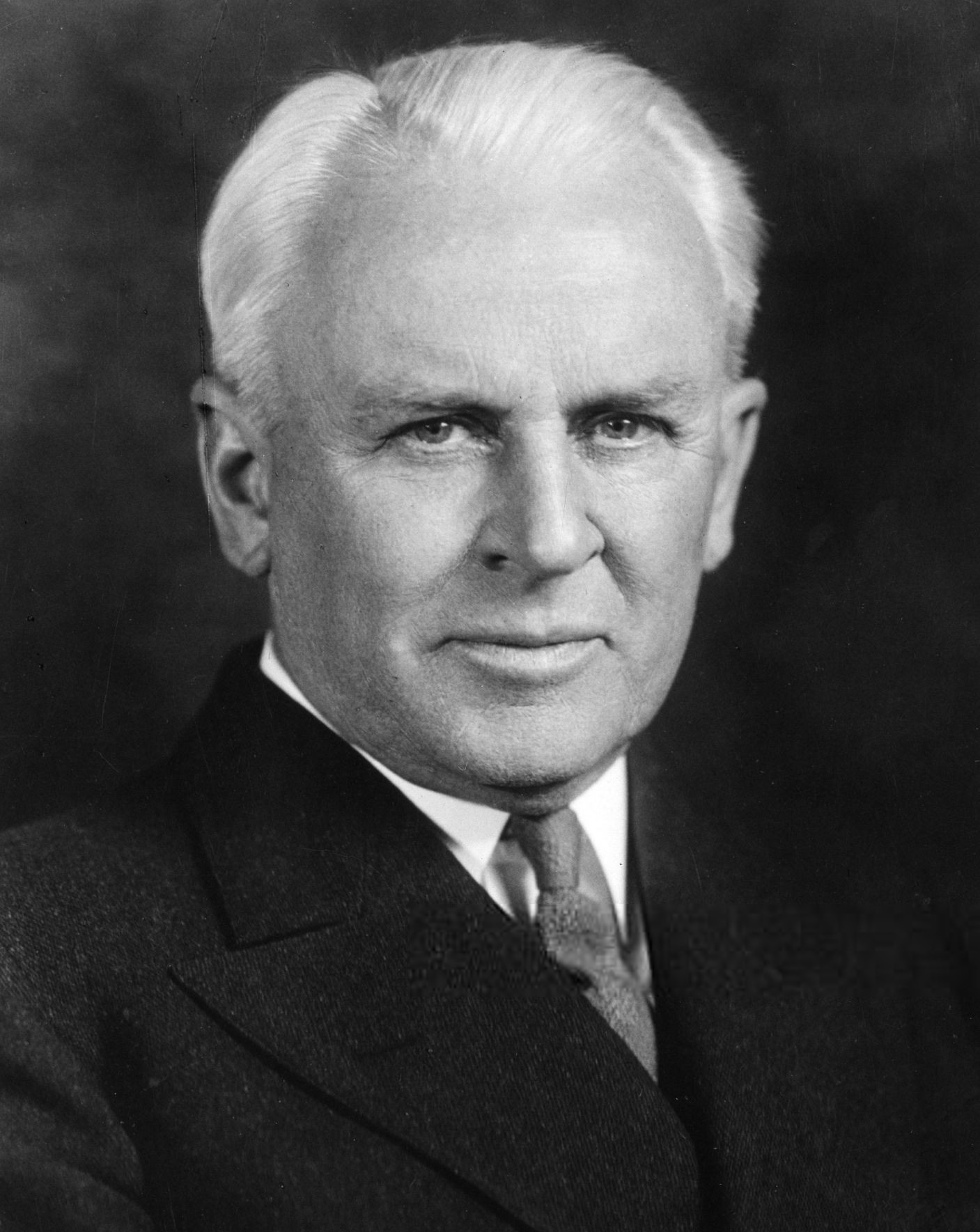
Robert Andrews Millikan

- December 2 – Trần Trọng Kim, Vietnamese historian and Prime Minister of the Empire of Vietnam (b. 1883)
- December 5 – Jorge Negrete, Mexican singer and actor (b. 1911)
- December 10 – Abdullah Yusuf Ali, Indian-born Islamic scholar and translator (b. 1872)
- December 14 – Marjorie Kinnan Rawlings, American writer (b. 1896)
- December 19 – Robert Andrews Millikan, American physicist Nobel Prize laureate (b. 1868)
- December 23 – Lavrentiy Beria, Minister of Internal Affairs of the Soviet Union (b. 1899)
- December 27
  - Şükrü Saracoğlu, 9th Prime Minister of Turkey (b. 1887)
  - Julian Tuwim, Polish poet (b. 1894)
- December 31 – Baldwin Cooke, American actor (b. 1888)

== Nobel Prizes ==

- Physics – Frits Zernike
- Chemistry – Hermann Staudinger
- Medicine – Hans Adolf Krebs, Fritz Albert Lipmann
- Literature – Sir Winston Leonard Spencer Churchill
- Peace – George Marshall
