= Beirut Art Center =

Exhibition space in Lebanon

- Location within Beirut Location within Lebanon
- Established: 2009
- Location: Beirut, Lebanon
- Coordinates: 33.879976°N 35.530477°E
- Type: Contemporary art; Installation art
- Director: Ibrahim Nehme
- Website: beirutartcenter.org

Beirut Art Center is a space for exhibiting contemporary art in Beirut, Lebanon

== History ==
Beirut Art Center opened to public in January 2009. It is managed as a non-profit organization whose founders and executive board members were Sandra Dagher, Lamia Joreige, Nathalie Khoury, Rabih Mroué and Maria Ousseimi The project roots in the growing interest to local contemporary art. It was an initiative of Sandra Dagher, who previously curated a private art space, Espace SD, and Lamia Joreige, visual artist. In 2007, Sandra Dagher curated with Saleh Barakat, owner of Agial Art Gallery in Beirut, the first Lebanese Pavilion at the Venice Biennale.

In 2011, New York City's New Museum hosted “Museum as Hub: Beirut Art Center” a project that includes an exhibition, the presentation of Beirut Art Center’s Médiathèque, and a series of events.

After co-founders Sandra Dagher and Lamia Joreige have been in charge of the BAC for five years, Marie Muracciole was appointed in February 2014 to take its direction for a five-years mandate. In 2019, Rana Nasser-Eddin was named administrative director and two artists, Haig Aivazian and Ahmad Ghossein were appointed artistic directors. In January 2023, Reem Shadid was appointed as director.

== Building ==
The BAC opened in Jisr el Wati, an industrial area on the banks of Beirut River. The building was refurbished by architect Raed Abillama from a factory into a white cube space. The 1500 sq m space occupied 2 floors. The ground floor included the main exhibition space, a book store and an auditorium. The first floor included a secondary exhibition space, a médiathèque, a cafe with a terrasse, and the administrative offices. In 2019, Beirut Art Center moved into a new location, in the same neighborhood, occupying two floors in a warehouse building.

== Exhibitions ==
2019

- Home Works 8: I will return, and I will be millions
- Home Works 8: The distance between your eyes and the Sun (Charbel-joseph H. Boutros)
- Touché! (Gesture, Movement, Action) with Basel Abbas and Ruanne About Rahme, Majd Abdel Hamid, Francis Alÿs, George Awde, Yto Barrada, Mathilde Besson, Ismail Bahri, Manon de Boer, Tacita Dean, Ali Eyal, Omar Fakhoury, Hiba Farhat, Ghida Hachicho, Mona Hatoum, Ana Jotta, Hassan Khan, Nesrine Khodr, Joachim Koester, Arthur Ligeon, Pierre Leguillon, Mathilde Lequenne, Dala Nasser, Roman Signer, Rania Stephan (curated by Marie Muracciole and C Wavelet)
- How to Reappear: through the Quivering Leaves of Independent Publishing

2018

- Of Words and Stones. Zineb Sedira, (curated by Marie Muracciole)
- Things That Shine and Things That Are Dark. Joachim Koester (curated by Marie Muracciole)
- International Tourism (Staging Real Life). Marie Voignier (curated by Marie Muracciole)
- Slow Light. Daniele Genadry (curated by Marie Muracciole)
- Space Edits (The Trouble with Language), with Vito Acconci, Richard Artschwager, Nairy Baghramian, Janette Laverrière, Marcel Broodthaers, William S. Burroughs, Guy de Cointet, Robert Wilhite, Claude Closky, Baris Dogrusöz, Gheith Al Amine, Jean-Pascal Flavien, David Hammons, Iman Issa, Nesrine Khodr, Ali Meer, Pallavi Paul, Ieva Saudargaité Douaihi, Natascha Sadr Haghighian, Nicholas Bussmann, Roy Samaha (curated Marie Muracciole )
- Two Meetings and a Funeral. Naeem Mohaiemen
- Knots'n Dust. Francis Alÿs (curated by Marie Muracciole)

2017

- Sharjah Biennial 13. Tamawuj: an unpredictable expression of human potential
- Photography at Work. Allan Sekula (curated by Marie Muracciole)
- Falling is not extending, Falling is collapsing, Marwa Arsianos, (curated by Marie Muracciole)
- On Becoming Two, Tony Chakar, (curated by Marie Muracciole).
- A Chapter of Synonyms, Rana ElNemr, (curated by Marie Muracciole).

2016

- Exposure 8 - Metabolism with Monica Basbous Moukarzel, Mohamed Berro, Mochu, Bahar Noorizadeh, Núria Güell & Levi Orta, Anna Ogden-Smith, Rivers Plasketes, (curated by Marie Muracciole)
- The Portrait is an Address, Hassan Khan, exposition solo, (curated by Marie Muracciole)
- Unravelled, (curated by Marie Muracciole and Rachel Dedman) with Majd Abdel Hamid, Mounira Al Solh, Yto Barrada, Taysir Batniji, Alighiero e Boetti, Michele Cohen, Janna Dyk, Mona Hatoum, Sheila Hicks, Annette Messager, Khalil Rabah, Karen Reimer, Nasri Sayegh, Laure Tixier, Raed Yassin; September -November
- Esma’/Listen, with Lawrence Abu Hamdan, Francis Alÿs, Vartan Avakian, Pauline Boudry and Renate Lorenz, Moyra Davey, Melissa Dubbin and Aaron Davidson, Pierre Huyghe, Alvin Lucier, Christian Marclay, Olaf Nicolai, Sharif Sehnaoui, Jessica Warboys, Cynthia Zaven (curated Marie Muracciole and Marcella Lista)
- Landversation Beirut, Otobong Nkanga, (curated by Marie Muracciole).

2015

- Exposure 7 – Mobility, with Yasmin Hage-Meany, Sandra Iché, Eshan Rafi, Mahmoud Safadi, Merve Unsal, (curated by Marie Muracciole).
- Aftercinema, with Kamal Aljafari, La Ribot, Jumana Manna, (curated by Marie Muracciole).
- Unfinished Conversation, around Stuart Hall with John Akomfrah, Penny Siopis, Zineb Sedira, (curated by Marie Muracciole).

2014

- Breath is a Sculpture. Giuseppe Penone
- Contre Nature. Kader Attia
- Meeting Points 7. Beirut: Ten Thousand Wiles and a Hundred Thousand Tricks
- Afteratlas

2013

- Video Vintage 1963 - 1983, from Centre Pompidou′s New Media Collection
- Groundwork. Jananne Al-Ani
- Now Here Then Elsewhere, Eric Baudelaire

2012

- Exposure 2012
- White Wall
- Khalil Rabah, review
- Gerhard Richter - Beirut
- Revolution vs. Revolution with Abbas, Vyacheslav Akhunov, Francis Alÿs, Hai Bo, Steven Cohen, Phil Collins, Tacita Dean, Fadi El Abdallah, David Goldblatt, Alfredo Jaar, William Kentridge, Marysia Lewandowska & Neil Cummings, Susan Meiselas, Boris Mikhailov

2011

- Exposure 2011
- The Beirut Experience
- Be...longing. Fouad Elkoury
- Image in the Aftermath
- Meeting Points 6. Locus Agonistes: Practices and Logics of the Civic
- IMAGE WORKS. Harun Farocki
- Drawing with the Things Themselves. Paola Yacoub

2010

- Par quatre chemins. Chris Marker
- Exposure 2010
- Witness Mona Hatoum
- Home Works 5
- Place at Last. Walid Sadek
- affiliations. Emily Jacir

2009

- America
- Earth of Endless Secrets. Writing for a Posterior Time. Akram Zaatari
- Prisoner Of War. Bernard Khoury
- The Road to Peace
- 4
- Exposure 2009
- Closer

== BAC Design ==
BAC Design was a program dedicated to local industrial and product design.

2013

- Fly Bird Fly by Dar Onboz

2012

- Biomechania by Ranya Sarakbi
- Contemporary Perspectives in Middle Eastern Crafts. BAC design Exhibition by Carwan Gallery with Karen Chekerdjian, Khalid Shafar, Lindsey Adelman, Marc Baroud, Studio mischer'traxler, Nada Debs, Oeuffice, Paul Loebach, Philippe Malouin, Tamer Nakisci
- Street Art Bag by Sarah's Bag
- Pathways by Nada Zeineh
- Custom Miles by Azzi & Osta
- All that is reminiscent of her name by Krikor Jabotian
- The Creative Space

2011

- Beirut Rock Center. By Spockdesign - Karim Chaya
- Beirutkon. Anastasia Nysten, Carlo Massoud, Joelle Achkar, Marc Dibeh
- Seeds. A BAC design exhibition by Nathalie Khayat
- STARCH your summer. An exhibition by STARCH designers 2008-2009-2010
- The Order of Angels. by Hoda and Elias Baroudi
- Who's living on the 13th floor?. An Exhibition of Ceramics by Mary-Lynn Massoud and Racha Nawam

2010

- Capturing Culture. by Rana Salam
