= Dedman =

Dedman is a surname. Notable people with the surname include:

- Bill Dedman (born 1960), American journalist, Pulitzer Prize winner and bestselling author
- John Dedman (1896–1973), minister in the Australian Labor Party governments led by John Curtin and Ben Chifley
- Rachel Dedman (born 1989), English curator and art historian
- Robert H. Dedman Sr. (1926-2002), American businessman and philanthropist, founder and past chairman of ClubCorp.
- Stephen Dedman (born 1959), Australian author of dark fantasy and science fiction stories and novel.

== See also ==
- Dedman College of Humanities and Sciences of Southern Methodist University
- Dedman School of Hospitality, located in Tallahassee, Florida
- Dedman School of Law Southern Methodist University School of Law
