= Bernard Sabrier =

Swiss financial entrepreneur

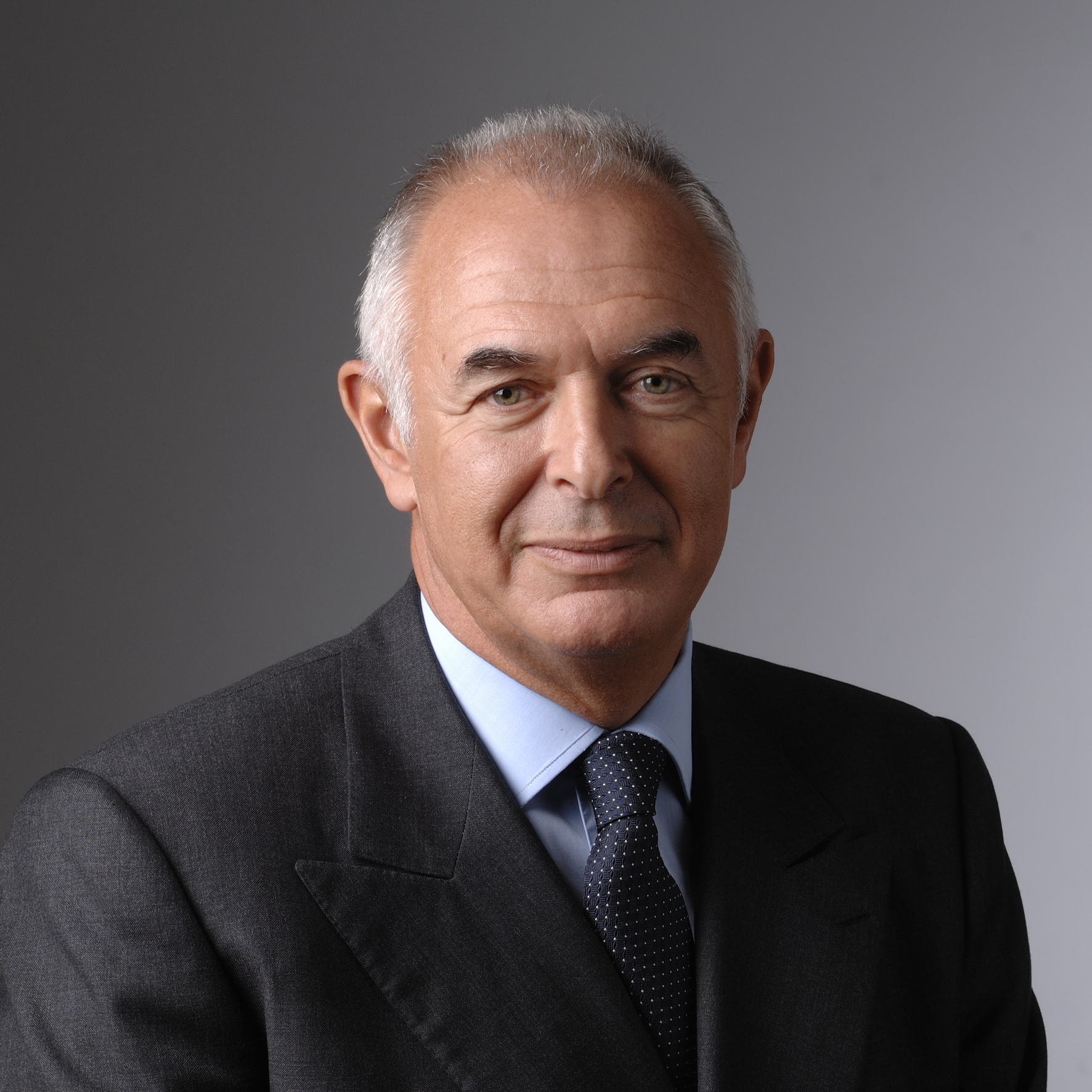
- Occupation: Chairman of Unigestion

Bernard Sabrier, is a Swiss financial entrepreneur. Born on 12 February 1953, he took over the Geneva-based company Unigestion from his father in 1976 and developed it into an international asset manager focused on private equity, equities, and wealth management. Following a strategic restructuring in 2025, these businesses were split into three separate companies.

In addition to driving Unigestion’s growth as Chairman, Mr Sabrier is focused on his charitable activities, establishing the Children’s Action charity in 1994 and the Famsa Foundation in 2011. He is President of both organisations.

He is also an art enthusiast who co-founded the Museum of Modern Art in Geneva in 1994 and is active on various boards and bodies including the Marshall Institute for Philanthropy and Social Entrepreneurship at the London School of Economics. He is also involved with the Global Commission on Science Missions for Sustainability.

== Career ==
=== Early career ===
Bernard Sabrier started his career in finance working at Paribas in Geneva from 1972, followed by a stint at Renault Finance between 1975 and 1976, where he focused on fixed income and foreign currency investments.

=== Unigestion ===
Unigestion, which is headquartered in Geneva, has offices in 10 locations in Europe, North America, and Asia, and mainly manages assets for institutional clients and high net worth families. It is focused largely on private equity and equities.

Over the past two decades, Unigestion has integrated social responsibility into its business; developing its capabilities as a responsible investor. In 2011, Sabrier established the Swiss-regulated Famsa Foundation as the controlling shareholder in Unigestion (see Charitable Activities). Other shareholders include employees and institutional investors.

== Charitable activities ==
Bernard Sabrier is involved in several charitable projects. He established the Children Action charity in 1994 and the Famsa Foundation in 2011. He is actively involved in both organisations as Chairman.

He has spoken frequently on how donors should give with the right mindset to get the right results for beneficiaries, clearly understanding the responsibilities they have to not only give money but to ensure projects they support are managed well with leadership, understanding and humility.

=== Children Action ===
Children Action works to make a difference in the lives of disadvantaged children around the world. The charity works with professionals to address issues facing children, including healthcare access, education, psychological support, and youth suicide.

Children Action celebrated its 30 year anniversary in 2024 and over the past three decades, has transformed the lives of some 236,449 beneficiaries.

One of the charity’s major ongoing commitments is to help reduce the suicide rate among teenagers in Switzerland and in 1996 it worked with University Hospitals of Geneva to establish a crisis unit to focus on suicide care and prevention.

On 5 June 2023, Children Action's vision for the creation of a care and prevention centre for adolescents in distress was realised with the inauguration of the Maison de l'Enfance et de l'Adolescence (MEA) in Geneva. The inauguration of the centre was the culmination of a 27-year public-private partnership between the University Hospitals of Geneva and Children Action, supported by the Hans Wilsdorf Foundation. By the end of 2024, Children Action had supported 25,040 young people in their fight against distress and depression.

Children Action also implements surgical programmes aimed at providing medical care to children, partnering with some 34 top-level European medical specialists to provide treatment and the transfer of knowledge to local medical teams. Over 15,816 operations have been undertaken since the Charity's creation. In 2024, 13 missions were carried out - nine in Vietnam, two in Cameroon and two in Laos - with 361 children receiving surgical treatment.

The charity has provided school meals and supplies to children in 13 provinces in Vietnam since starting its nutrition programme in 2007, distributing around 504,154 meals and 130,000 school books during this time. Children Action also provides psychosocial support for young mothers in Argentina and Peru, with 32,547 people benefiting from this support since 2003. Humanitarian aid for children and families living near conflict zones, such as Ukraine, has also been provided, together with support for families in need in French-speaking Switzerland during the COVID-19 pandemic.

=== Famsa Foundation ===
The Famsa Foundation was established in 2011 as the controlling shareholder of asset manager Unigestion. The Foundation is regulated in Switzerland by the Federal Supervisory Authority of Foundations and is an autonomous legal entity irrevocably committed to carry out its defined purpose.

Dividends generated by Unigestion are used by Famsa to make large financial contributions to projects in the charitable, educational, cultural and medical fields. The largest beneficiaries are projects catering to the specific needs of children, arts and culture and medical research and include Children Action, Harlem Children’s Zone, the Fondation privee des HUG, Beirut Art Center, Mamco, Les Amis du Musee du Louvre (Paris), Le CHUV (Lausanne), Fondazione Mater and Centre Otium.

== Other interests ==
Sabrier is a keen photographer and art enthusiast. He co-founded the Museum of Modern Art in Geneva in 1994 and in 2020, Steidl published a book of his photography on the people of Vanuatu, with whom he has formed a personal bond.

He is also active on a number of boards and bodies. In December 2021, Sabrier became a member of the Global Commission on Science Missions for Sustainability at the International Science Council to help mobilise a $100m a year global fund for sustainability science missions in the critical areas of food, energy and climate, health and wellbeing, water and urban areas.

He is also a member of the Advisory Council of the Marshall Institute for Philanthropy and Social Entrepreneurship at the London School of Economics, working to improve the impact and effectiveness of private action for public benefit. In 2022, he joined the Advisory Board of the Marshall Impact Accelerator.
