= Marie Muracciole =

French art curator, critic and author

- Born: France
- Occupations: Art curator, art critic and author
- Organization(s): Beirut Art Center director (2014–2019). Member of the cultural department at Galerie nationale du Jeu de Paume from 1991 then its director (2005–2011).

Marie Muracciole is a writer and curator based in Paris.

== Early life ==
Marie Muracciole studied at the École nationale supérieure des Beaux-Arts de Paris. She shifted her visual art practice to writing in 1991.

== Career ==
Muracciole has held positions as head of the cultural department at Paris's Galerie nationale du Jeu de Paume until 2011.

She taught in ESAD, Amiens, as a contemporary art professor until 1998, then as film theory professor at the École Supérieure des Beaux Arts de Bordeaux until 2017.

She has been the director of the Beirut Art Center from February 2014 to February 2019.

She is now an External Visiting Lecturer and Tutor in Fine Art at the Malmö Art Academy, Sweden.

She was curator of 2024 biennial of Québec.

== Selected exhibitions ==
Muracciole curated numerous exhibitions in museums and art centers, including Claude Closky Climb at your own risk at Madre (Naples, 2007); Yto Barrada RIffs at the Deutsche Guggenheim (Berlin, 2011), Fotomuseum (Winterthur), the Wiels (Brussels), The Renaissance Society (Chicago, 2012); Allan Sekula Disassembled Movies 1972–2012 at Akbank Sanat, Istanbul in collaboration with Ali Akay.l A Wonderfully Inadequate Medium: Allan Sekula and Photography, at Marian Goodman Gallery London, March to May 2019. Yto Barrada, Holes in the moon, ENSAPC (école des beaux-arts de Paris-Cergy), l’Été culturel, August to September 2020.

At Beirut Art Center (BAC) Muracciole curated monographies of Zineb Sedira, Joachim Koester, Marie Voignier, Danièle Genadry, Naeem Mohaiemen, Allan Sekula, Marwa Arsianos, Tony Shakar, Rana El Nemer, Hassan Khan, Otobong Nkanga, as well as many group shows. Francis Alÿs Knots'n Dust at the Ikon Gallery and the BAC.

== Selected writings ==
She contributes to Texte zur Kunst, Berlin, and to the French art magazines Les Cahiers du Musée d'Art Moderne, Art Press, 20/27. Among her publications, Contre-courants: à propos d’Allan Sekula et d’Aerospace, in Jeux sérieux, (HEAD), 2015, Something New About Plants, Genealogy Tree, in Yto Barrada (JPRingier, 2013); A Love Story, Transportations, in Amar Kanwar: Evidence (Fotomuseum Winterthur/Steidl, 2012); Memory's body. "Retrospective" by Xavier Le Roy, in Texte zur Kunst, 2011/12; Tomorrow Never Knows, Peter Roehr, in 20/27 n°5, 2010.

She is the editor of Claude Closky Climb at Your Own Risk (Naples: Electa, 2007), Yto Barrada Riffs (Berlin: Deutsche Guggenheim, 2011), Allan Sekula's writing (Paris: École nationale supérieure des Beaux-Arts, 2013), Photography at Work: Allan Sekula (Beirut: Beirut Art Center, 2017), Knots'n Dust: Francis Alÿs (Dijon : Les Presses du réel, 2018).

=== Books ===
Knots’n Dust, Francis Alys, (texts Michael Taussig and M.M.) Beirut Art Center, 2018. Photography at Work, Allan Sekula, (text from M.M.) Beirut Art Center, 2017. Exposure 6, 7 and 8, Beirut Art Center, 2015, 2016 and 2017. Editor with Benjamin Young of Greyroom special issue on Allan Sekula, spring 2014. Écrits sur la photographie, French translation of the texts in Allan Sekula's Photography Against the Grain including “The Body and the Archive”, editor and translator, éditions de l’ENSBA, Paris, 2013. Yto Barrada, RIFFS, (texts Okwui Envezor, Daniel Soutif, Negar Azimi, M.M.) English, German, Italian, Flemish and French editions, Hatje Cantz, 2011. Climb at your own risk, Claude Closky, Eduardo Cicelyn, Katy Siegel & Paul Mattick, M.M., English and Italian Editions, Electa, Napoli, 2007. Le Statut de l’auteur dans l’image documentaire, signature du neutre, Actes de colloque, Galerie nationale du Jeu de Paume, 2006.

=== Essays ===
« Lévitation », in Si petits entre les étoiles, catalogue de la biennale de Québec, éd. Musée National des beaux-arts de Québec, 2019. “Silence, moteur, mouvements” in Zineb Sedira, Sharjah Foundation, 2017. “(Prière de toucher)” in Pierre-Lin Renié, D'autres jours / On Other Days, 2017 “Quitte ou double”, in Bernard Piffaretti Catalogue raisonnable, 2016, MAMCO, Genève. “Contre-courants : à propos d’Allan Sekula et d’Aerospace”, in Jeux sérieux – Cinéma et art contemporains transforment l’essai, HEAD et MAMCO, 2015. “Elisabeth Ballet, Attirance fatale (Underground)”, in Art Public Poitiers, Les presses du reel, 2014. “Something New About Plants, Genealogy Tree“, in Yto Barrada, JPRingier, 2013. “Extrait (de sang-froid) “, in catalogue Sylvie Fanchon, SF, musée de Dole, 2012. “Transports, A Love Story“ in Evidence, Amar Kanwar, Steidl, 2012. “Passons, Ich Sterbe“, in Les Sept Monde, Marylène Négro, ed Analogues, 2012. “Redistributing narratives with Yto Barrada“, in Plot for a Biennal, Sharjah, 2011. “Aleksandra Mir, Space Invader“, in Mutations, Paris Photo, Steidel 2011. “You Get It ?” in Eric Duyckaerts, ‘idéo, éditions du MacVal, 2011. “Tomorrow Never Knows, Peter Roehr”, in 20/27 n°5, 2010. “Ceal Floyer: Le bruit de l’esprit“, in 20/27 n°3, 2009. “L’objet de ce commentaire, Tino Seghal”, Cahiers du MNAM, Falls 2007. “Qui parle ? This is not a time for dreaming, Pierre Huyghe”, in Cahiers du MNAM. “ Time Serial Killer ”; “ See the Words ”; “ Reading the Visible ”; in Claude Closky, catalogue 315, editions Centre Georges Pompidou, Paris, 2006. “Le bruit des images, entretien avec David Claerbout ” in Cahiers du MNAM 94, 2005–2006. “Le labyrinthe des cartes ”, in Cox Codex, Paul Cox, Le Seuil, Paris, 2003. “Une fiction permet de saisir la réalité et en même temps ce qu’elle cache ”, essai sur Marcel Broodthaers, Le Portique n°5, Strasbourg, 2000.

=== Articles ===
“Documenta 14. Sans pertes ni profits“, in Revue L’art même, Bruxelles, juillet 2017. “Memory's body. Retrospective by Xavier Le Roy“ in Texte Zur Kunst, 2013. “Exhibition, Inhibition“, in Texte Zur Kunst n° 85, 2012. “It Is Your First Mirage Sophie. On Guy de Cointet“, Texte zur Kunst n°82, 2011 “Conversation avec Yto Barrada” in Index, Macba, 2011. “The Host and the Cloud, Pierre Huyghe”, in Art Press, Mai 2010. “ The Apse, the Bell and the Antilope ”, avec Aurélien Froment, Journal des Labos, 2008. “ Cartographie Friedl ”, in Critique d’art n°31, printemps 2008. “Civique coalisé communiste confiant“, (...) Yuri Leiderman, Art 3, Valence et Galerie Michel Rein, Paris, 2001.
