= Allan Sekula =

American artist and scholar (1951–2013)

Allan Sekula (January 15, 1951 – August 10, 2013) was an American photographer, writer, filmmaker, theorist and critic. From 1985 until his death in 2013, he taught at California Institute of the Arts. His work frequently focused on large economic systems, or "the imaginary and material geographies of the advanced capitalist world."

He received fellowships and grants from the Guggenheim Foundation, National Endowment for the Arts, Getty Research Institute, Deutsche Akademischer Austauschdienst (DAAD), Atelier Calder and was named a 2007 USA Broad Fellow.

== Life and work ==
Sekula was born in 1951 in Erie, Pennsylvania, of Polish and English descent. His family moved to San Pedro, California in the early 1960s. He graduated with his MFA from the University of California, San Diego, in 1974, after having obtained his BA in biology from the same institution.

Sekula's principal medium was photography, which he employed to create exhibitions, books and films. His secondary medium was the written word, employing essays and other critical texts in concert with images to create a multi-level critique of contemporary late capitalism. His works make critical contributions on questions of social reality and globalization, and focus on what he described as "the imaginary and material geographies of the advanced capitalist world". He was a film/video-maker, frequently collaborating with film theorist Noël Burch on projects such as The Reagan Tapes (1984) (with regard to Ronald Reagan), and The Forgotten Space (2010).

He served on the faculty of the Photography and Media Program at the California Institute of the Arts.

Sekula died on August 10, 2013, aged 62, following a long struggle with gastric-esophageal cancer.

== Books ==
- Photography Against the Grain: Essays and Photo Works 1973–1983 (1984).
- Fish Story (1995).
  - London: Mack, 2018. ISBN 978-1-912339-04-4. With a new introduction by Laleh Khalili.
- Dead Letter Office (1997).
- Geography Lesson: Canadian Notes (1997).
- Seemannsgarn (2002).
- Titanic's Wake (2003).
- Performance under Working Conditions (2003).
- A Dialogue with Allan Sekula (2005).
- Facing the Music: Documenting Walt Disney Hall and the Redevelopment of Downtown Los Angeles. East of Borneo Books, 2015. ISBN 978-0692312445. A project by Sekula. Edited by Edward Dimendberg, with contributions by Sekula, Louis Adamic, James Baker, Laura Diamond Dixit, Anthony Hernandez, Karin Apollonia Müller, Leonard Nadel, and Billy Woodberry.

== Films ==
- A Short Film for Laos (2006)
- The Forgotten Space (2010)

== Awards ==
- 1977: Art Critic's Fellowship, National Endowment for the Arts
- 1978: Artist's Fellowship, National Endowment for the Arts
- 1980: Art Critic's Fellowship., National Endowment for the Arts
- 1986: Guggenheim Fellowship from the John Simon Guggenheim Memorial Foundation
- 1999 - 2002: Research Grant, Getty Research Institute / J. Paul Getty Trust
- 2007: USA Broad Fellow and granted $50,000 by United States Artists
- Fellowship from the Deutsche Akademischer Austauschdienst (DAAD)
- Fellowship from the Atelier Calder

== Exhibitions ==
- 1973: Socialist Realism: Photo-Text Works by Fred Lonidier and Allan Sekula, Gallery A-402, California Institute of the Arts, Valencia, CA
- 1974: Brand Library Art Center, Glendale, California (solo)
- 1975: Video: Martha Rosler and Allan Sekula, The Kitchen, New York City
- 1976: New American Filmmakers Series: Connell, Sekula and Torres, Whitney Museum of American Art, New York City
- 1977: American Narrative/Story Art *1967-*1977, Contemporary Arts Museum, Houston, Texas
- 1977: Social Criticism and Art Practice, San Francisco Art Institute (co-curated by Roy Ascott and Victor Burgin)
- 1980: Martha Rosler and Allan Sekula, Anna Leonowens Gallery, Nova Scotia College of Art and Design, Halifax, Nova Scotia
- 1981: Erweiterte Fotografie: Fifth International Vienna Biennale, Vienna Secession, Vienna, Austria
- 1981: Absage an das Einzelbild, Folkwang Museum, Essen, Germany
- 1981: Likely Stories, Castelli Graphics, New York City
- 1983: Susan Meiselas and Allan Sekula, Film in the Cities Photo Gallery, St. Paul Minnesota
- 1983: Westbury. Traveled to State University of New York, Cortland Game, Amelie Wallace Gallery, State University of New York, Old Westbury. Traveled to State University of New York, Cortland, Cortland, New York
- 1984: Art and Ideology, New Museum of Contemporary Art, New York
- 1985: San Francisco Camerawork, San Francisco, CA (solo)
- 1987: Forum Stadtpark, Graz, Austria (solo)
- 1987: Vormen van Documentaire Photografie in de jaren '80, Galerie Perspektief, Rotterdam, Netherlands
- 1989: If You Lived Here: Home Front:, Dia Art Foundation, New York City
- 1989: Geography Lesson: Canadian Notes, Institute of Contemporary Art, Boston (solo). Traveled to Los Angeles Contemporary Exhibitions, Los Angeles; A Space, Toronto; P.S. 1, Long Island City, Queens, New York; Amelie Wallace Gallery, State University of New York, Old Westbury, New York; Washington Project for the Arts, Washington, D.C.; Mendel Art Gallery; Saskatoon, Saskatchewan; Art Gallery of Windsor, Windsor, Ontario; Western Front, Vancouver, British Columbia.
- 1991: Vancouver Art Gallery, Vancouver, British Columbia, Canada
- 1991: A Dialogue about Recent American and European Photography, Museum of Contemporary Art, Los Angeles
- 1991: The Power of Words: An Aspect of Recent Documentary Photography, PPOW Gallery, New York
- 1991: Critical Realism, Perspektief, Rotterdam
- 1992: Wasteland: Landscape from Now On, Fotografie Biennale, Rotterdam, Netherlands
- 1992: Proof: Los Angeles Art and the Photograph *1960-*1980, Laguna Art Museum, Laguna Beach, California
- 1993: *1993 Biennial Exhibition, Whitney Museum of American Art, New York City
- 1993: University Art Museum, Berkeley, California
- 1993: Trade Routes, New Museum of Contemporary Art, New York City
- 1994: Proposition I, One-Five, Brussels, Belgium
- 1995: Aerospace Folktales and Canadian Notes, Vancouver Art Gallery, Vancouver, British Columbia, Canada
- 1996: Witte de With Center for Contemporary Art, Rotterdam, Netherlands. Traveled to Moderna Museet, Stockholm, Sweden; Tramway, Glasgow; Le Channel and Musée des Beaux-Arts, Calais; Santa Monica Museum of Art, Santa Monica, CA.
- 1996: Museum Boymans van Beuningen, Rotterdam, Netherlands
- 1996: Face a l'Histoire, Centre Pompidou, Paris
- 1997: InSite 97, San Diego/Tijuana, Centro Cultural de Tijuana, Tijuana, Mexico
- 1998: Deep Six/Passer au bleu, Museé des Beaux Arts et de la Dentelle, Calais Galerie Michel Rein, Paris
- 1998: Dismal Science: Photo Works *1972-*1996, University Galleries, Illinois State University, Normal, Illinois; traveled to Palmer Museum, Pennsylvania State University, State College, Pennsylvania; daadgalerie, Berlin; Camerawork, London; Nederlands Foto Instituut, Rotterdam; Kunstverein Munchen, Munich, Germany; Curtain University Art Gallery, Perth; Atlanta College of Art, Atlanta; Palais des Beaux Arts, Brussels
- 1998: Voyage, Museé de Valence, Valence, France.
- 1998: La mer n'est pas la terre, Le Criée, Rennes, France
- 1998: Port and Corridor: Work Sites in Los Angeles: Robbert Flick and Allan Sekula, Getty Research Institute, Los Angeles, CA
- 1998: Scratches on the Surface of Things, Museum Boymans van Beuningen, Rotterdam, Netherlands
- 1999: Trace: Liverpool Biennial. Liverpool, UK
- 1999: Fish Story, Henry Art Gallery, Seattle, Washington
- 2000: Seascape, Christopher Grimes Gallery, Santa Monica, CA
- 2000: Flight Patterns, Museum of Contemporary Art, Los Angeles, CA
- 2000: Charm Offensive, Korean Cultural Center, Los Angeles, CA
- 2000: Desert and Transit, Kunsthalle zu Kiel, Kiel, Germany
- 2000: Die Regierung/The Government, Alte Kestner Gesellschaft, Hanover, Germany
- 2000: Rotterdam Foto Biennial, Museum Boymans van Beuningen, Rotterdam, Netherlands
- 2000: Titanic's wake, CCC, Tours, France; Christopher Grimes Gallery, Santa Monica, CA (solo)
- 2001: School is a Factory *1978/80, Ecole Régionale des Beaux-Arts, Valence, France (solo)
- 2001: Dead Letter Office, CEPA Gallery, Buffalo, New York (solo)
- 2001: Galerie Michel Rein, Paris (solo)
- 2001: Titanic's wake (curated by Jürgen Bock), Centro Cultural de Belém, Lisbon, Portugal (solo)
- 2001: Trade - Waren, Wege und Werte im Welthandel heute, Fotomuseum Winterthur, Switzerland
- 2001: Contemporary moments, MACBA, Barcelona, Spain
- 2001: Fin de la classe ouvrière?, Centre photographique de Cherbourg-Octeville, France
- 2001: Antagonismes. Casos d'estudi, Museu d'Art Contemporain de Barcelone, Barcelona, Spain
- 2001: Yokohama *2001, International Triennale of Contemporary Art, Yokohama, Japan (cat.)
- 2001: Yokohama Triennale, Yokohama, Japan
- 2001: Visual Worlds, Richard L. Nelson Gallery, UC Davis, Davis, California
- 2001: Open City: Street Photography Since *1950, MoMA Oxford, England
- 2002: Open City: Street Photography Since *1950, Hirshhorn Museum, Washington, D.C.
- 2002: Open City, Museo de Bellas Artes de Bilbao, Bilbao, Spain
- 2002: shadow Festival 3, Amsterdam, Netherlands (cat.)
- 2002: Trade - Waren, Wege und Werte im Welthandel heute, Nederlands Foto Instituut, Rotterdam, Netherlands
- 2002: Regarder la mer. Repenser le monde, Le Grand Café, St-Nazaire, France
- 2002: Sans commune mesure, Centre national de la photographie, Paris; Musée d'Art Moderne, Lille Métropole, Villeneuve d'Ascq, France; Le Fresnoy, Studio national des arts contemporains, Tourcoing, France
- 2002: Empire State, Whitney Museum, New York City
- 2002: The Politics of Place, BildMuseet, Umea Universitet, Sweden (cat.)
- 2002: Fish Story, Dokumenta XI, Kassel, Germany (cat.)
- 2002: Waiting for Tear Gas (white globe to black), Camera Austria, Graz, Austria (solo)
- 2002: Irrational Exuberance, Christopher Grimes Gallery, Santa Monica, CA (solo)
- 2003: Allan Sekula, Performance under Working Conditions, Generali Foundation, Vienna, Austria. Retrospective exhibit with catalogue interview by Benjamin Buchloh (solo)
- 2003: Black Tide/Marea Negra, Christopher Grimes Gallery, Santa Monica, CA (solo)
- 2003: The politics of Place, The Finnish Museum of Photography, Helsinki, Finland; Länsmusteet Västernorrland, Härnösand, Sweden
- 2003: Singuliers voyages, Domaine départemental de Chamarande, Chamarande
- 2003: Vigo Visions. Coleccion fotografica do concello de Vigo, Museo de Arte Contemporaneo de Vigo, Spain
- 2003: Witness. Contemporary Artists Document Our Time, Barbican Art, London
- 2003: Histoires contemporaines, Les *20 ans des Frac, Frac Rhônes-Alpes, Villeurbanne, France
- 2003: Contemporary Photography from the Harn Museum Collection, University of Florida, Gainesville, Florida
- 2003: AT WORK: The Art of California Labor, San Francisco State University Fine Arts Gallery, San Francisco, CA
- 2003: After the news, Postmedia Documentaries, Centre de Cultura Contemporània de Barcelona, Barcelona, Spain
- 2003: Collecció MACBA, Museu d'Art Contemporani de Barcelona, Barcelona, Spain
- 2003: High Tide, Henry Art Gallery, Seattle, Washington
- 2004: The Quiet in the Land, Luang Prabang, Laos
- 2004: Jamaica Flux: Workspace & Windows, Jamaica Center for Arts & Learning, Jamaica, Queens, New York City
- 2004: The Big Nothing, Institute of Contemporary Art, Philadelphia, Pennsylvania
- 2004: The L.A. Years, Part 1, 25th Anniversary Exhibition, Christopher Grimes Gallery, Santa Monica, CA
- 2004: reGenerations: Environmental Art in California, Armory Center for the Arts, Pasadena, California
- 2004: Die Universität ist eine Fabrik, Kunstraum der Universität Lüneburg, curators: Roger M. Buergel, Ruth Noack, Lüneburg, Germany
- 2004: Conditions urbaines, galerie Donzévansaanen, Lausanne, Switzerland
- 2004: Diaporama 04, MACBA, Barcelona, Spain
- 2004: U-topia, Frac Centre, Orléans, France
- 2004: Paysages Invisibles, Musée départemental d'art contemporain de Rochechouart, France
- 2004: L'Ombre du temps, galerie nationale du Jeu de Paume, Paris
- 2004: How do we want to be governed ? (curated by Roger M. Buergel and Ruth Noack), Miami Art Central
- 2004: Situations Construites, Attitudes, Geneva, Switzerland
- 2004: Prayer for the Americans, Galerie Michel Rein, Paris (solo)
- 2004: Freeway to China & Black Tide/Marea negra, National Museum, Zadar, Croatia (solo)
- 2004: Titanic's Wake, Harn Museum, Gainesville, Florida (solo)
- 2005: Shipwreck and Workers, STUK Kunstcentrum, Leuven, Belgium (solo)
- 2005: Shipwreck and Workers: Verson 2 for Leuven, STUK Arts Center, Leuven, Belgium (solo)
- 2005: Titanic's wake, Camera Austria/Kunsthaus Graz, Graz, Austria (solo)
- 2005: Aerospace Folktales, Christopher Grimes Gallery, Santa Monica, CA (solo)
- 2005: Shipwreck and Workers, Museum in Progress, Vienna, Austria (solo)
- 2005: Occupying Space, TENT Centrum Beeldende Kunst, Rotterdam, Netherlands
- 2005: How do we want to be governed? (Figure and Ground), Miami Art Central, Miami, Florida
- 2005: Emergencies, MUSAC (Museo de Arte Contemporaneo de Castilla y Leon), Madrid, Spain
- 2005: Facing the Music, the gallery at REDCAT in Disney Hall, Los Angeles, CA
- 2005: Dear Bill Gates (poster version) installed throughout Leuven in conjunction with Meunier, a dialogue. Contemporary art meets Constantin Meunier and Leuven, Belgium
- 2005: Inward OUTward, FLACC - Casino Modern, Belgium
- 2005: In the Poem about Love you didn't write the word Love, Center for Contemporary Arts, Glasgow, Scotland, UK
- 2006: From Mini-FM to hacktivists: A Guide to Art and Activism, Govett-Brewster Art Gallery, New Plymouth, New Zealand
- 2006: Carnets du Sous-Sol, galerie Michel Rein, Paris
- 2006: Concept has never meant horse, Generali Foundation, Vienna, Austria
- 2006: Los Angeles *1955-*1985, Centre Georges Pompidou, Paris
- 2006: Allan Sekula, Fish Story Chapter One, FRAC Bretagne, Maison de l'Etudiant, Université du Havre, Havre
- 2006: Dark Places, Santa Monica Museum of Art, Santa Monica, CA
- 2006: Full House: Views of the Whitney's Collection at 75, Whitney Museum, New York City
- 2006: The Quiet in the Land, Luang Prabang, Laos (solo)
- 2006: In the Poem about Love You Don't Write the Word Love, Artists Space, New York City
- 2006: Busan Biennale *2006: Everywhere, Busan, South Korea
- 2007: John Q. Public and Citizen Jane: Private Americans in the Political Domain, San Diego State University, San Diego, California
- 2007: Shipwreck and Workers, Christopher Grimes Gallery, Santa Monica, CA (solo)
- 2007: Informacion contra informacion, Centro Galego de Arte Contemporanea, Santiago de Compostela, Spain
- 2007: MACBA in Frankfurter Kunstverein, Frankfurt am Main, Germany
- 2007: In the poem about love, you don't write the word love, Overgaden, Institut for Samtidskunst, Copenhagen, Denmark
- 2007: World Factory (curated by Hou Hanru), San Francisco Art Institute, San Francisco, CA
- 2007: For a special place: documents and works from the Generali Foundation, Austrian Cultural Forum, New York City
- 2007: Collection, Generali Foundation, Vienna, Austria
- 2007: The Quiet in The Land, Luang Prabang, Laos
- 2007: UN/Fair Trade, Neue Galerie Graz am Landesmuseum Joanneum, Graz, Austria (curated by P. Weibel & G. Holler-Schuster)
- 2007: Existencias, MUSAC (Museo de Arte Contemporáneo de Castilla y León), Spain
- 2007: Documenta XII, Kassel, Germany
- 2007: L'Europe en devenir, Centre Culturel Suisse, Paris (curated by Michel Ritter)
- 2007: 10th Istanbul Biennial, Istanbul, Turkey
- 2008: Lost Paradise, Zentrum Paul Klee, Bern, Switzerland
- 2008: Travailler plus pour gagner plus, galerie Michel Rein, Paris (solo)
- 2008: Polonia and Other Fables, Renaissance Society, Chicago, Illinois, Autumn *2008 (solo)
- 2008: Edit Nine, commissioned work to coincide with This Side of Paradise, The Huntington, San Marino, California
- 2008: The Quiet in the Land, Luang Prabang, Laos
- 2008: Universal Archive: The Condition of the Document and the Modern Photographic Utopia, MACBA, Barcelona, Spain
- 2008: No Room, curated by Sharon Johnston and Mark Lee, Christopher Grimes Gallery, Santa Monica, CA
- 2008: Street Art, Street Life (curated by Lydia Yee), Bronx Museum of the Arts, Bronx, New York.
- 2008: The Way Things Are, Thyssen-Bornemisza Art Contemporary, Vienna, Austria
- 2009: Polonia, Renaissance Society, Chicago, Illinois
- 2009: San Diego, Cardwell Jimmerson Contemporary Art, Culver City, California
- 2009: Zachęta Gallery, Warsaw, May–June *2009 (retrospective) (solo)
- 2009: Les Tubes, group show, Le Quai, Angers, France
- 2009: Retrospective, Zachęta Gallery, Warsaw, Poland (solo)
- 2010: European Cross-curating, station 2 (curated by Jūrgen Bock), artist residency and solo show in
- 2011: La Criée, Centre d'Art Contemporain, Rennes, France (solo)
- 2010: Les Tubes, group show, Le Quai, Angers, France
- 2010: Berlin-Paris Un échange de Galeries - galerie Michel Rein @ Carlier I Gebauer, Berlin, Germany
- 2010: Global Design, Museum für gestaltung, Zurich, Switzerland
- 2010: "…In A Most Dangerous Manner", SPACES Gallery, Cleveland, Ohio
- 2010: How Many Billboards?, MAK Center, Los Angeles, CA
- 2010: Nether Land, Witte de With Center for Contemporary Art at the Dutch Cultural Center, Shanghai, China
- 2010: Media City Seoul *2010, 6th Seoul International Biennale of Media Art, Seoul, South Korea
- 2010: Ship of Fools, Museum van Hedendaagse Kunst Antwerpen, Antwerp, Belgium
- 2010: Allan Sekula: Polonia and Other Fables, Ludwig Museum, Budapest, Hungary
- 2010: This Ain't China, e-flux, New York City
- 2010: Taipei Biennial *2010, Taipei Fine Arts Museum, Taipei, Taiwan
- 2010: The Image In Question. War-Media-Art, Carpenter Center for Visual Arts, Harvard University, Cambridge, Massachusetts
- 2010: Ship of Fools, 29th Biennial de São Paulo, São Paulo, Brazil
- 2010: En cada instante, ruptura, Sala de Arte Publico Siqueiros, Mexico City, Mexico
- 2010: Les Rencontres d'Arte Contemporain, La Chantrerie, Cahors, France
- 2010: Là où nous sommes - oeuvres de la Collection Neuflize Vie, Maison d'art Bernard Anthonioz, Nogent-sur-Marne, France
- 2010: The Forgotten Space, Nederlands Film festival, Utrecht, Netherlands; Viennale, Vienna, Austria; Doclisboa, Lisbon, Portugal
- 2010: Le peuple qui manque, Centre Pompidou, France
- 2010: Antiphotojournalism, La Virreina Centre de la Image, Barcelona, Spain
- 2011: Serious Games. War – Media – Art, Institute Mathildenhöhe Darmstadt, Germany
- 2011: *1979, a movement to radical moments (curated by Carles Guerra), La Virreina, Centre de la Imatge, Barcelona, Spain
- 2011: Angry, Young and Radical, Nederlands Fotomuseum, Rotterdam, Netherlands
- 2011: oceanomania: souvenirs des mers mystérieuses, de l'expédition à l'aquarium (curated by Mark Dion), Nouveau Musée National de Monaco, Monaco.
- 2011: L'énigme du portrait, Neuflize collection, Musée d'art contemporain de Marseille, France
- 2011: ZZNot for sale, Passage de Retz, Paris
- 2011: Retrospective of Sekula films, Palau de la Virreina, Barcelona, Spain (solo)
- 2011: Polonia and Other Fables, cur. Karen Downey, Belfast Exposed, Belfast, Northern Ireland (solo)
- 2011: Ship of Fools, cur. Kirsten Lloyd, Stills Center for Photography, Edinburgh, Scotland, UK (solo)
- 2011: Polonia and…, Galerie Michel Rein, Paris (solo)
- 2011: California Stories, Christopher Grimes Gallery, Santa Monica, California (solo)
- 2012: The Dockers Museum (curated by Jürgen Bock), La Criée centre d'art contemporain, Rennes, France (solo)
- 2012: Allan Sekula: Disassembled Movies *1972–*2012, Akbank Art Center (curated by Marie Muracciole and Ali Akay), Istanbul, Turkey (solo)
- 2012: Black Tide, Museo de Arte Contemporánea de Vigo, Spain (solo)
- 2012-2013: Californian Sequences, solo show (curated by Marie Muracciole), Galerie Michel Rein, Paris (solo)
- 2013: Balea Negra (curated by Pedro de Llano), group show, Museo de Arte Contemporeana de Vigo, Vigo, Spain
- 2013: Uchronie, ou des récits de collection, group show (curated by Le Bureau), Saline Royale, Senans, France
- 2013: Learning for Life, group show, Henie Onstad Art Center, Oslo, Norway
- 2013: Voices of the Sea, group show, Musée des Beaux-arts de Calais, Calais, France
- 2013: Critical Episodes (*1957-*2011), group show, Barcelona, Spain
- 2013: This ain't China, solo show (curated by Bill Jeffries), Simon Fraser University Gallery, Vancouver, British Columbia, Canada (solo)
- 2013: The Dockers' Museum (curated by Jürgen Bock), Lumiar Cité, Lisbon, Portugal (solo)
- 2013: Mécaniques des fluides, group show curated by Marie Muracciole, Gallery Cécile Fakhoury, Abidjan, Ivory Coast

== Collections ==
Sekula's work is held in the following public collections:

- Thyssen-Bornemisza Art Contemporary Collection, Vienna, Austria
- Museo de Arte Reina Sofia, Madrid, Spain
- Museu d'Art Contemporani de Barcelona, Barcelona, Spain
- Museum Boijmans Van Beuningen, Rotterdam, Netherlands
- Museum of Contemporary Art, Los Angeles, CA
- National Museum of Contemporary Art, Athens, Greece
- Columbus Museum of Art, Columbus, Ohio
- Orange County Museum of Art, Newport Beach, CA
- Pompidou Center, Paris
- San Diego Museum of Contemporary Art, La Jolla, CA
- San Diego Museum of Contemporary Art, La Jolla, CA
- Whitney Museum, New York
- Art Gallery of New South Wales, Sydney, Australia
- ARCO Foundation, Madrid, Spain
- Centro de Estudos Fotograficos, Vigo, Spain
- Folkwang Museum, Essen, Germany
- Fonds National d'Art Contemporain, Paris
- Getty Research Institute, Resource Collections, Los Angeles, CA
- Harn Museum of Art, Gainesville, Florida
- Los Angeles County Museum of Art, Los Angeles, CA
- Museé des Beaux Arts et de la Dentelle, Calais, France
- Museo de Arte Contemporaneo, Castilla y León, Spain

== See also ==
- Allan Sekula Library at the Clark Art Institute
