= Allan Sekula Library at the Clark Art Institute =

Archival and research library in Massachusetts, USA

Coordinates: 42.707889°N 73.213985°W

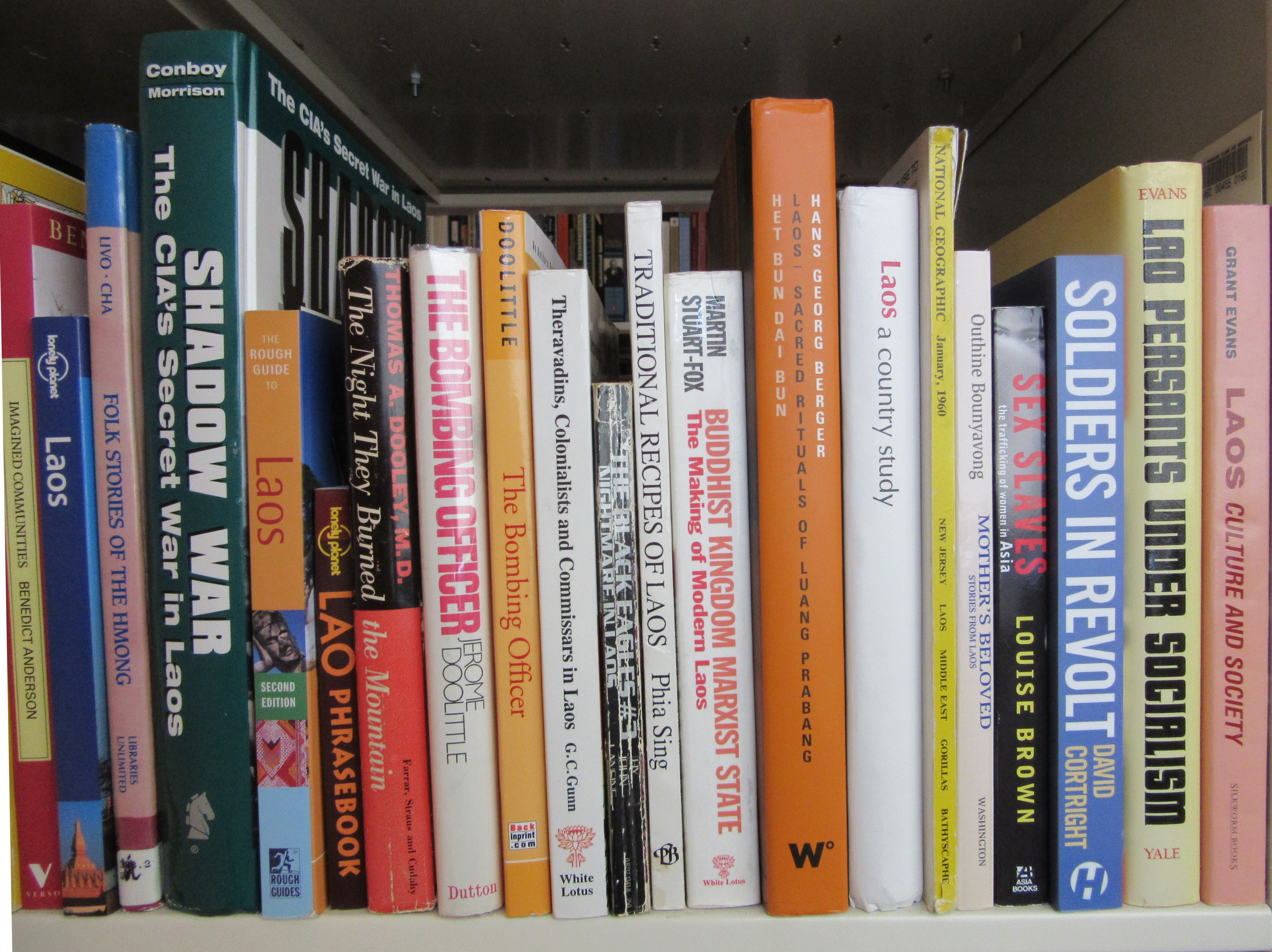
Laos research volumes A Short Film for Laos (2006): Allan Studio Book Room

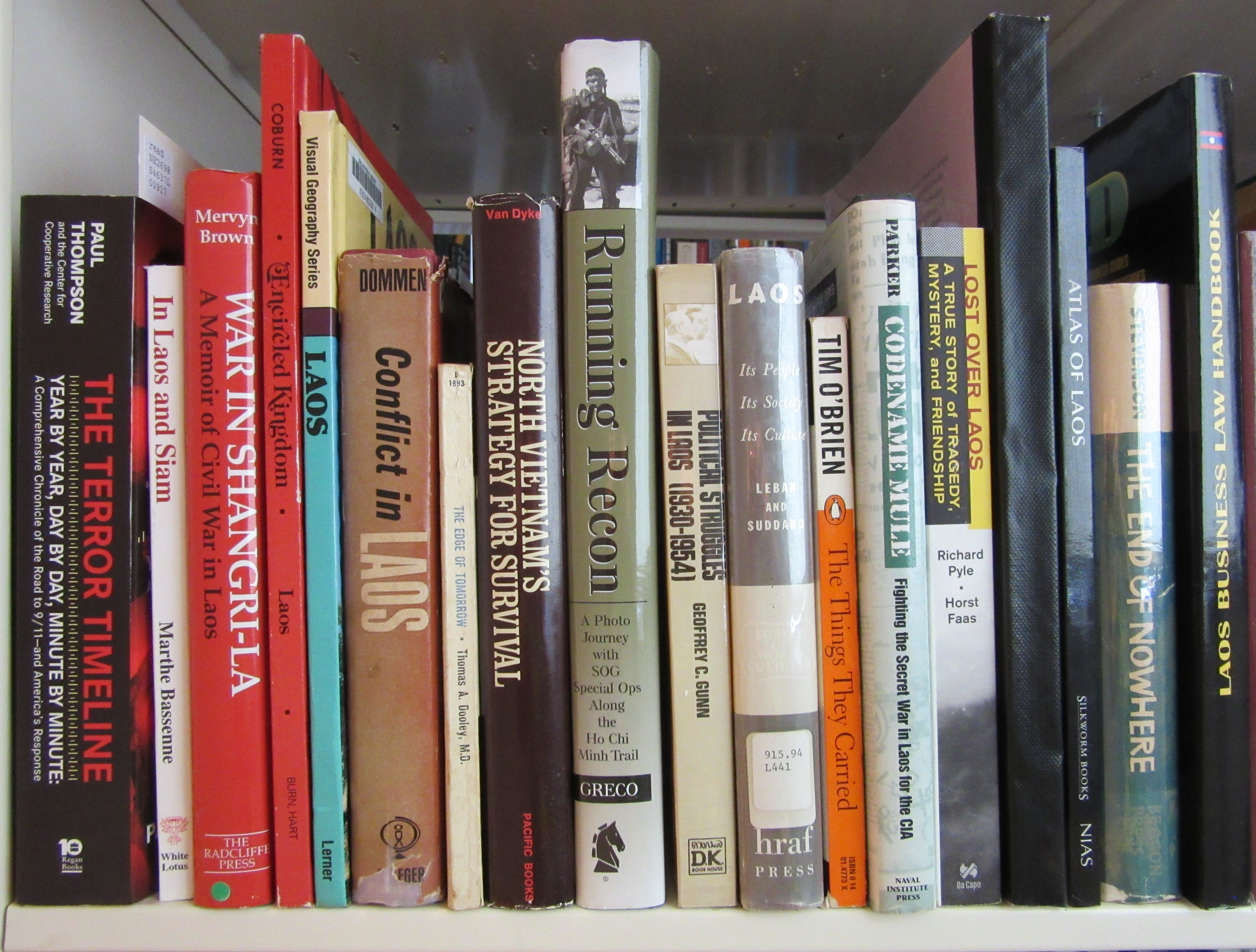
Vietnam and Laos research volumes: Allan Studio Book Room

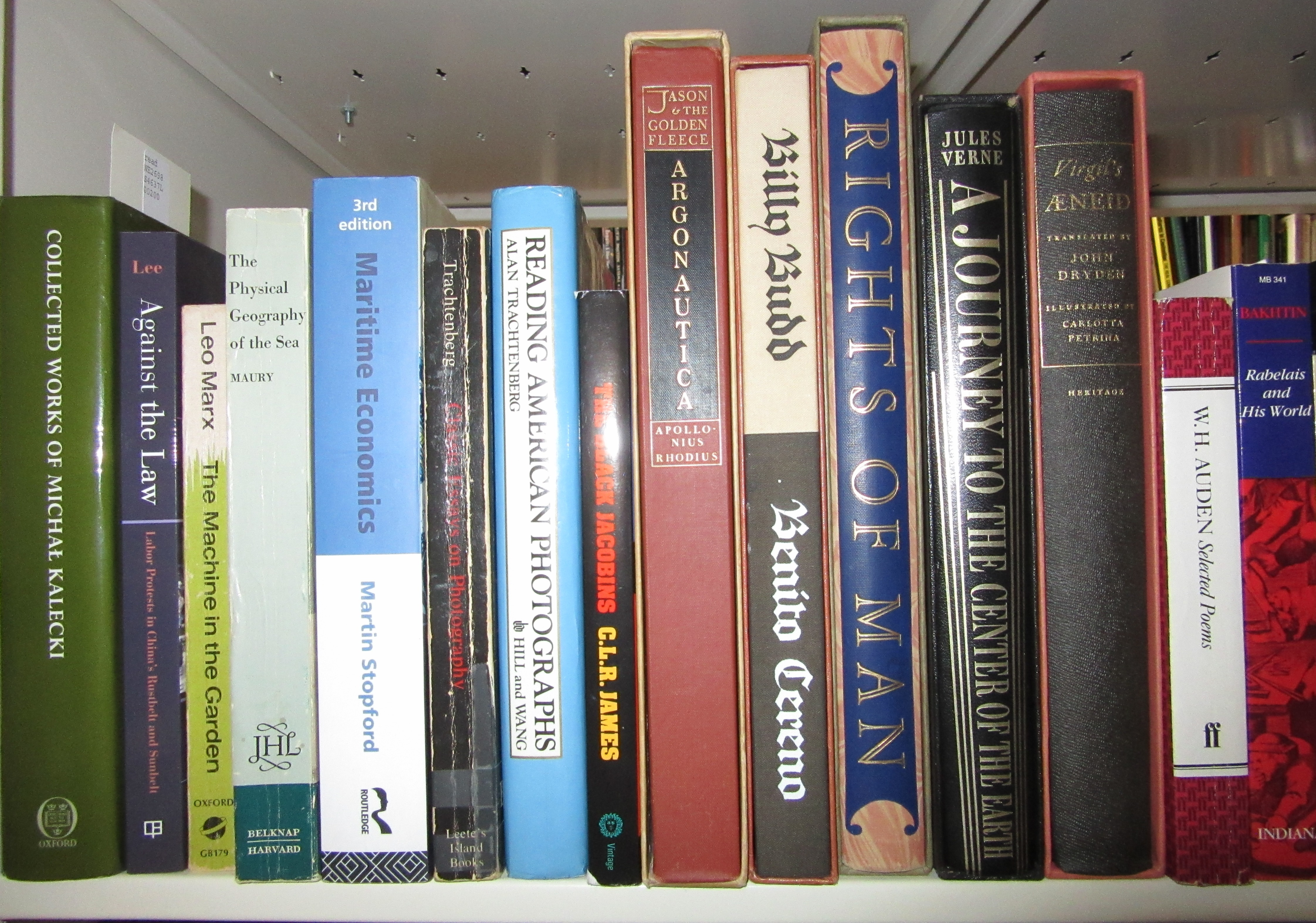
Several family library volumes (classics in slip cases) referenced in Aerospace Folktales. "Every two weeks a new edition of great literature would arrive. The engineer offered his children a dollar for every book they read."

The Allan Sekula Library is an archival and research collection of volumes, which is held in the Library of the Clark Art Institute. In 2015, the library of the Clark Art Institute acquired The Allan Sekula Library from the artist's widow, art historian and professor Sally Stein. The library comprises a collection of 15,000 volumes, which were assembled by the artist over the course of his career.

A thoughtful and thought-provoking artist, photographer, filmmaker, and writer, Allan Sekula (1951-2013) was equally recognized as a public intellectual, art critic and theoretist, and for the social commentary, criticism, and activism that informed his life and work. Allan was a member of the Photography and Media Program faculty at California Institute of the Arts from 1985 until his death in 2013, and is well remembered as a generous and supportive teacher.

As installed in the Manton Center Reading Room, The Allan Sekula Library reflects his organization of the books throughout the household spaces and studio. Allan organized and displayed his books according to research interest; collecting both rare, classic and current titles as pertinent to his project topic. As an example, his many volumes on Laos and the Vietnam War were found in close proximity on shelves in the Allan Studio Book Room. Allan researched these topics by including novels, travel guides, language primers, and recipe books, as well as volumes related to political and social analysis. Subjects in his library were never assigned to one shelf; his thought and research processes resulted in shelf order which comingled subjects and demonstrated his cross-references. The titles and shelf order in his studio, study, bedroom and garden shed all exemplify the depth of his investigations into projects concepts.

== Collection strengths ==
Amassed over decades, The Allan Sekula Library reflects the artist's personal and professional interests. In addition to volumes on contemporary art and photography, the collection has particular strengths in titles treating social justice, economic disparities, consumerism, the history of the workers movement, maritime history, and the destruction of natural and built environments. The Sekula Library reflects the artist's prolific body of work – revolving around issues of labor and the aesthetic and economic traffic in images bound up with the processes of globalization. These volumes supported Sekula's various projects, including his germinal studies The Traffic in Photographs (1981), Photography Against the Grain (1984), and The Body and the Archive (1986); films such as Tsukiji (2001) and A Short Film for Laos (2007), and the award-winning film project about the consequences of global shipping, The Forgotten Space (2010), and multi-format projects including Fish Story (1995), TITANIC’s Wake (2001), and Polonia and Other Fables (2009).

== Accessibility ==
The majority of the 15,000 volume collection is shelved in the Manton Research Center's reading room, with select titles accessible upon request in the Clark library. It is necessary for researchers to telephone, email, or write in advance of their visit; contact information is located on the home page. Collection titles can be viewed in the Library Catalog.

== Gallery ==
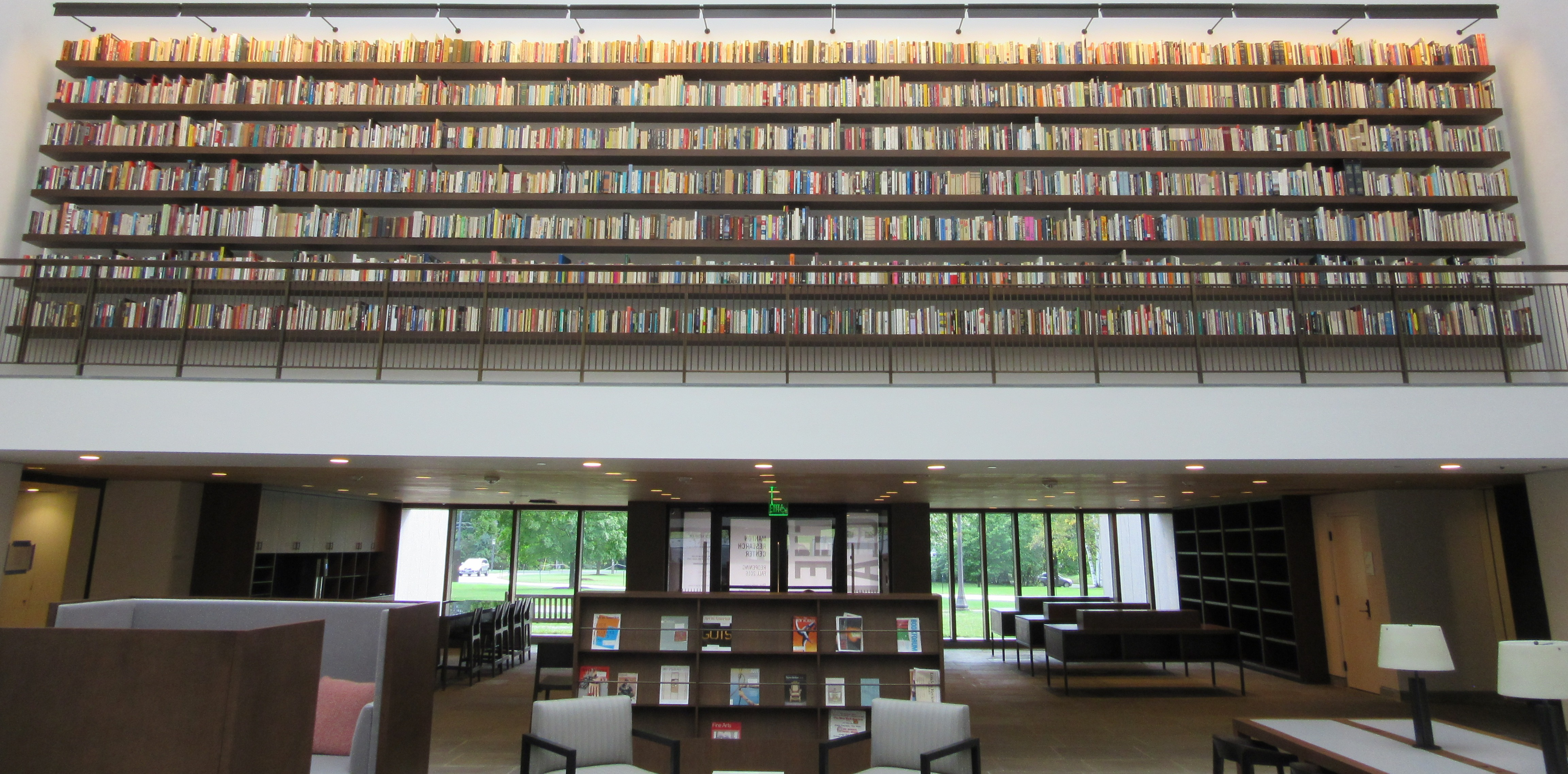
Allan Sekula Library installed on the East Wall of the Manton Research Center

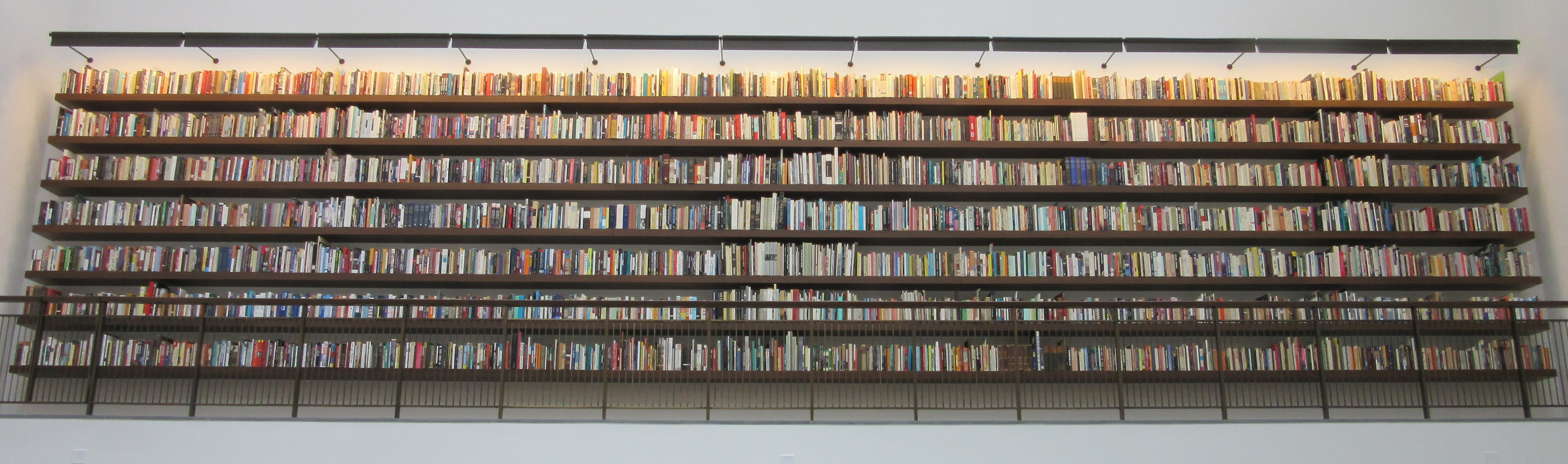
Allan Sekula Library installed on the West Wall of the Manton Research Center

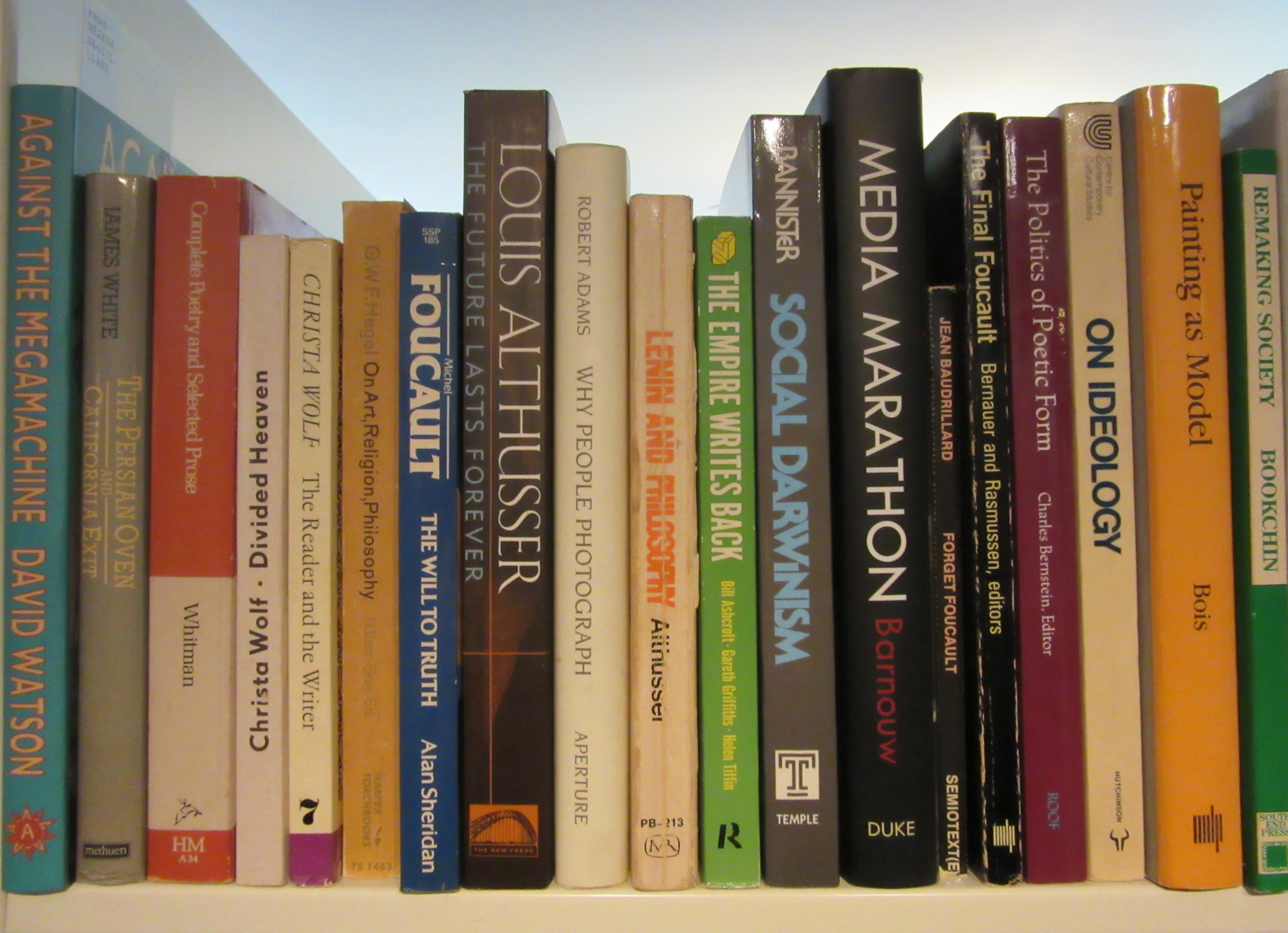
Philosophy

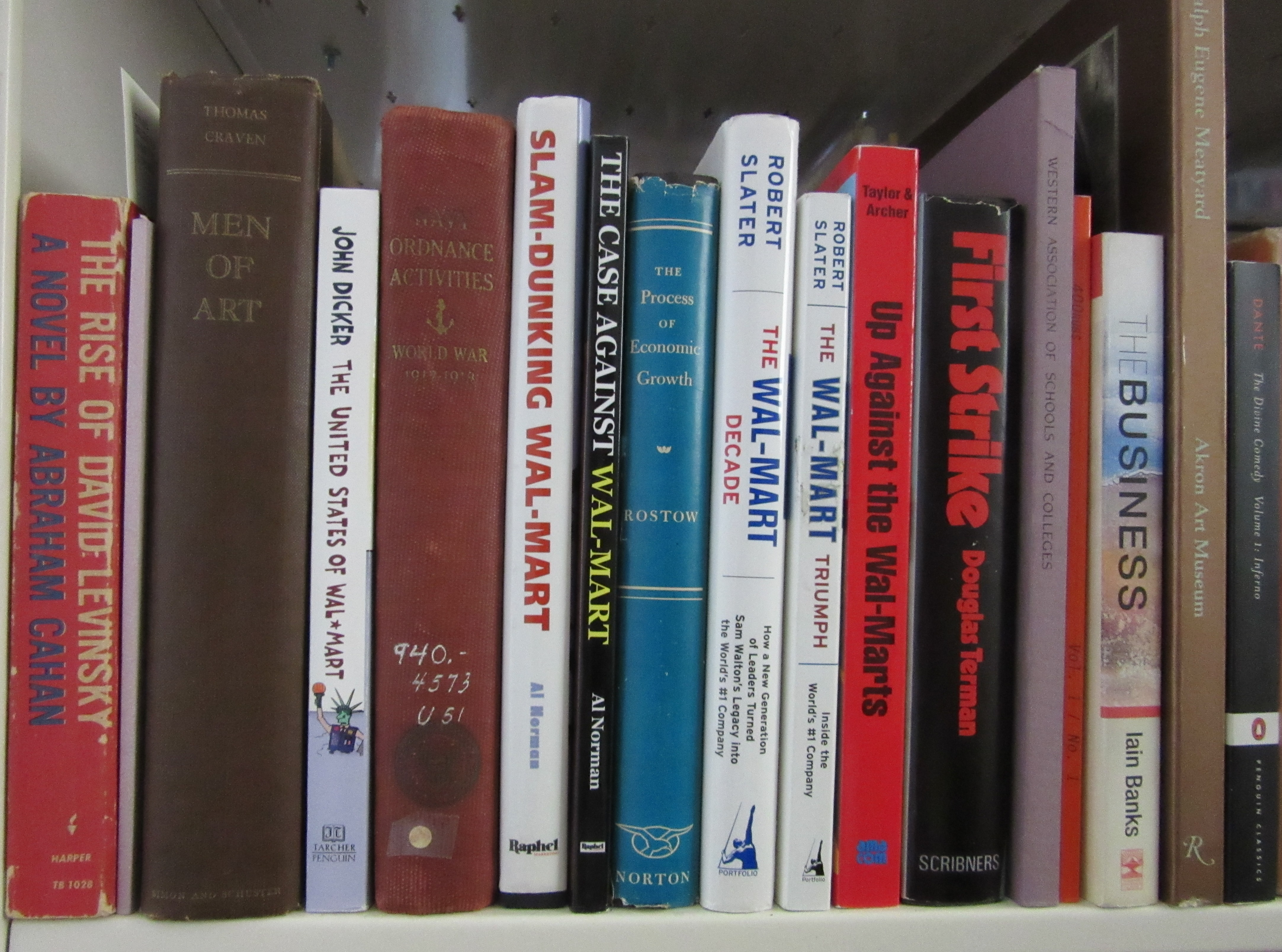
Business and Walmart

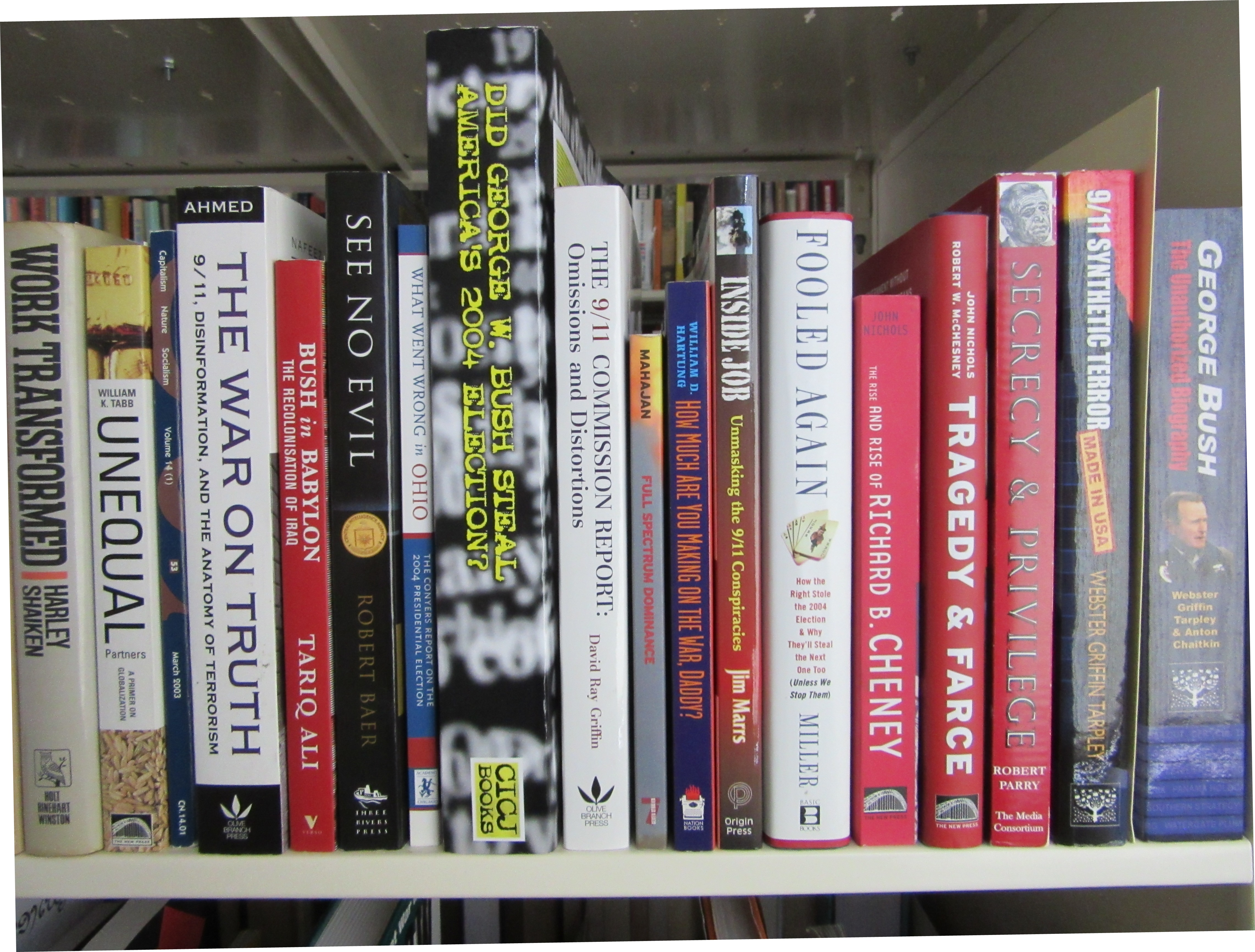
George W Bush and 911 research volumes

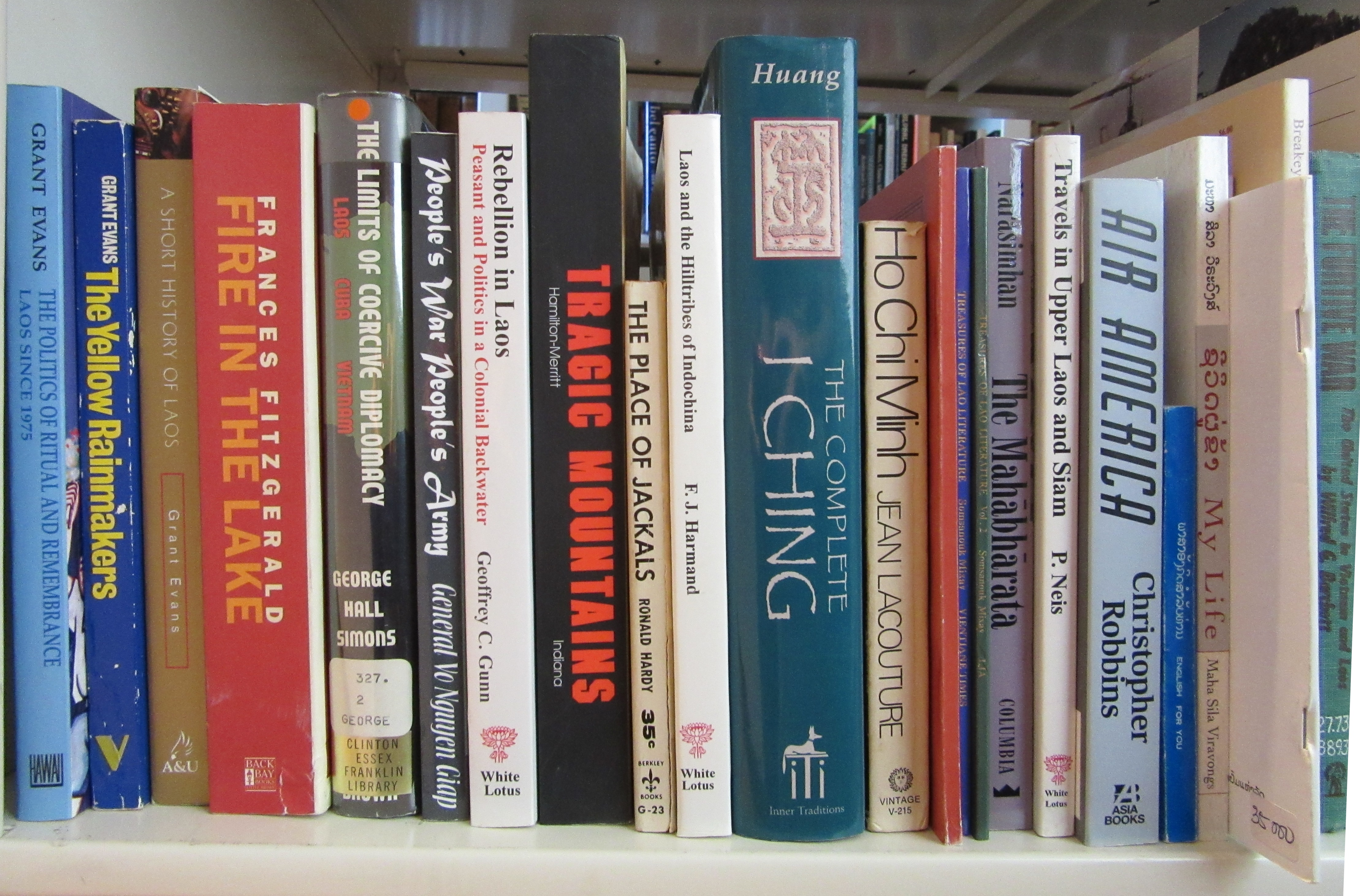
Vietnam and Laos research volumes

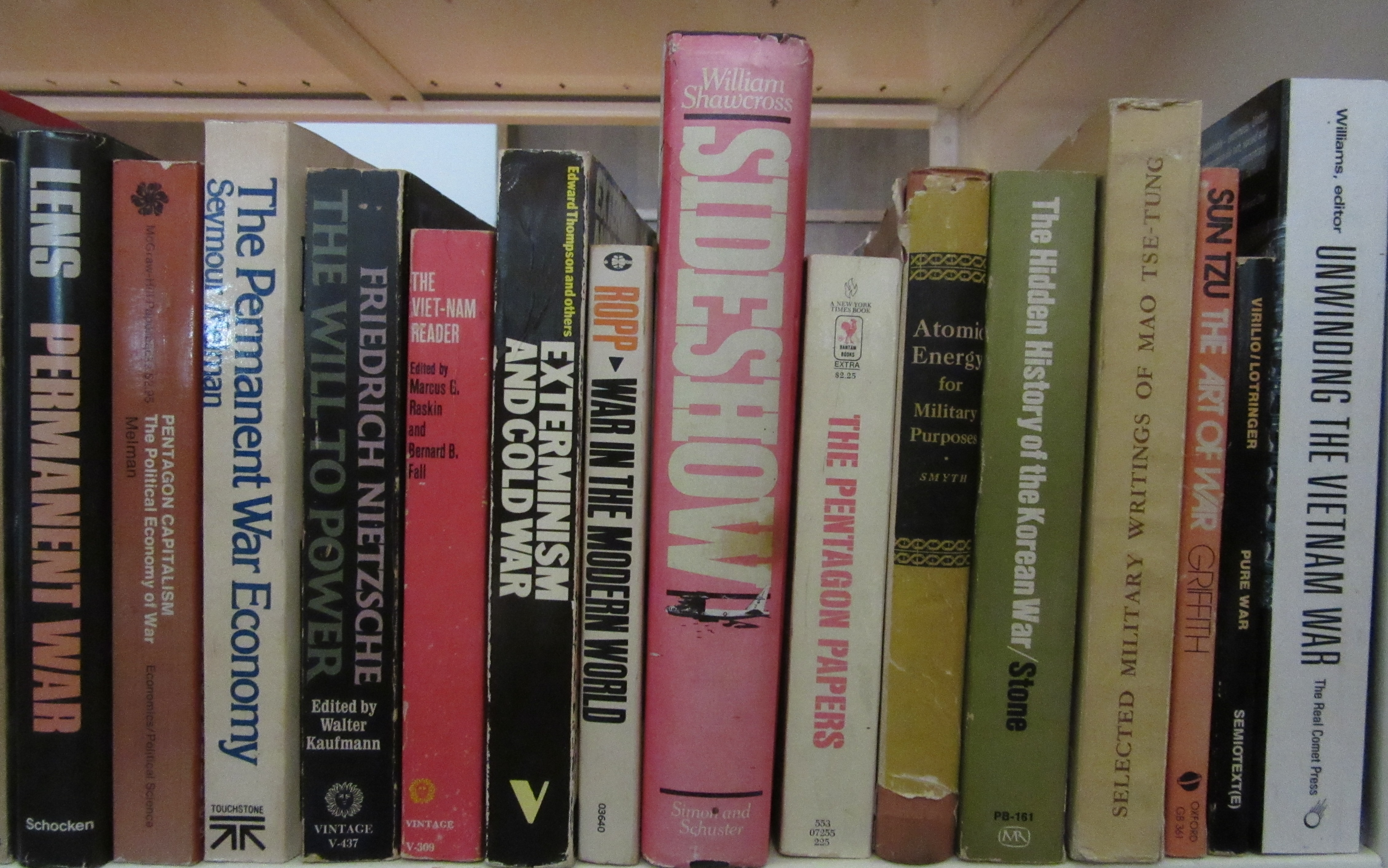
War research volumes

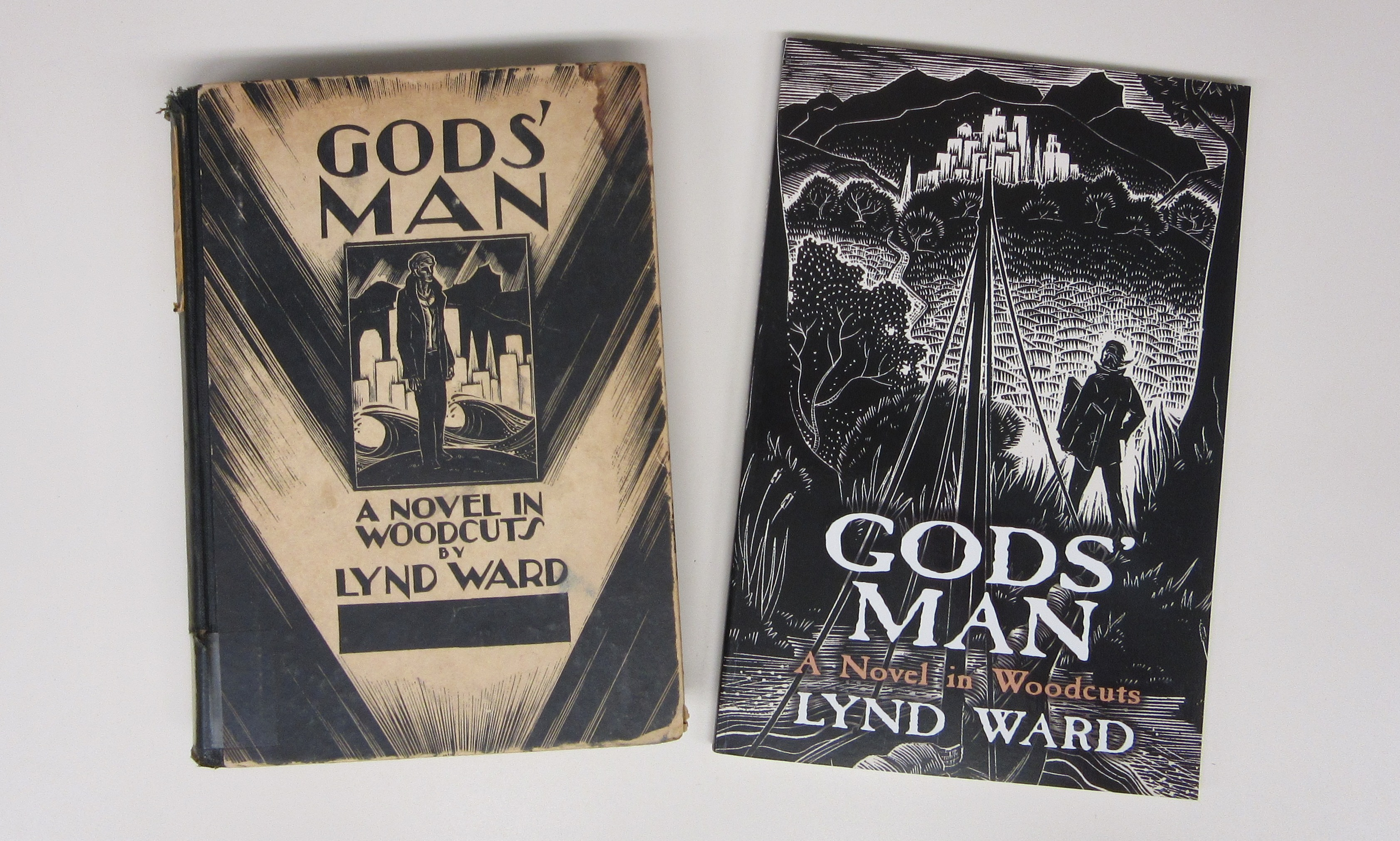
Graphic novel; rare and reprint copy
