= Frédéric Paul =

French curator and writer (born 1959)

Frédéric Paul (born in 1959) is a French curator and writer who works and lives in Vannes and Paris, France.

== Career ==
Paul was former director of the F.R.A.C. Limousin (Limoges, France) from 1990 to 2000, and of the Domaine de Kerguéhennec from 2000 to 2010. Since he curated exhibitions of Guy de Cointet (2011) and Beatriz Milhazes: Panamericano. Paintings 1999–2012 (2012) at the Fundación Costantini, Buenos Aires and Meu Bem (2013) at the Centro Cultural Paço Imperial, Rio de Janeiro, among others.

Paul is currently curator at the National Museum of Modern Art (Musée National d'Art Moderne) at the Centre Georges Pompidou.

== Other activities ==
In 2016, Paul was a member of the jury which selected Njideka Akunyili Crosby as recipient of the Prix Canson.

== Bibliography (selection) ==
- "La bibliothèque de l'instituteur, Hubert Duprat, l'archéologie et la macération" (reprint), Hubert Duprat, Les écrits restent, Paris : éditions MF, 2020. ISBN 978-2-37804-020-8
- Points de rencontres, Paris : Centre Pompidou, 2019. ISBN 978-2-84426-858-7
- Dorothy Iannone, Toujours de l'audace !, Paris : Manuella éditions, 2019. ISBN 978-2-490505-11-1
- "William Wegman : architecte en tous genres", Les Cahiers du Musée national d’art moderne, n° 149, Paris : Centre Georges Pompidou, 2019.
- Barbara Probst : The Moment in Space, Stuttgart-Paris : Hartmann Books, Le Bal, 2019. ISBN 978-3-96070-035-7
- "Homme à tout faire et propre à rien, le silence de Robert Walser est surestimé", Robert Walser, Grosse kleine Welt - Petit grand monde, Paris : Beaux-Arts de Paris éditions, 2019. ISBN 978-2-84056-686-1
- "Un numéro monstre / From Distraction to Displacement : The Collages of Beatriz Milhazes", Beatriz Milhazes, Collages, Rio de Janeiro : Editora Cobogó, 2018. ISBN 978-85-5591-064-7
- "Monk et Boetti ou l’esprit de famille", Les Cahiers du Musée national d’art moderne, n° 143, éd. Centre Georges Pompidou, Paris, 2018.
- Steven Pippin / Aberration optique, Paris : éd. Xavier Barral, 2017. ISBN 978-2-36511-135-5
- Sarah Morris: Capital Letters Rear Better for Initials, Berlin: August Verlag, 2015. ISBN 978-3-941360-46-4
- Guy de Cointet, Paris: Flammarion, 2014. ISBN 978-2-08130-743-8
- Giuseppe Penone: Archéologie, Paris: Actes Sud Editions, 2014. ISBN 978-2-33003-012-4
- Beatriz Milhazes, Meu Bem, Rio de Janeiro: Base7 Projetos Culturais, 2013. ISBN 978-85-62094-12-5
- Mel Bochner, Bignan: Domaine de Kerguehennec, 2009 ISBN 978-2-90657-415-1
- Shirley Jaffe - I work when I can, preferably in the day time, Bignan: Domaine de Kerguehennec, 2008 ISBN 978-2-906574-09-0
- Richard Artschwager: Step to Entropy, Bignan: Domaine de Kerguehennec, 2004 ISBN 978-2-90657-404-5
- Jonathan Monk, Bignan: Domaine de Kerguehennec, 2003 ISBN 978-2-90657-406-9
- Glenn Brown, 2001, Bignan: Domaine de Kerguehennec, 2003 ISBN 978-2-90657-400-7
- Claude Closky, Paris: Hazan, 1999. ISBN 978-2-85025-680-6
- William Wegman : dessins/drawings, 1973-1997, Limoges: Frac Limousin, 1997. ISBN 2-908257-22-X
- Le Plus grand espace, Paris: Maeght, 1994. ISBN 978-2-86941-254-5
