= Karen Chekerdjian =

Lebanese-Armenian designer and artist

- Born: 1970 (age 55–56); Beirut, Lebanon
- Occupations: Designer, Artist
- Website: www.karenchekerdjian.com

Karen Chekerdjian is a Lebanese-Armenian designer and artist who was born in Beirut, Lebanon. After having started a career in the design and advertising sectors, Chekerdjian moved to Milan to study Industrial Design at the Domus Academy from which she graduated in 1997. Her Mentor was Massimo Morozzi, founder of Archizoom Associati.

== Work ==
After her graduation, Karen Chekerdjian remained in Milan for a few years. During this period, she created "Mobil", a suspended hanger system that was edited by Edra.

She has collaborated with Icelandic artist Tinna Gunnarsdóttir on ball-shaped storage units entitled "Rolling Stones".

After several years spent in Italy, Chekerdjian came back to work in Lebanon in 2001. She has helped establish a local design scene and became a pioneer in the field throughout the region.

She has established her design studio in Beirut in 2001.

Karen Chekerdjian's work is both inspired by Levantine traditions and motivated by challenges posed by the lack of industry in the region. The limited tradition of product manufacturing in Lebanon made her focus shift towards new ways of creating. Chekerdjian explains that meaning is necessary in her work for it not to remain purely about functionality and aesthetics. Each piece of her work is connected in some way to the piece before it. Each piece she conceives is the result of close collaboration and constant interaction with craftsmen.

Chekerdjian explores the idea of function-based metamorphism. Her objects are in a perpetual state of change and mutation. Multifaced shapes and full volumes, precise finishes, are the common denominator of her creations.

She has taken part in several international exhibitions, amongst which Utopi (Copenhagen), Beyond the Myth (a pan-European show), Promosedia 2007 (Milan), Northern Lights (Tokyo) and ECHO (Beirut) and at galleries ranging from The Issey Miyake Foundation (Tokyo) and the Spazio Orlandi Gallery and the Nilufar Gallery (Milan) and the Sfeir-Semler Gallery (Beirut).

In 2010, Chekerdjian opened the Karen Chekerdjian Store in Beirut.

In 2013, Karen Chekerdjian had her first UK solo show, entitled "Designing the Middle East:Beirut", at 19 Greek Street in London.

In 2014, Karen Chekerdjian first exhibited Trans|Form, four collections of transformed and transforming objects, at the Beirut Art Center.

In 2015, her collection of limited edition objects Trans|Form was exhibited in Design Miami Basel in June 2015 and in Design Miami in December 2015 with Carwan Gallery.

In May 2016, Karen Chekerdjian has been invited to experiment and expose her work and the Institut du Monde Arabe Museum within the framework of D'Days. Entitled "Respiration", the exhibition began on May 31 and will be open through D'Days until 28 August 2016.

In parallel to the exhibition in the Institut du Monde Arabe, Chekerdjian exhibits her works at Dutko Gallery in Paris.

== Solo exhibitions ==
- Designing the Middle East:Beirut (19 Greek Street in London) 2013
- Trans|Form (Beirut Art Center) 2014
- Trans|Form (Design Miami/ Basel) 2015
- Solo show (Design Miami) 2015
- Respiration (Institut du monde arabe Museum) 2016
- Respiration (Dutko Gallery, Paris) 2016

== Collective exhibitions ==
- Stool In The Box (Salone Satellite, Milan Furniture Fair) 2001
- Utopi (Danish Museum of Decorative Arts, Copenhagen) 2002
- Beyond The Myth (Pan-European Tour) 2003-2006
- Northern Lights (Issey Miyake Foundation, Tokyo 2004
- Research On Brass (Costantino, New York) 2005-2006
- The Disappearance of Objects (ICFF, New York) 2006
- Promosedia (Udine & Milan Spazio Orlandi) 2006- 2007
- ECHO (Galerie Sfeir-Semler, Beirut) 2008
- Volume 2(009) (Nilufar Gallery – Milan Furniture Fair) 2009
- The Future of Tradition (Hans der Kunst, Munich) 2010-2011
- Confessions (House of Today, Beirut) 2012
