= Paola Yacoub =

Paola Yacoub (born in Beirut) is an artist based in Berlin and Beirut.

== Life and work ==
Paola Yacoub studied at the Lebanese Academy of Fine Arts, and graduated from the Architectural Association School of Architecture in London in 1993. She worked at the Institut Français d’Archéologie du Proche-Orient in charge of the excavation's drawings in downtown Beirut from 1995 to 1999. She exhibited her project Affects (1998) at Univerzitav Ljubljana's gallery. She developed her artistic production in Beirut in 2000 and started a collaboration with Michel Lasserre. In 2001 and 2003 they were invited at the Akademie Schloss Solitude, Stuttgart, and in 2004/2005, they received the DAAD (Deutscher Akademischer Austausch Dienst) artist's program fellowship. Since this residency, Paola Yacoub has been living and working in Berlin and in Beirut.

== Exhibitions (selection) ==
=== Solo exhibitions ===
- 2011 Drawing with the things themselves at the Beirut Art Center (first solo show, co-curated with Corinne Diserens)
- 2012 Labor Berlin 9. Paola Yacoub: Kiss the Black Stones, Haus der Kulturen der Welt, Berlin
- 2017 A beautiful fountain in Sharjah
- 2019 Paola Yacoub Radica Grounds, Marfa' Projects, Beirut

=== Group exhibitions ===
- 2000 Stand der Dinge at the KW Kunst-Werke Institute for Contemporary Art, Berlin
- 2000 Venice Biennale
- 2002 Contemporary Arab Representations, Beirut/Lebanon, Witte de With, Rotterdam
- 2003 Venice Biennale
- 2004 Busan Korea Biennial
- 2005 After the fact, the 1st Berlin Photography Festival, Martin-Gropius-Bau
- 2006 Gwangju Biennial
- 2006 Out of Beirut, Modern Art Oxford, Oxford
- 2007 Thessaloniki Biennale
- 2008 Lebanon Now, Darat al Funun, Amman
- 2009 Shenzhen fast food, Beautiful Heart at OCAT, Shenzhen, China
- 2009 Tirana Biennial
- 2010 GLÜCK happens... at the Städtische Galerie Erlangen (2010)
- Across Boundaries. Focus on Lebanese Photography, curated by Tarek Nahas, Beirut Art Fair 2018

== Collections (selection) ==
Her works are in a number of public collections including FNAC, Paris; Musée des Beaux-Arts de Nantes; FRAC Poitoux-Charentes; Centre pour l’Image Contemporaine/Mamco, Geneva among others. For the Museion collection and opening exhibition Peripheral vision and collective body (2008), she produced the work Gio Ponti, Paradiso Del Cevedale.

== Publications ==
Her photo-essays in collaboration with Michel Lasserre were anthologized in the publication Beirut is a Magnificent City: Synoptic Tables, published by the Fundació Antoni Tàpies, Barcelona (2003) on the occasion of Contemporary Arab Representations, in which she participated, curated by Catherine David at the Barcelona Foundation, Witte de With, Rotterdam and BildMuseet, Umea.
