= Rachel Dedman =

English curator, art historian and writer

- Born: Rachel Louise Dedman; 27 October 1989 (age 36)
- Education: St John's College, Oxford
- Years active: 2013–present
- Partner: Andrew Maughan
- Children: 1
- Website: racheldedman.com

Rachel Jessica Dedman (born 17 October 1989) is an English curator, art historian and writer. As of 2019, she is Jameel Curator of Contemporary Art from the Middle East at the V&A. She is perhaps best known for curating exhibitions on tatreez for the Palestinian Museum, Kettle's Yard, The Whitworth, MoMu and more.

== Early life ==
Dedman grew up in North West London. She is of Jewish heritage. She attended North London Collegiate School. She graduated with a degree in History of Art from St John's College, Oxford. She was the 2012–2013 Von Clemm Fellow at Harvard University.

== Career ==
=== Tatreez ===
The Palestinian Museum, then led by Jack Persekian and Omar Al-Qattan, first approached Dedman in 2013 to curate a forthcoming satellite show in Beirut on tatreez due to Dedman's ability to travel between Palestine, Lebanon and Jordan for research. She worked with Widad Kawar and drew upon her and Shelagh Weir's works in addition to oral histories and interviews with embroiderers. At the Seams: A Political History of Palestinian Embroidery opened at the Dar-El Nimer cultural centre in 2016. The expanded second iteration of this project took place at the Palestinian Museum's Birzeit location in 2018 under the title Labour of Love: New Approaches to Palestinian Embroidery. Dedman also wrote the accompanying pamphlets.

Starting summer 2023, Dedman curated the exhibition Material Power: Palestinian Embroidery as part of a collaboration between Kettle's Yard in Cambridge and The Whitworth in Manchester. She also published the book Stitching the Intifada via Common Threads Press. In 2025, Dedman used the Palestinian Museum's photographic archive to curate Thread Memory, which was showcased at the Hayy Jameel in Jeddah and then the V&A Dundee. This was followed by Embroidering Palestine at MoMu Antwerp into 2026.

=== V&A ===
Upon returning to London in 2019, Dedman joined the Victoria and Albert Museum (V&A) as Jameel Curator of Contemporary Art from the Middle East. She stated she "was excited by the possibility of working less project-to-project, and by the opportunity to contribute to a museum over a longer duration". Her projects for the V&A include organising Beirut Mapped, the Jameel Prize, and the Jameel Fellowship.

=== Other exhibitions ===
In the interim, Dedman won the 2014–2015 Apexart Franchise Program, granting her the opportunity to present the exhibition Space Between Our Fingers. Also in 2016, Dedman collaborated with Marie Muracciole on Unravelled at the Beirut Art Center. She returned to Dar El-Nimer in 2017 for Midad: The Public and Intimate Lives of Arabic Calligraphy.

Back in London, the Kiln Theatre commissioned Dedman to curate A Thousand Hands: Legacies and Futures of Care in Brent, which was exhibited at Brent Museum and Archives in her home borough in 2018.

Dedman remained in Lebanon until 2019, when she curated Shorthand: Nadim Karam, notes from the archive for A.MUSE.UM and collaborated with Carla Chammas on an exhibition titled At the still point of the turning world, there is the dance, displaying the works of Lebanese women artists of the 1960s and 1970s at the Sursock Museum in Beirut as part of Ashkal Alwan's Home Works 8: A Forum on Cultural Practices.

Dedman and Louise Bennett were on the State of Fashion's curatorial team at the 2024 Biennale.

== Personal life ==
Dedman is in a relationship with visual artist Andrew Maughan. They have a son (born 2022).

== Bibliography ==
=== Exhibition books ===
- At the Seams: A Political History of Palestinian Embroidery (2016)
- Labour of Love: New Approaches to Palestinian Embroidery (2018)
- Helen Khal: Gallery One and Beirut in the 1960s (2019), co-written with Carla Chammas
- Stitching the Intifada: Embroidery and Resistance in Palestine (2024)

=== Essays and chapters ===
- "The Politicisation of Palestinian Embroidery since 1948" in Dangerous Bodies: New Global Perspectives on Fashion and Transgression, edited by Royce Mahawatte and Jacki Willson
- in Narrative Threads: Palestinian Embroidery in Contemporary Art (2025), edited by Joanna Barakat
