= Laleh Khalili =

American academic

- Khalili at SOAS University of London in 2015

Academic background
- Education: University of Texas (BS); Columbia University (PhD)

Academic work
- Institutions: University of London

Laleh Khalili (Persian: لاله خلیلی) is an Iranian American Professor of Gulf Studies at University of Exeter.

She was formerly a Professor of Middle Eastern Politics at the School of Oriental and African Studies at the University of London and a Professor of International Politics at Queen Mary University of London.

== Life ==
Laleh Khalili received a BS in chemical engineering from the University of Texas in 1991, a master of international affairs from Columbia University in 1999, and a PhD in political science from Columbia University in 2004.

Her primary research areas are logistics and trade, infrastructure, policing and incarceration, gender, nationalism, political and social movements, refugees, and diasporas in the Middle East.

Her commentary on Middle Eastern and Iranian affairs has been used in several newspapers, including The Washington Post, the San Francisco Chronicle, the Chicago Tribune, the Financial Times, and Agence France-Presse. Khalili writes regularly for Iranian.com and The London Review of Books.

In 2007, Khalili signed an open letter in support of Haleh Esfandiari. She was part of the anti-racist coalition that reviewed an article by Kamel Daoud on violence against women in Cologne. The collective argued that Daoud used stereotypes and orientalist themes.

Khalili gave the Royal Geographical Society's 2024 Antipode lecture, entitled "Where is Palestine? Singapore on the Med, Spaceships, and the Mount of Olives".

== Bibliography ==
- Heroes and Martyrs of Palestine: The Politics of National Commemoration. Cambridge, UK; New York, 2007. ISBN 9780521106382, OCLC 494519376
- Time in the Shadows: Confinement in Counterinsurgencies. Stanford University Press, USA; Palo Alto, 2012. ISBN 9780804778336, OCLC 838555977
- Sinews of War and Trade: Shipping and Capitalism in the Arabian Peninsula. Verso Books, UK; London, 2020. ISBN 9781786634818
- The Corporeal Life of Seafaring. Mack Books, UK; London, 2024. ISBN 9781915743268
- Extractive Capitalism: How Commodities and Cronyism Drive the Global Economy. Profile Books, UK; London, 2025. ISBN 9781805223375

== Scholarly articles ==
- "Collective Property, Private Control" (review of Alexander C. Karp and Nicholas W. Zamiska, The Technological Republic: Hard Power, Soft Belief and the Future of the West, Bodley Head, February 2025, 295 pp.; and Raj M. Shah and Christopher Kirchhoff, Unit X: How the Pentagon and Silicon Valley Are Transforming the Future of War, Scribner, August 2024, 319 pp.), London Review of Books, vol. 47, no. 10 (5 June 2025), pp. 21–23. "The United States... has waged a war of some sort in every year of its existence. Silicon Valley knows that war is good for business. And many of its most powerful people want us to stop worrying about frivolities like ethics or ecology and love the bomb.... For the armchair techno-warriors of Silicon Valley, the barbarians at the gate are a useful solution." (p.23.)
- “'Fighting Over Drones'” (2012). Middle East Report 264 (Fall): pp. 18–22.
- "'Gendered Practices of Counterinsurgency'" (2011). Review of International Studies37(4): 1471–1491.
- “'The New (and Old) Classics of Counterinsurgency'” (2010) Middle East Report 255 (Summer): pp. 14–23.
- “'The Location of Palestine in Global Counterinsurgencies'” (2010). International Journal of Middle East Studies 42(3): pp. 413–433.
- “'On Torture'” (2008). Middle East Report 249 (Winter): pp. 32–38.
- "‘Standing with My Brother’: Hizbullah, Palestinians, and the Limits of Solidarity'" (2007). Comparative Studies in Society and History 49(2):276–303.
- "Places of Memory and Mourning: Palestinian Commemoration in the Refugee Camps of Lebanon". Comparative Studies of South Asia, Africa and the Middle East - Volume 25, Number 1, 2005, pp. 30–45
