= Joachim Koester =

Danish contemporary artist

Joachim Koester (born 1962) is a Danish contemporary artist who primarily works in installation, photography, and sound art. His work can be found in major metropolitan museums, including MoMA, the Metropolitan Museum of Art, Tate Modern, and the Centre Pompidou.

== Biography ==
Joachim Koester was born in Copenhagen, Denmark in 1962, and lives between Copenhagen and Brooklyn. He travels the world, using art as a tool to document lesser-known locations and draw attention to historical events. He combines elements of both reality and imagination to tell his stories. Art critic Hal Foster has characterized his work as being "along the borders between documentary and fiction."

== Education ==
Joachim Koester attended the Royal Danish Academy of Fine Arts from 1987 to 1993 where he earned his art degree. He is currently a professor of Fine Arts at Malmö Art Academy in Malmö, Sweden.

== Artworks ==
- Tarantism is a short film by Joachim Koester that aims to bring forgotten or suppressed events into collective memory. The film features Alexandra Bachzetsis, a choreographer, alongside six other performers. This film uses frantic dancing to explore the idea that shared histories can be rooted in our nervous and muscular systems and be awakened by erratic movements. Koester portrays these movements as a ritual performance by incorporating elements of post-modern dance.
- Day for Night, Christiania is a collection of 35 photos depicting Koester's attempt to document the transformation of Freetown Christiania. The photographs capture the values of mutual care and acceptance that were instilled in the community, which had previously served as a military base. Koester's focus lies on the disorder that remained as the people of Christiania were still in the early stages of establishing their settlement. At the time the photographs were taken, Christiania had only been established for 25 years. Koester Joachim and Catsou Roberts.
- From the Secret Garden of Sleep #6 is a portrait of a cannabis plant produced using a silver gelatin print. The work is one of six pieces from Koester's solo exhibition titled From the Secret Garden of Sleep. He utilizes his subjects to emphasize significant shifts in cultural perceptions by showcasing artworks that delve into topics like drug use and altered states. These photographs were presented in Mexico, a country heavily impacted by the War on Drugs.
- Maybe on must begin with some particular places. Barragan is a film directed by Joachim Koester, which examines the correlation between the intellect, physique, and essence through the utilization of Jerzy Grotowski's experimental theater performed by Jaime Soriano. The film takes place at the architect Luis Barragan's residence, constructing an imaginary encounter between these two prominent figures from Mexican cultural heritage.

== Exhibitions ==
=== Solo exhibitions ===
- 2021 -The Way Out is the Way In, Kunsthalle Mainz, Mainz, Germany
- 2020 - Photographic Works 1994-2019, Galleri Nicolai Wallner, Copenhagen, Denmark
- 2019 - Joachim Koester, SMK National Gallery of Denmark, Copenhagen, Denmark
- 2018 - Things That Shine And Things That Are Dark, Beirut Art Center, Beirut, Lebanon
- 2017 - In the Face of Overwhelming Forces, Camden Centre, London, UK
- 2016 - The Other Side of the Sky, Turner Contemporary, Margate, UK
- 2015 - Every muscular contraction contains the history of its origin, Galleri Nicolai Wallner, Copenhagen, Denmark
- 2014 - The Place of Dead Roads, Centre D'Art Contemporain Geneve, Geneva, Switzerland
- 2013 - Maybe One Must Begin with Some Particular Places, S.M.A.K. Ghent, Gent, Belgium
- 2012 - Some Boarded Up Houses, Galleri Nicolai Wallner, Copenhagen, Denmark
- 2011 - Variations of Incomplete Open Cubes, Jan Mot, Brussels, Brussels, Belgium
- 2010 - From the Secret Garden of Sleep, Museo Tamayo, Bosque De Chapultepec, Mexico City, Mexico

=== Group exhibitions ===
- 2023 - Sex, Drugs, Rock 'n Roll+ a New Video Work by Peter Land, Galleri Nicolai Wallner, Copenhagen, Denmark
- 2021 - Witches, TAXISPALAIS Kunsthalle Tirol, Innsbruck, Austria
- 2020 - The Botanical Mind: Art, Mysticism and The Cosmic Tree, Camden Art Centre, London, UK
- 2019 - touche! (gestures, movement, action), Beirut Art Center, Beirut, Lebanon
- 2018 - Superstition, Marres, Maastich, Holland
- 2017 - The Transported Man, Eli & Edythe Broad Art Museum At Michigan State
- 2016 - The Morality Reflex, Contemporary Art Centre, Vilnius
- 2015 - Another Part of the New World, Moscow Museum of Modern Art, Petrovka Street, Moscow, Russia
- 2014 - Our Inner Nature, Marabouparken, Sundbyberg, Sweden
- 2013 - A World of Wild Doubt, Kunstverein in Hamburg, Germany
- 2012 - A Blind Spot, Haus der Kulturen der Welt, Berlin, Germany
- 2011 - Fragmentations, Frac a Carquefou, Carquefou, France
- 2010 - It's a set-up, Kiasma, Museum of Contemporary Art Helsinki, Finland

== Collections ==
Joachim Koester's work can be found in prestigious collections such as the Centre Georges Pompidou in Paris, The Museum of Modern Art and the Metropolitan Museum of Art in New York, Moderna Museet in Stockholm, and Staten's Museum for Kunst in Copenhagen. His piece titled My Frontier Is an Endless Wall of Points can be found at the Museo Nacional Centro De Arte Reina Sofia. Koester's work titled Tarantism is also featured at the Tate Modern Museum in Bankside, London.

== Awards ==
Joachim Koester was awarded the 2013 Camera Austria Award for Contemporary Photography for his piece From the Secret Garden of Sleep #6 from 2008. With his exceptional skills in visual arts particularly in photography, Koester impressed the judges of the Camera Austria award by being able to seamlessly blending elements of reality and fiction. In 2008 Koester was a finalist for the Hugo Boss Prize, but ultimately lost to Emily Jacir.

== Publications ==
- Patterns Shimmers Scenes (2019)
- Bringing Something Back (2019)
- I Myself Am Only a Receiving Apparatus (2012)
- Joachim Koester of Spirits and Empty Spaces (2014)
- Row Housing (2002)
