= Dedman School of Hospitality =

College in Tallahassee, Florida

Dedman College of Hospitality
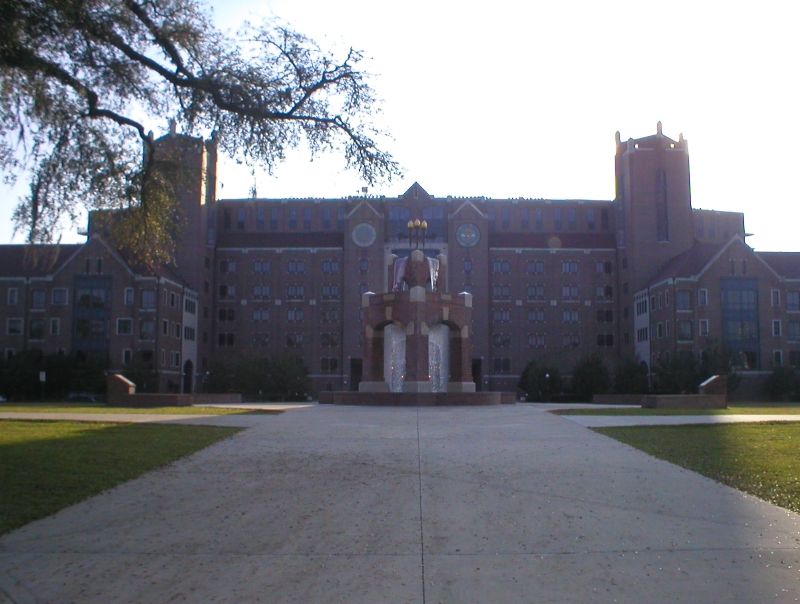
- Dedman College of Hospitality is located in University Center B at FSU's Doak Campbell Stadium.
- Type: Public
- Established: 1947
- Dean: Don Farr (Director)
- Location: Tallahassee, Florida, U.S. 30°26′14.1″N 84°18′12.1″W
- Website: www.dedman.fsu.edu

The Dedman College of Hospitality is located in Tallahassee, Florida at Florida State University. The College was founded in 1947 and offers majors in Hospitality Management & Tourism and Global Club Management & Leadership. They previously offered a degree in Professional Golf Management, but the major is no longer offered. The Dedman College was the first hospitality and tourism management program offered in the state of Florida.

The Dedman College of Hospitality is located at University Center B in the south endzone of Doak Campbell Stadium. Based on input from industry representatives, the hospitality management major includes a business component. The college has a high job placement record. The Dedman College of Hospitality also offers a major in Global Club Management & Leadership, for students interested in the industry of international and domestic private clubs and golf resorts. FSU has a history of graduating professional golfers and educating students for business and hospitality operations. As of 2021, the school is officially a College.
