= Claude Closky =

French artist

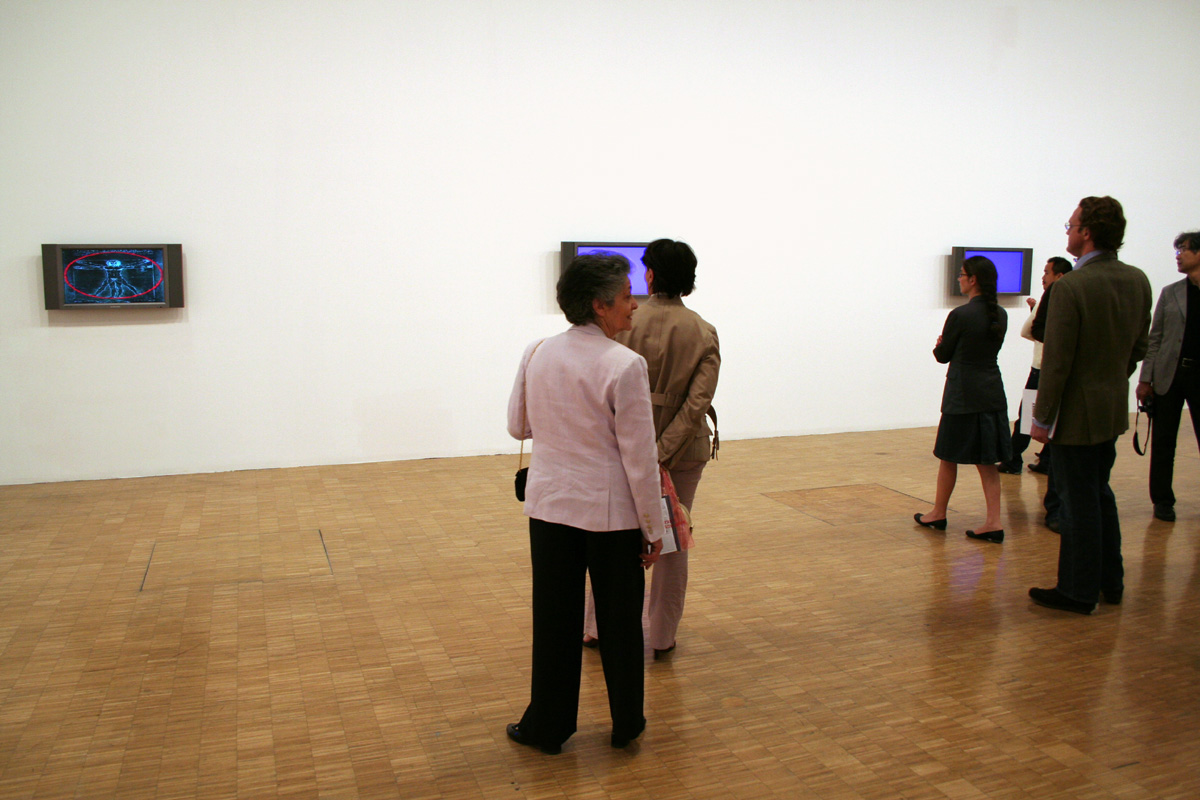
- Claude Closky, 'Manège [Roundabout]', 2006, sixteen 32" flat screens, sixteen pairs of stereo speakers, computer, dimensions variable, unlimited duration. Exhibition view 'Manège', Centre Pompidou, Paris. 16 May – 31 July 2006. Curated by Jean-Pierre Bordaz.
- Born: 22 May 1963 (age 61); Paris, France
- Notable work: Drawing, painting, new media
- Awards: Marcel Duchamp Prize (2005)
- Website: https://www.closky.info

Claude Closky (born 22 May 1963) is a French artist who lives and works in Paris.

== Reception ==
Closky won the "Grand prix des Arts plastiques" (1999) and the Marcel Duchamp Prize (2005) awarded by the ADIAF.

Dike Blair wrote in Artforum Magazine that "The lightness of Closky's art belies the depth of its absurdist heredity. Working in a post-modernist mode, Closky's art works combine aspects of the Situationists, Fluxus, Beckett, Daniel Buren, and Andy Warhol."

== Life and career ==
Claude Closky has no formal training as a visual artist. He entered the ENSAD (Ecole National Supérieure des Arts Décoratifs) in 1982, but quit at the end of the first year to co-found The Ripoulin Brothers, a street artist collective, with Bla+Bla+Bla, Nina Childress, Jean Faucheur, Pierre Huyghe, Manhu, Ox, Trois carrés. In 1988, he left the group to develop his independent work, using voluntarily poor means such as drawing and printed matter.

He has participated in the Biennials of Lyon (1995), Sydney (1996), Taipei (2000), València (2001), Sharjah (2005), Venice (2017), Mardin (2024). In 2000, the Mudam (Luxembourg Art Museum) commissioned him to conceive and manage its website, for which he made a magazine and a gallery dedicated to the internet. The site was launched at the Luxembourg Pavilion in the 2001, Venice Biennale. It presented specific works by Heath Bunting, François Curlet, Pierre Leguillon, Aleksandra Mir, Peter Kogler, David Shrigley, among others. Since 2005, he has taught at the École nationale supérieure des Beaux-Arts in Paris. In 2012, he curated This & There, an exhibition to celebrate the tenth year of the Pavilion, Palais de Tokyo Laboratory for Creation (Paris) which presented the work of 74 artists in 74 different spaces. He has curated in 2020 X at the Frac Pays de la Loire and in 2023 Offset at the Centre des livres d'artistes.

== Work ==
The work of Claude Closky is mainly immaterial. Language is his model to articulate images, text, numbers, and sounds collected in our environment, or made in his studio. Although Closky is reluctant to produce objects and spectacular effects, his work still addresses issues about visibility and space appropriation.

Claude Closky's projects always find alternative ways to emancipate themselves from the formats imposed by the sites where they are exhibited. He seeks to point out the contradictions of our contemporary society and its representations, but also to question the role of art as producer of a cultural consensus and set of values. His works confront and question our environment, the conditions and benefits of artistic production, its relation to an audience.

== Selected publications ==
Monographs
- ILUO, Saint-Yrieix-la-Perche: Centre des livres d'artistes, 2017
- Holly Crawford, Claude Closky Barking And Meowing, New York: AC Books, 2017
- Sihab Baik, Blackywall, Paris: RRose Editions, 2015
- Ali Akay, Claude Closky, Yazı mı Tura mı, Istanbul: Akbank Art Center, 2010
- Michel Gauthier, Claude Closky, 8002–9891, Vitry: Mac/Val, 2008
- Eduardo Cicelyn, Katy Siegel & Paul Mattick, Marie Muracciole, Climb at your own risk, Roma: Electa, 2007
- Jean-Pierre Bordaz, Marie Muracciole, François Piron, Katty Siegel & Paul Mattick, Claude Closky, Paris: Centre Georges Pompidou, 2006
- Carole Boulbès, Lynne Cooke, Alexandra Midal, Frédéric Paul, François Piron, David Platzker, Éric Troncy, Hello and Welcome, co-edition domaine Kergéhénec/Le Parvis, 2004
- Frédéric Paul, Claude Closky, Paris: Hazan, 1999
- Olivier Zahm, Claude Closky – Magazines, Paris: Purple Books, 1998
- Pascaline Cuvellier, Claude Closky – Le Parvis, Ibos: Le Parvis, 1996
Selection of artist's publications
- Conditions générales, 2023, Paris: Les petits matins ISBN 9782363833570
- Solutions, 2019, Pantin: CNEAI, 120 pages.
- Dictionary 2018, 2018, Paris: RRose Editions, 262 pages.
- Pick & Hammer, 2015, Brussels: mfc-michèle didier, 302 pages, 20,5 x 13,5 cm.
- Au fond de la piscine [The bottom of the pool], 2013, Montpellier: Esbama, 208 pages, 29,7 x 21 cm.
- Sept et pas sept [Seven and not seven], 2013, Brussels: JAP. Black and white offset print, 28 pages. Edition: 300.
- My People followed by Biennials, Marseille: Al Dante, 2009
- Repartir à zéro [starting from scratch], Marseille: (un)limited store
- Sex, Roma: Electa, 2007
- A meeting at home, Amsterdam: NEROC'VGM, 2005
- Les Euros, Paris: M19, 2003
- Mon père, Paris: M19, 2002
- Beautiful faces, Paris: Trans-photographic press, 2001
- Coloriage, Paris: onestar press, Paris, 2001
- Calendrier 2000, Paris: Centre Pompidou, 2000
- Mon Catalogue [my catalogue], 1999, Limoges: Frac Limousin
- A 1000 things to do, 1994–1996, Paris: Galerie du Jour agnès b.
- De A à Z, Paris: galerie Jennifer Flay, 1992
- The first thousand numbers classified in alphabetical order, self-published, 1989
