= Francis Alÿs =

Belgian painter (born 1959)

- Born: 22 August 1959 (age 67); Antwerp, Belgium
- Known for: Conceptual art; Performance art; Video art; Painting; Installation art
- Notable work: Paradox of Praxis 1; When Faith Moves Mountains; The Green Line; Tornado; The Silence of Ani; Children's Games
- Movement: Contemporary art; Social practice
- Awards: blueOrange Prize (2004); BACA-laureate prize (2010), EYE Art & Film Prize (2018); Rolf Schock Prizes (2020); Whitechapel Gallery Art Icon Award (2020); Wolfgang Hahn Prize (2023)

Francis Alÿs (born 22 August 1959, Antwerp) is a Belgian-born contemporary and multidisciplinary artist based in Mexico City. Alÿs explores themes including geopolitics, collective action, urban tensions, and everyday life in a variety of mediums ranging from paint to performance.

Cyclical repetition and mechanics of progression and regression also inform the character of Alÿs' actions and mythology — Alÿs contrasts geological and technological time through land-based and social practice that examine individual memory and collective mythology. Alÿs frequently uses rumor as a central tool in his practice, disseminating ephemeral, practice-based works through word-of-mouth and storytelling. He has documented children's games for decades.

== Work ==
Alÿs' body of works encompasses many media. Whereas in the earlier years the actions were mostly performed by the artist himself, over the past decade children have become the main protagonists of his projects. These public actions are documented in video, installations, paintings, and drawings. Alÿs focusses on anthropological and geopolitical concerns centred around observations of, and engagements with, everyday life, which he has described as "a sort of discursive argument composed of episodes, metaphors, or parables."

=== Actions ===
Many of his works involve observation and recording of the social, cultural and economic fabric of specific locations, commonly taking place during walks through urban areas. Citing the act of walking as the centre of his practice, for his first performance The Collector (1991), he dragged a small magnetic toy dog on wheels throughout the streets of Mexico City so as to collect any metallic residue lying in its path. In Fairy Tales (1995), he takes a walk after unravelling the sweater he has on, leaving an ever-lengthening, blue-thread trail in his wake. Also in 1995, Alÿs realized an action in São Paulo called The Leak in which he walked from a gallery, around the city, and back into the gallery trailing a dribbled line from an open can of blue paint. This action was reprised in 2004 when Alÿs traced a line of paint following the 1948 cease-fire border in Jerusalem, known as 'the green line', carrying a can filled with green paint. The bottom of the can was perforated with a small hole, so the paint dripped out as a continuous squiggly line on the ground as he walked. The work Paradox of Praxis 1 (Sometimes Making Something Leads to Nothing) documents an action performed on the streets of Mexico City in 1997. The film depicts a simple and seemingly pointless endeavour, where a large block of ice is pushed through the city streets for nine hours until it melts away to a puddle of meltwater. Rachel Spence sees Alÿs in this action as "an artist who marries surreal whimsy with ethical commitment". The artist describes the work as a settling of accounts with minimalist sculpture. In his critique of this art form, Alÿs also chooses a simple formal language – the block of ice is a cuboid. In Paradox of Praxis 1 he addresses a spatial structure, although he does not relocate it to a gallery or to a stable public space, but to a public space that is altered and expanded until the end of the sculpture’s performance is reached. Through the act of pushing, the minimalist cuboid gradually loses its form. Not only is the ‘gallery’ in flux, the object itself is transformed. It dissolves into the urban space, which thereby becomes an element of the artistic process. The smaller the block of ice becomes, the more the space comes to the fore. Ultimately, the urban space takes the place of the sculpture, becoming the actual subject of the artwork.

The Rehearsal (1999) consists of a 30 min static take of a red VW Beetle driving up the slope of a dirt road in a shantytown of Tijuana while the viewer hears musicians rehearsing a song. Every time they stop playing, the car rolls backwards down the hill, as if running out of petrol, but when the music starts up again, the car starts driving up the hill once more.

In Tornado (2000-2010), spliced film clips show Alÿs chasing after huge dust devils kicked up by the annual dry season in Milpa Alta, a region near Mexico City that is particularly prone to them. Kara L. Rooney writes of the piece in The Brooklyn Rail, "The sight of his lean frame racing towards the twisters is at once ridiculous and hysterical—blithe qualities that quickly give way to gravitas as the artist physically enters the eye of the storm. Inside, chaos reigns and Alÿs, unprotected except for his handheld camera, is enveloped and pummeled by flying bits of sand, dust and dirt."

In his best-known work, When Faith Moves Mountains (2002), Alÿs recruited 500 volunteers (mostly university students) in Ventanilla District outside of Lima, Peru to move a sand dune 500 meters in diameter, 10 centimetres. Frieze, who named the work No.19 of "The 25 Best Works of the 21st Century", said that the work was "A distillation of Latin America’s long history of colonial conquest, migration and urban development, the ephemeral work is also a parable for the necessary labour – and belief – required to realize social transformation." Art critic Jean Fisher writes that "the radical event of art precipitates a crisis of meaning or, rather, it exposes the void of meaning at the core of a given social situation, which is its truth."

Between 2004 and 2005 Alÿs collaborated with Artangel on several projects regrouped under the title of Seven Walks. In one of them, The Nightwatch (2004), a wild fox called Bandit was set free in the National Portrait Gallery while its wanderings were filmed by the surveillance cameras of the museum.

For Performa 05, Alys created Ensayo II (2005) in collaboration with Rafael Ortega. The performance juxtaposed high and low in a staged performance featuring a striptease artist (Bella Yao), a classical pianist (Alexander Rovang), and a soprano (Viktoria Kurbatskaya).

In the project Don't Cross the Bridge Before You Get to the River (2008), a line of children with shoe boats leaves Europe towards Morocco while a line of kids with shoe boats leaves Africa towards Spain, with the lines eventually meeting on the horizon. As in many of Alÿs' video projects, his collaborators were Rafael Ortega, Julien Devaux, Felix Blume and Ivan Boccara.

For Manifesta 10 in St. Petersburg, Alÿs contributed with Lada Kopeika Project (2014), a "road trip" that concludes with the Lada car crashing into a tree in the courtyard of the Hermitage. The Silence of Ani was realized in 2015 with a group of teenagers from Kars, Turkey. It takes place on the present Turkish-Armenian border in the once Armenian City of Ani which, after centuries of successive invasions and sackings, lies today in a state of total abandon and decay. Alÿs gave instruments to imitate birdcalls to the teenagers; they entered the city walls and, hiding in the rubble, called the birds to create the illusion that the city was coming back to life.

=== Painting ===
"I was profoundly under the spell of pre-Renaissance painting during my years of university in Italy: from Lorenzetti to Fra Angelico. Even to this day, my iconography is a combination of that imagery and the language of Mexican sign painting. This blend allowed me to find a personal way of materializing images. I've never been that interested in a painterly style. My images are most often mentally resolved— 'imagined'—by the time they make it to the canvas."

In the early nineties, Alÿs collaborated with Mexican sign-painters ("rotulistas") to paint enlarged and elaborated versions of his small paintings, which they were invited to reproduce at their own taste. The generic name of this project was The Liar, the Copy of the Liar (1997). His intention is to challenge the idea of the original artwork, rendering the process of making more anonymous and deflating the perceived commercial value of art.

The paintings of the series Le temps du sommeil were begun in 1996 and often worked on at night. They feature dreamlike scenes involving tiny suited men and women acting out strange rituals reminiscent of children's games and gymnastic experiments. Many of these images anticipate and recall the forms he has employed in his actions, but the paintings connect to his actions in other ways too since their surfaces are worked and re-worked. The fact that the images are never final but rather are palimpsests, suggests the deep connection between figurative painting and action art that lies at the heart of Alÿs' work.

"What justifies my recourse to painting is that it's the shortest way — or sometimes the only way — to translate certain scenarios or situations that cannot be said, that cannot be filmed or performed. It's about entering a situation that could not exist elsewhere, only on the paper or canvas. [...] Also, painting allows me to retreat from the sometimes hectic rhythm of the performances and film productions, and to distance myself without losing contact with them. [...] When I am translating an ongoing film plot into an image, I'll try to create an image that reflects the intention behind the plot rather than illustrating the facts of the film. It functions more like a correspondence, a pendant."

=== The Fabiola Project ===
Since 1994, Alÿs has been collecting copies of Jean-Jacques Henner's painting of Fabiola, a fourth-century patrician Roman woman who, despite divorce and remarriage, did such fervent penance that she was welcomed back to the faith and, after her death, sainted. Through a novel written by Cardinal Wiseman, Fabiola regained popularity in the middle of the nineteen century. Alÿs acquired copies of Fabiola portraits painted by amateurs in flea markets and antiques stores, in places as various as Mexico, Chile, Brazil, Holland, Germany, Lebanon and Russia. The paintings have been left in their original state. The artists, dates, and places of origin are often unknown.

Alÿs explained his interest in these pictures: 'It made me question the status of an icon. What is an icon? Is an icon defined by official art history? Or is an icon defined by, in this case, what seems to be an amateur painter's obsession with a particular image?'

=== Recent projects ===
Between 2010 and 2014, Alÿs traveled extensively to Afghanistan following his invitation to participate in dOCUMENTA(13). In collaboration with Julien Devaux and Ajmal Maiwandi, he produced Reel-Unreel (2011), a 20 min film. The camera follows two young Afghan boys as they chase the reel rolling down the hills of Kabul, with one boy unrolling the strip of film and leading the way, while another follows him, rewinding it. The title Reel-Unreel alludes to the real/unreal image of Afghanistan conveyed by the media in the West: how the Afghan way of life, along with its people, has gradually been dehumanized and, after decades of war, turned into a Western fiction. In 2013, he was an embedded war artist with the UK's Task Force in the province of Helmand (Adrenalotourism, 2013).

Originally invited by the Baghdad-based Ruya Foundation to do a project in Yezidi refugee camps, Alÿs' main focus of production from 2015 to 2020 took place in Iraq. As a war artist again he accompanied a Peshmerga battalion during the Kurdish offensive to free Mosul from the Islamic state of occupation. In that region Alÿs has also developed projects such as Hopscotch (2016), produced in collaboration with the Yazidi Refugee Camp of Sharya, Duhok, Iraq; Color Matching (2016), filmed during his embed with Kurdish forces; Salam Tristesse (2018) produced in collaboration with the Yazidi Refugee Camp of Kabarto and lastly Sandlines, the Story of History (2020), a feature film where the children of a mountain village near Mosul reenact a century of Iraqi history, from the secret agreement of Sykes/Picot signed in 1916 to the realm of terror established by the Islamic State in 2016. Sandlines premiered in 2020 at festivals like Sundance, the International Film Festival Rotterdam, and Mexico City's FICUNAM.

Alÿs continues to add to his long-running film series Children's Games (1999–present) which has amassed some 50 videos of children playing games in places in Afghanistan, Iraq, Mexico, Europe, and Hong Kong. The series reflects the artist's habit of 'making contact' with a different culture by seeing and filming how children play.

== Exhibitions ==
=== Exhibitions (selection) ===
Solo Exhibitions
Year	Title	Institution	Location	Ref.
1999		Venice Biennale	Venice	
2001		Venice Biennale	Venice	
2004		Carnegie International		
2006		Portikus	Frankfurt	
2006		Hirshhorn Museum and Sculpture Garden	Washington DC	
2007		Hammer Museum	Los Angeles	
2007		Venice Biennale	Venice	
2008		Irish Museum of Modern Art	Dublin	
2010		The Renaissance Society, University of Chicago		
2010-11	A Story of Deception	Tate Modern	London	
2015-17	A Story of Negotiation	Museo Tamayo Arte Contemporáneo	Mexico City	
2015-17	A Story of Negotiation	Museo de Arte Latinoamericano de Buenos Aires (MALBA)	Fundación Costantini, Buenos Aires	
2015-17	A Story of Negotiation	Museo Nacional de Bellas Artes de la Habana	Havana	
2015-17	A Story of Negotiation	Art Gallery of Ontario	Toronto	
2013		Museum of Contemporary Art	Tokyo	
2013		Hiroshima City Museum of Contemporary Art		
2017		Venice Biennale	Venice	
2018		Manif d’art, Québec City Biennale	Québec	
2018		Rockbund Art Museum (RAM)	Shanghai	
2018		Art Sonje Center	Seoul	
2019-20	Children’s Games	Eye Filmmuseum	Amsterdam	
2020		Museo Nacional de Colombia	Bogotá	
2021		Musée cantonal des Beaux-Arts	Lausanne	
2022	Francis Alÿs: The Nature of the Game	Belgian Pavilion, 59th Venice Biennale	Venice	
2022		Copenhagen Contemporary	Copenhagen	
2022		Kuandu Museum of Fine Arts	Taipei	
2023		Museo Universitario Arte Contemporáneo (MUAC)	Mexico City	
2023-24		Wiels Centre d'Art Contemporain	Brussels	
2024		Museo de Arte de Zapopan	Zapopan, Mexico	
		Museo de Arte de Lima (MALI)		
		Barbican Art Gallery	London	
2024-25		Museu de Serralves	Porto	
2025		Museo Ludwig	Cologne	
?		The Museum of Modern Art	New York	
?		MoMA PS1	New York	

== Awards and recognition ==
- 2004: Blue Orange prize
- 2008: Vincent Award
- 2010: BACA-laureate prize
- 2018: EYE Art & Film Prize, EYE Filmmuseum
- 2020: Whitechapel Gallery Art Icon Award
- 2020: Rolf Schock Prize in Visual Arts
- 2023: Wolfgang Hahn Prize, Museum Ludwig
- 2023: Rolf Schock Prize in Visual Arts

Alÿs was among the names in Blake Gopnik's 2011 list "The 10 Most Important Artists of Today", with Gopnik arguing that his art stands for "being alive and striving to do anything in a universe that grinds all efforts to dust."

In 2013, Dale Eisinger of Complex ranked Re-Enactment 10th in his list of the greatest performance art works, saying that it "seems to carry more personal risk as well heavier social critique [sic]" than the better-known When Faith Moves Mountains.

== Selected bibliography ==
- 2004. Francis Alÿs: The Modern Procession. Texts by Francis Alÿs, Lynne Cooke, Alejandro Diaz, Tom Eccles, Dario Gamboni, RoseLee Goldberg, Laurence Kardish, Harper Montgomery, and Francesco Pellizzi. Interview with the artist by Tom Eccles and Robert Storr. Public Art Fund, New York.
- 2005. When Faith Moves Mountains/Cuando la fe mueve montañas. Texts by Susan Buck Morss, Gustavo Buntinx, Lynne Cooke, Corinne Diserens, Cuauhtémoc Medina, and Gerardo Mosquera. Turner, Madrid.
- 2006. Francis Alÿs: The Historic Centre of Mexico City. Text by Carlos Monsiváis. Turner, Madrid.
- 2006. Diez cuadras alrededor del estudio, Antiguo Colegio de San Ildefonso, Mexico City.
- 2006. Francis Alÿs: A Story of Deception - Patagonien 2003-2006. Texts by Francis Alÿs and Olivier Debroise. Revolver, Frankfurt (exh. cat.).
- 2007. Francis Alÿs: Politics of Rehearsal. Text by Russell Ferguson. Steidl, Göttingen, Germany and Hammer Museum, Los Angeles (exh. cat.).
- 2010. In A Given Situation/Numa Dada Situação. Texts by Ton Marar, Cuauhtémoc Medina, and Alfonso Reyes. Cosac Naify, São Paulo.
- 2010. Francis Alÿs: A Story of Deception. Edited by Mark Godfrey, Klaus Biesenbach, and Kerryn Greenberg. Texts by Eduardo Abaroa, Francesco Careri, T.J. Demos, Carla Faesler, Laymert Garcia dos Santos, Mark Godfrey, Boris Groys, Miwon Kwon, Tom McDonough, Lorna Scott Fox, Eyal Weizman, et al. Tate Publishing, London (exh. cat.).
- 2011. Sign Painting Project. Edited by Theodora Vischer. Texts by Francis Alÿs, Néstor García Canclini, Monika Kästli, and Cuauhtémoc Medina. Steidl, Göttingen, Germany and Schaulager, Basel.
- 2013. Francis Alÿs: schilder van luchtspiegelingen. Text by Paul de Moor. Ludion, Antwerp.
- 2013. Don't Cross the Bridge Before You Get to the River. Texts by Yukie Kamiya and Kazuhiko Yoshizaki. Seigensha Art Publishing, Kyoto (exh. cat.).
- 2014. Francis Alÿs: REEL-UNREEL. Edited by Andrea Viliani. Texts by Francis Alÿs, Carolyn Christov-Bakargiev, Mario García Torres, Mariam Ghani, Ewa Gorządek, Ajmal Maiwandi, Amanullah Mojadidi, Robert Slifkin, and Michael Taussig. Interview with the artist by Ajmal Maiwandi and Andrea Viliani. Museo d'Arte Contemporanea Donnaregina Napoli (MADRE), Naples and Centre for Contemporary Art Ujazdowski Castle, Warsaw (exhibition catalogue).
- 2015. Relato de una negociación: pintura y acción en la obra de Francis Alÿs/A Story of Negotiation: Painting and Action in the Work of Francis Alÿs, Museo Tamayo Arte Contemporáneo, Mexico City (exhibition catalogue).
- 2016. Le temps du sommeil. Texts by Francis Alÿs and Catherine Lampert. Secession, Vienna.
- 2018. Knots'n Dust: Francis Alÿs. Text by Marie Muracciole. Les Presses du réel, Dijon.
- 2019. Francis Alÿs: La dépense, Rockbund Art Museum, Shanghai (exhibition catalogue).
- 2019. Francis Alÿs: Children’s Games. Texts by Cuauhtémoc Medina, David MacDougall, Lorna Scott Fox. Eye Filmmuseum, Amsterdam.
- 2020. Francis Alÿs: Salam Tristess, Irak, 2016-2020. In collaboration with Fundación Ruya, Taiyana Pimental, Cuauhtémoc Medina, Museo Nacional de Colombia, Bogota.
- 2021. Francis Alÿs: As Long as I am walking. Texts by Nicole Schweizer, Julia Bryan-Wilson, Luis Pérez-Oramas, Judith Rodenbeck, Musée Cantonal des Beaux-Arts, Lausanne.
- 2022. Francis Alÿs: The Nature of the Game. Belgian Pavilion 59th Venice Biennale (exhibition catalogue).
- 2023. Francis Alÿs: Children’s Games 1999-2022. Texts by Cuauhtémoc Medina and Luis Perez Orama. MUAC, Museo Universitario de Arte Contemporaneo, UNAM. (exhibition catalogue).
- 2022 (and 2007). Francis Alÿs. Texts by Russell Ferguson, Cuauhtémoc Medina, Jean Fisher, Michael Taussig. Phaidon, London and New York.
- 2024. Francis Alÿs: Ricochets. Essays by Helena Chávez Mac Gregor, Carla Faesler, Cuauhtémoc Medina, Florence Ostende and Inês Geraldes Cardoso. Barbican, Serralves, Prestel, Munich, London and New York. (exhibitions catalogue).
