= Guy de Cointet =

- Guy de Cointet in 1980
- Born: 1934; Paris, France
- Died: 1983 (aged 48–49); Los Angeles, California, U.S.
- Website: guydecointet.org

Guy de Cointet (1934–1983) was a French-born artist based in California who created text and sculptural works, often combining them as props and stage sets in theatrical performance pieces.

== Biography ==
Guy de Cointet was born in Paris in 1934, the son of a military officer. He attended high school with Yves Saint Laurent and the fashion photographer Jérôme Ducrot, both of whom shared and influenced de Cointet's interest in fashion. After unsuccessfully competing in a 1952 clothing design competition sponsored by the Chambre Syndicale de la Haute Couture, de Cointet attended the École des Beaux-Arts de Nancy. In 1956 he moved to Paris, where he worked as an illustrator for the magazines Vogue and Jardin des Mondes.

de Cointet moved to New York in 1965, following brief stays in the Canary Islands and in central France near Limoges. Shortly after arriving in New York, de Cointet was introduced to the sculptor Larry Bell by their mutual friend Susan Hoffman. Bell hired de Cointet as an assistant, working first at Bell's studio in New York. He later followed Bell to Venice Beach, California, where de Cointet would reside until his death in 1983. Between 1975 and 1977 he taught at the Otis Art Institute in Los Angeles, giving courses focusing on performance art.

== Artwork ==
Guy de Cointet's text works on canvas and on paper were based on systems of encoding or abstracting text, such as by mirror writing. These pieces used found text from popular culture, everyday conversation or literary sources, often creating a humorous, droll, ironic, or melancholic effect. He produced several encrypted publications, including a completely encrypted newspaper titled ACRCIT. Silkscreen printed by Pierre Picot, a French artist teaching at CalArts, ACRCIT was distributed for free through newspaper boxes across Los Angeles.

His performance pieces combined literary puzzle or codes and the tropes of TV soap opera, drawing inspiration from the works of Raymond Roussel. The pieces were performed by actors such as Factory 'superstar' Viva and diminutive comedian Billy Barty. Theater critic Frantisek Deak once wrote of Cointet's structuralist approach that the artist juxtaposed "lifelike casual conversation with contrived literary language ... [pointing] out that both are particular styles and that, with a certain distance, the casual conversation will appear contrived as well." Deak was specifically referring to plays such as Tell Me (1979), in which fashionably attired actresses variously describe a white cardboard square featuring the black capital letters A, D, M, and T.

His work has influenced that of Paul McCarthy, Mike Kelley, and Catherine Sullivan, among others.

== Selected works ==
=== Performances ===
- Lost at Sea (1975)
- Five Sisters (1982)
- Ethiopia (1976)
- Iglu, Ramona, Cigar, (1977)
- Tell Me (1979)
- The Bridegroom (his last work, never performed in his lifetime)

Ethiopia, Iglu, Cigar, and Ramona were collaborations with the artist Robert Wilhite. Five Sisters was a collaboration with artist Eric Orr.

=== Books and publications ===
- A Captain from Portugal (1972)
- A Few Drawings by Guy de Cointet (1975)
- ACRCIT (newspaper, 1975)

== Selected exhibitions ==
- Who's That Guy?, MAMCO, Geneva, 2004
- Making Words With Things, CRAC, Séte, 2006
- Guy de Cointet, Le Quartier, Quimper, curated by Frédéric Paul, 2011
