= Joreige =

Joreige is a surname. Notable people with the surname include:

- Khalil Joreige (born 1969), Lebanese filmmaker and artist
- Lamia Joreige (born 1972), Lebanese visual artist and filmmaker
