= Samia Halaby =

Palestinian-American artist (born 1936)

Samia A. Halaby
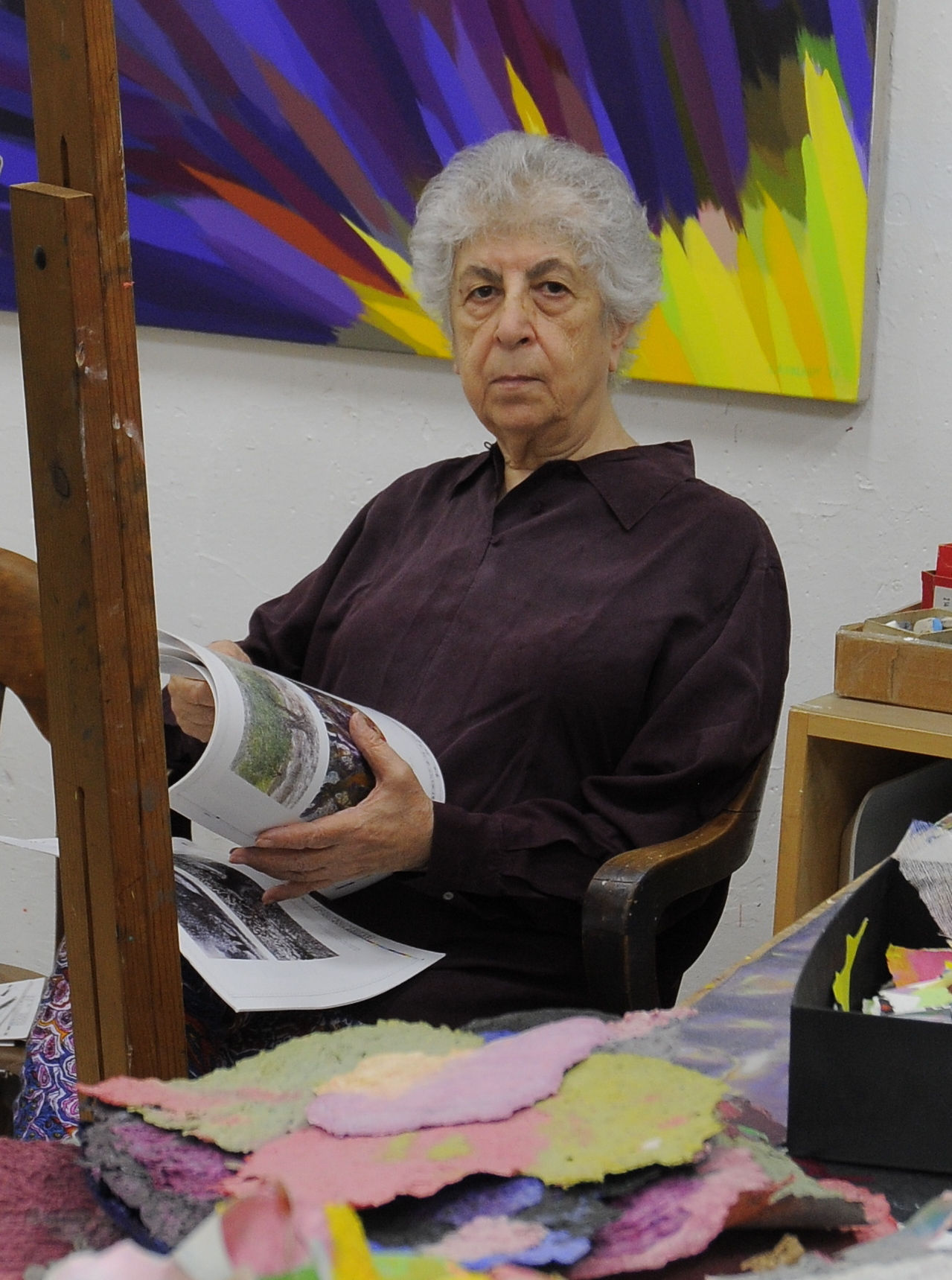
- Halaby in 2013
- Born: December 12, 1936 (age 89); Jerusalem, Mandatory Palestine
- Occupations: Visual artist, activist, educator and scholar
- Known for: Painting, digital art, art history
- Notable work: Growing Shapes: Aesthetic Insights of an Abstract Painter (Palestine Books, Inc. in collaboration with Ayyam Gallery); Liberation Art of Palestine: Palestinian Painting and Sculpture in the Second Half of the 20th Century (H.T.T.B. Publications)

Samia A. Halaby (born 1936) is a Palestinian-American visual artist, activist, educator, and scholar. Halaby is recognized as a pioneer of abstract painting and Computer art. Since beginning her artistic career in the late 1950s, she has exhibited in museums, galleries, and art fairs throughout Europe, Asia, and North America. Her work is housed in public and private collections around the world, including the Solomon R. Guggenheim Museum (New York), the Institut du Monde Arabe (Paris), and the Palestinian Museum (Birzeit). Her work was included in the 2024 Venice Biennale. She is represented by Andrée Sfeir-Semler's gallery, operating in Beirut and Hamburg.

== Early life ==
Halaby was born in Jerusalem on December 12, 1936, during the British Mandate of Palestine. She is the daughter of Asaad Halaby and Foutonie Atallah Halaby. Samia has two older brothers, Dr. Sami and Dr. Fouad Halaby, and a younger sister, Dr. Nahida Halaby. Their father was orphaned and, at a young age, had the financial responsibility of supporting his siblings thrust upon him. He began the first taxi service in Jerusalem in the early 1900s, eventually becoming a principal of Lind & Halaby Ltd., a seller of the Goodyear Tire and Rubber Company. Their mother was educated at the Friends School in Ramallah. She was referred to as "the encyclopedia of the family".

Halaby attended the British Tabitha Mission School. Halaby retains vivid visual memories of her life in Palestine, especially of the trees and leaves in her grandmother Maryam Atallah's garden in Jerusalem. As a young child Samia would experience synesthetic colors and shapes that would correlate with various family members. Her sister was a rounded and yellow/white iridescent; Samia was a dark metallic red sideways railroad. In 1948, Halaby and her family fled their home in the port city of Yafa during the Nakba. She was 11 years old. Her family fled to Lebanon, residing in Beirut until 1951, before eventually settled in Cincinnati, Ohio. Halaby graduated from North College Hill High School.

== Career ==
Halaby received her academic training in the Midwestern United States (BSc Design – University of Cincinnati; MA Painting – Michigan State University; MFA – Indiana University). She was active in American academia and taught art at the university level for over twenty years, a decade of which was spent as an associate professor at the Yale School of Art (1972–1982), where she was the first woman to hold the position of associate professor. She also taught at the University of Hawaii, Indiana University, the Cooper Union, the University of Michigan, and the Kansas City Art Institute.

Based in New York City since 1976, Halaby has long been active in the city's art scene, mainly through independent and non-profit art spaces and artist-run initiatives. In addition, she has participated in leftist political organizing for various causes. She has long been an activist and in 2019 endowed the Samia A. Halaby Foundation to support Palestinian women and children.

=== Scholarship on Palestinian art ===
As an independent scholar she has contributed to the documentation of Palestinian art of the twentieth century through many texts including her 2001 book Liberation Art of Palestine: Palestinian Painting and Sculpture in the Second Half of the 20th Century (H.T.T.B. Publications), and a chapter titled "The Pictorial Arts of Jerusalem During the First Half of the 20th Century" that appears in the 2012 book Jerusalem Interrupted: Modernity and Colonial Transformation 1917-Present (ed. Lena Jayyusi, Olive Branch Press), and through several curated exhibitions of Palestinian art in the US. She has also lectured widely on the subject in galleries and universities throughout the United States and in venues in the Arab world.

She was instrumental in the 2003 landmark exhibition Made in Palestine, which was organized by the Station Museum of Contemporary Art in Houston and curated by James Harithas, Tex Kerschen, and Gabriel Delgado. Halaby actively assisted the curators in researching Palestinian artists, both in the United States and the Arab world, introducing them to such artists as the late Mustapha Hallaj in Syria and Abdul Hay al Mussalam in Jordan, for example. The first museum exhibition of Palestinian art to be held in the US, Made in Palestine went on to tour throughout the country.

The 2004 exhibition The Subject of Palestine, which Halaby curated for the DePaul Art Museum, was described by the Chicago Tribune as presenting "the work of 16 contemporary Palestinian artists that even the least informed of viewers are likely to come away with the sense that they have seen and grasped something important." The review went on to congratulate DePaul Art Museum for its "incisive presentation".

=== Cancelled 2024 retrospective ===
Halaby's first retrospective exhibition in the United States, titled Centers of Energy and curated by Elliot Josephine Leila Reichert, was scheduled to open in 2024 at Indiana University Bloomington’s Eskenazi Museum of Art, but the show was cancelled in December 2023. The University cited "safety concerns" as the reason for cancelling her show. Halaby believed the reason for the cancellation of her show was to suppress Palestinian voices during the Gaza war, saying the cancellation was "an extension of what's happening in Gaza, where Palestinians are not allowed to speak or express our opinion." In October 2024, Michigan State University removed Six Golden Heroes, a painting referring to the escape of Palestinian political prisoners.

Halaby was awarded the 2025 Munch Award for Artistic Freedom in September 2025.

== Painting style ==
Halaby primarily works in abstraction but has also utilized a documentary-style of figurative drawing in more politically oriented works, such as her Kafr Qasm series. She has designed dozens of political posters and banners for various anti-war causes, and is featured in the publication The Design of Dissent. The development of her work over the past fifty years has been closely related to locating the many principles of abstraction in nature utilizing a materialist approach. A number of her paintings have been created by building upon the methods and forms of certain historical applications of abstraction, such as that of the Russian Constructivists, and examples of traditional Arabic arts and Islamic architecture. The visual culture of Palestine and its natural setting have also figured into her paintings, as has the dynamism of New York City as experienced in the sights of people in motion and its busy streets

Her approach to abstraction has ranged from works exploring the visual properties of the geometric still life to free-form paintings in the form of collaged pieces of canvas that are joined to create larger abstractions that she calls "free from the stretcher". Halaby describes these pieces as previously painted fragments that are cut, stitched and reformed into hanging sculptures with paint applied to both sides. As of 2020, her oeuvre contained more than 3,000 works, including paintings, digital media, three-dimensional hanging sculptures, artist books, drawings, and limited edition artist prints. Her Helixes and Cycloid series, as well as her Diagonal Flight series, are examples of her perceptual theory.

After retiring from teaching, Halaby began experimenting with electronic art forms, teaching herself how to program Basic and C programming languages on an Amiga computer and later on a PC. Creating programs that would allow viewers to witness the process of live computerized painting, she enlisted the help of musicians for kinetic art performances that were inspired by jam sessions. Her "Kinetic Painting Group" toured extensively in the late 1990s, and video works continue to be shown across the world.

=== Abstract color (1963–1965) ===
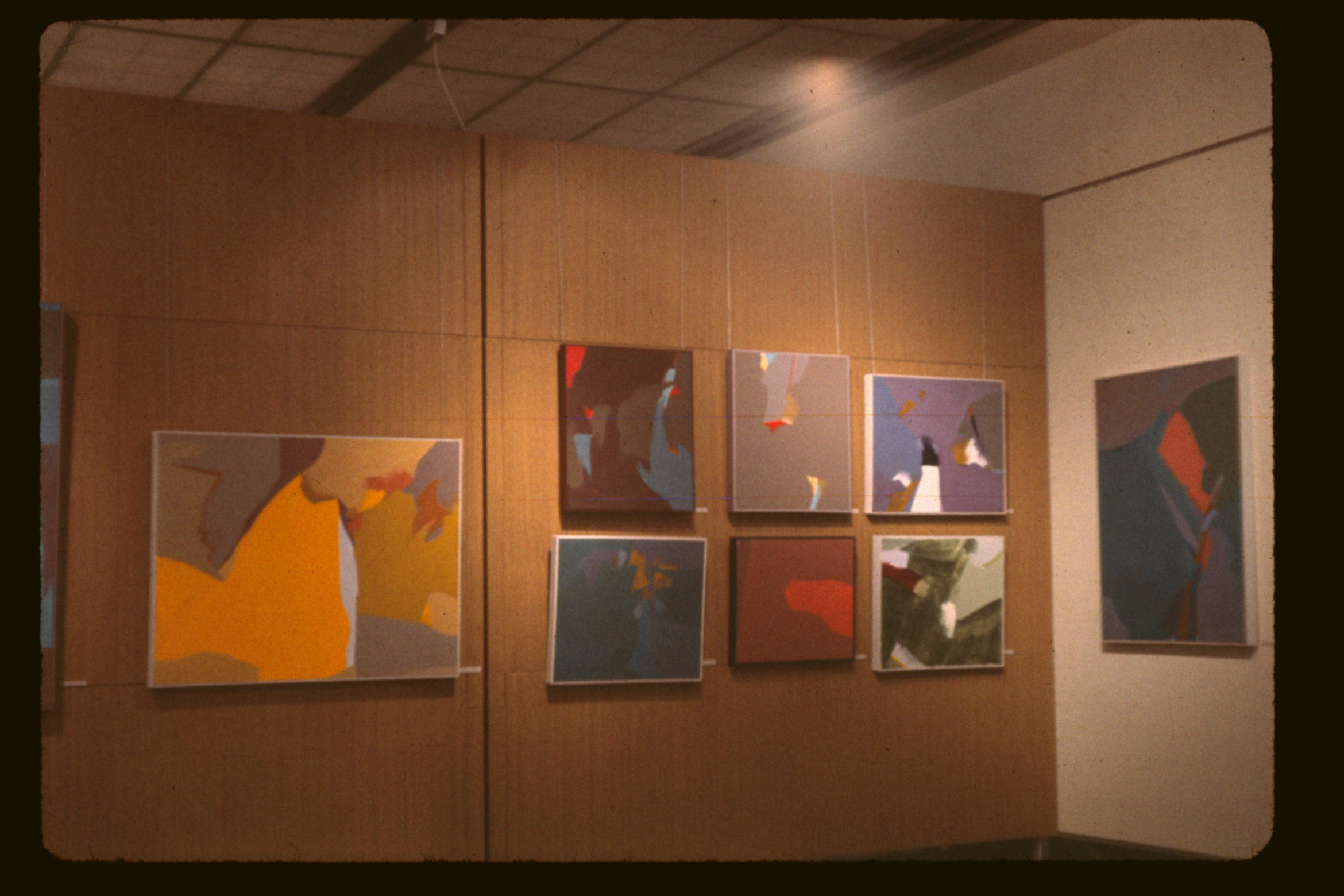
Indiana University graduate show, 1963

During her final student days and for a period after, Halaby's approach to painting was characterized by flat color; in these works, relationships of luminosity and simultaneous contrast were inspired by the minimalists and by the work of Josef Albers and his book Interaction of Color. In terms of shape, the work depended essentially on the rectangular surfaces of human life, be they walls, windows, writing paper, floors, cards, or gently hung weavings. The variety of scale and placement was clearly an abstraction from ways of examining the world we see. During that short span, Halaby left Bloomington to teach in Honolulu at the University of Hawaii, then moved to Kansas City to teach at the Kansas City Art Institute, her second teaching position.

=== Geometric still-life (1966–1970) ===
After 1965, a scientific attitude of exactly how we observe and interpret what we see overtook her. She has written, "I began to feel that I must make a clean, new beginning and erase my teachers and my past out of my thoughts." At this point, Halaby relied on what she saw at museums and her knowledge of art history to develop her new way of thinking. She examined Rembrandt and his use of light and color in portraiture, and was particularly impressed with the Old Master collection at the Kansas City Museum. After an extended and frustrating exploration, a small orange on a windowsill captured Halaby's attention and started the new series. This inspiration can be attributed to the painting Virgin and Child in Domestic Interior (c. 1467–69) by Flemish master Petrus Christus in the collection of the Nelson-Atkins Gallery of Art in Kansas City. Halaby was then teaching at the Kansas City Art Institute and leading a boldly experimental program for first-year students.

As she describes her interest in later writing, Halaby tells of revisiting the museum to examine how artists historically treated edges. From her thorough education at the University of Cincinnati, Halaby understood the failures of perspective. She wanted to know exactly what it is we see when our eye travels over the surface of a spherical or cylindrical object, reaches the edge and then jumps to a far background. Finding no answers, Halaby realized that how we see is educated. Over millennia, artists have contributed the multitude of small discoveries that created the monument of visual culture that teaches us how to see—what Halaby calls "visual conjugation." This then became, to Halaby, the important challenge as she insisted that painting is exploration not performance.

=== Helixes and Cycloids (1971–1975) ===
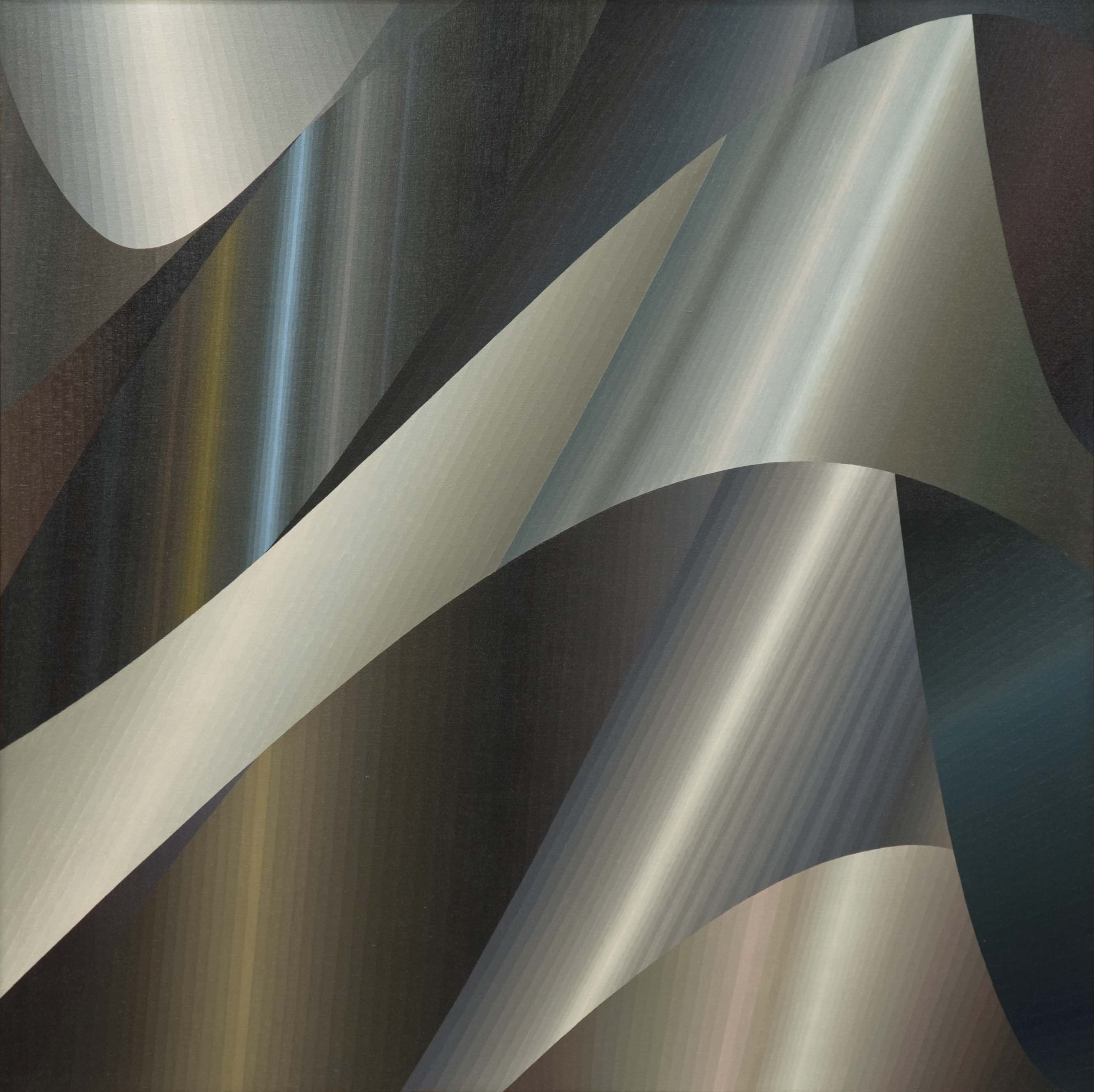
Slicer Waves, 1973

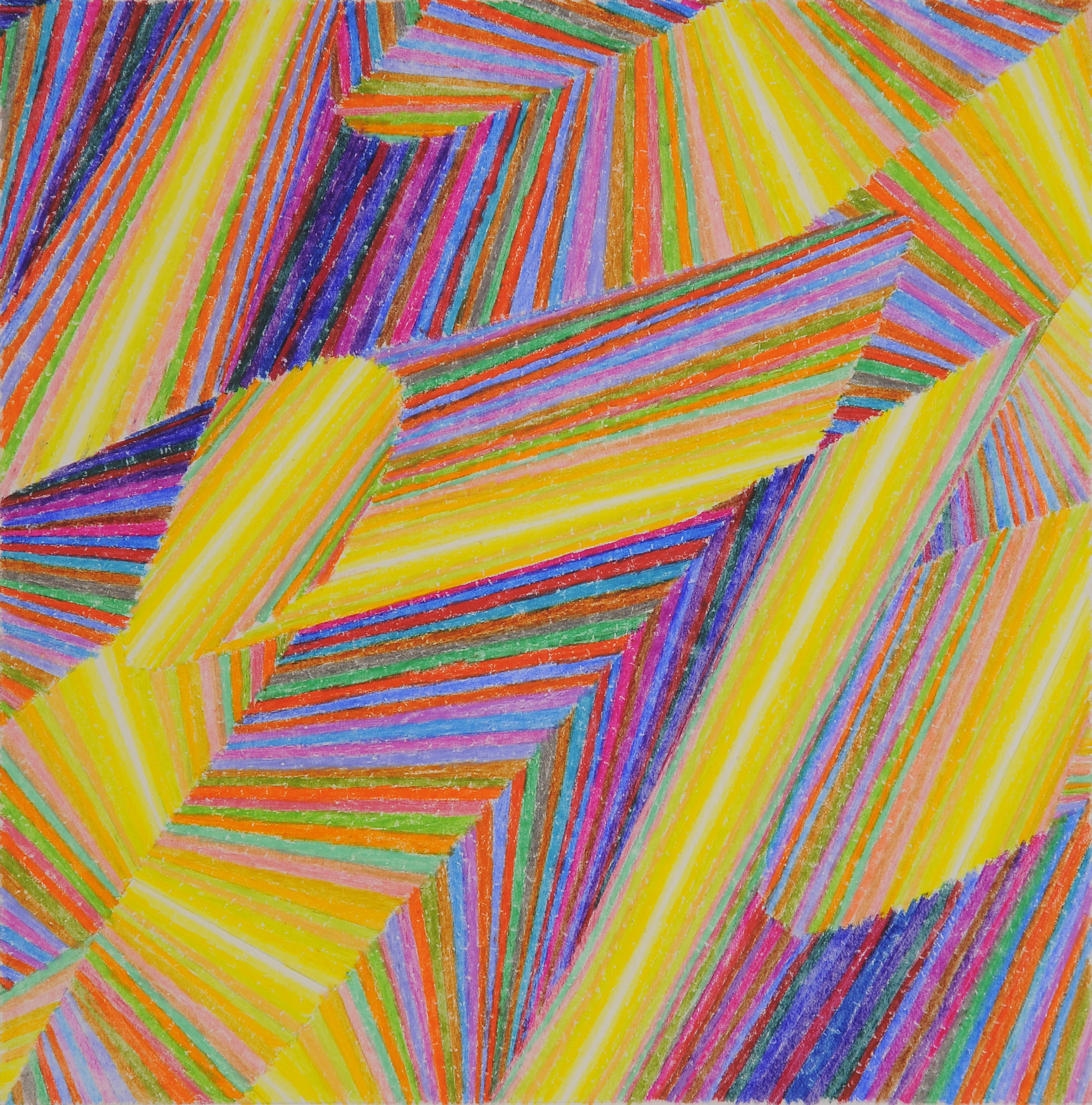
Helical drawing, 1972

As the geometric still-life series had satisfied her curiosity, Halaby found herself at a critical point on her artistic path. She felt that she could explore one of two directions, either focus on the individual and the self or life outside. She tested the first direction by doing a portrait of a friend but quickly decided to embrace the latter. She interpreted the idea of life outside the self as painting that expands its content outside the frame.

As a point of reference, Halaby had purchased several used books on geometry, with some devoted to pipe fitting. Her exploration of these books led to her Helixes and Cycloids series. A book that showed how to cut flat shapes that could make complex three-dimensional pipe fittings led her to fascination in plotting helical and later cycloid curves. Halaby would plot these curves on large sheets of graph paper and then would select sections to paint.

=== Diagonal Flight (1974–1979) ===
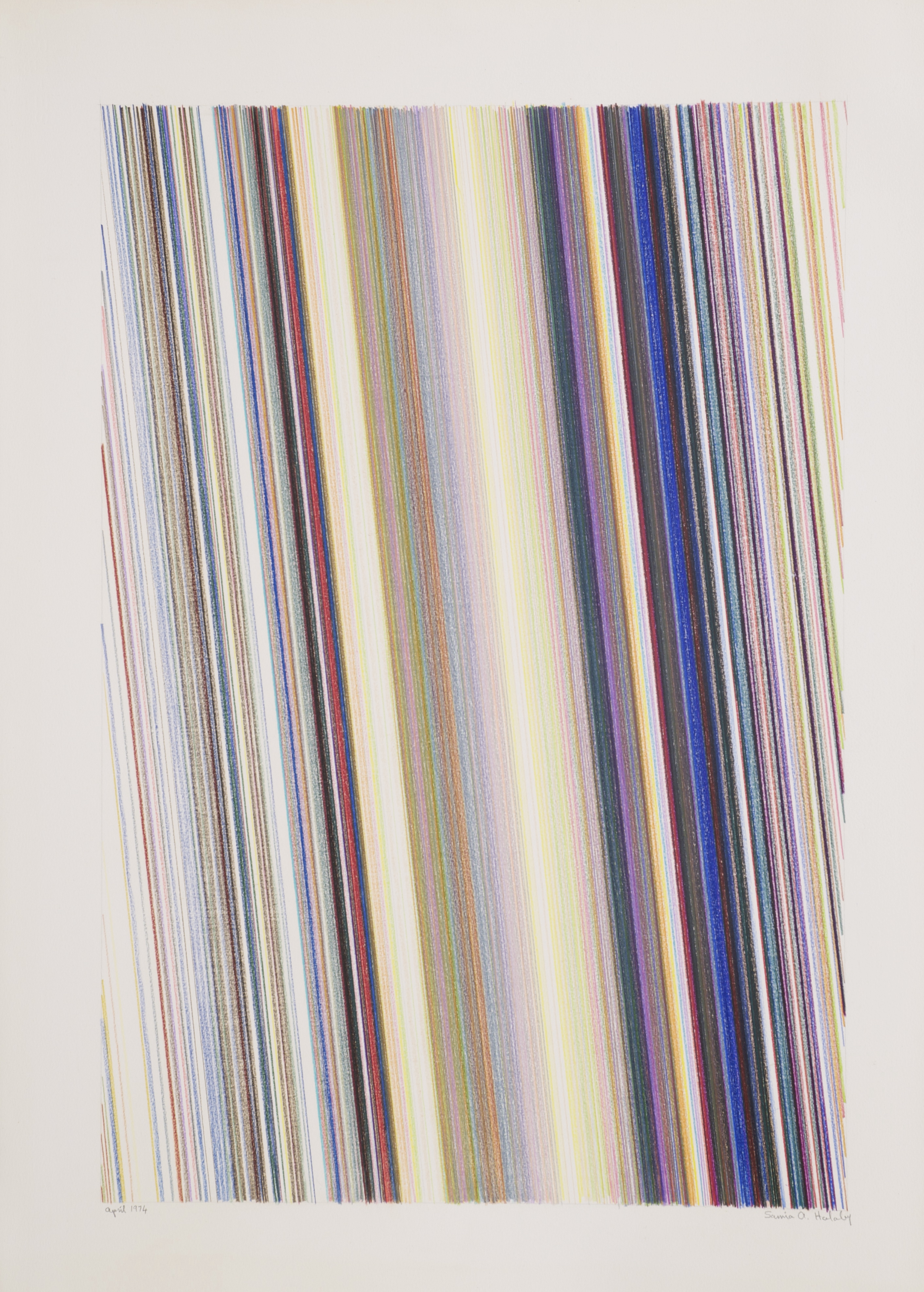
Untitled, 1974

While teaching at the Yale School of Art, Halaby worked on the new Diagonal Flight series. The title had occurred to her while watching children play with arms outstretched while running, making engine sounds, pretending to be airplanes. She had been wondering to which direction the diagonal horizons of her new paintings should lean. The children, being mostly right-handed, banked their pretend flight to the right. She determined immediately to follow their natural habits.

Although still cognizant of the commitment to pursue the idea of conjugation emanating from the geometric still lifes, Halaby was testing the irrationality of perspective and shading by creating an accurately shaded space that we cannot read according to our educated skills. How would viewers see a carefully shaded cylinder if it extended outside the perimeter of the painting on both ends? The information on the depth of the cylinder would be so concretely provided by the circular ends and would not be visible. The result was that scale became relative and the space of the paintings could easily be read as variedly colored horizons such as one might see out of the window of an airplane. Geometry and the convergence of measurements continued to dominate her thoughts.

=== Dome of the Rock (1980–1982) ===
In 1979, Halaby felt that she had reached the end of the Diagonal Flight series. Instead of experimenting with new directions, she stopped painting entirely for a short period then painted profusely, most of which she ultimately destroyed. It was an important pivotal moment where she shifted into the second broad phase of her artistic life, that of abstraction. In essence, Halaby explains, it was essentially a continuation of seeing but with the addition of the fourth dimension of time.

Finally, the Dome of the Rock series was inspired by a visit to Jerusalem in 1966. Forty-five-degree diagonal lines emanate from the corners while points of diamonds began and ended at measured locations on the perimeter. Here, she added cylinders and textures inspired by inlaid Arabic art.

=== Autumn Leaves and City Blocks (1982–1983) ===
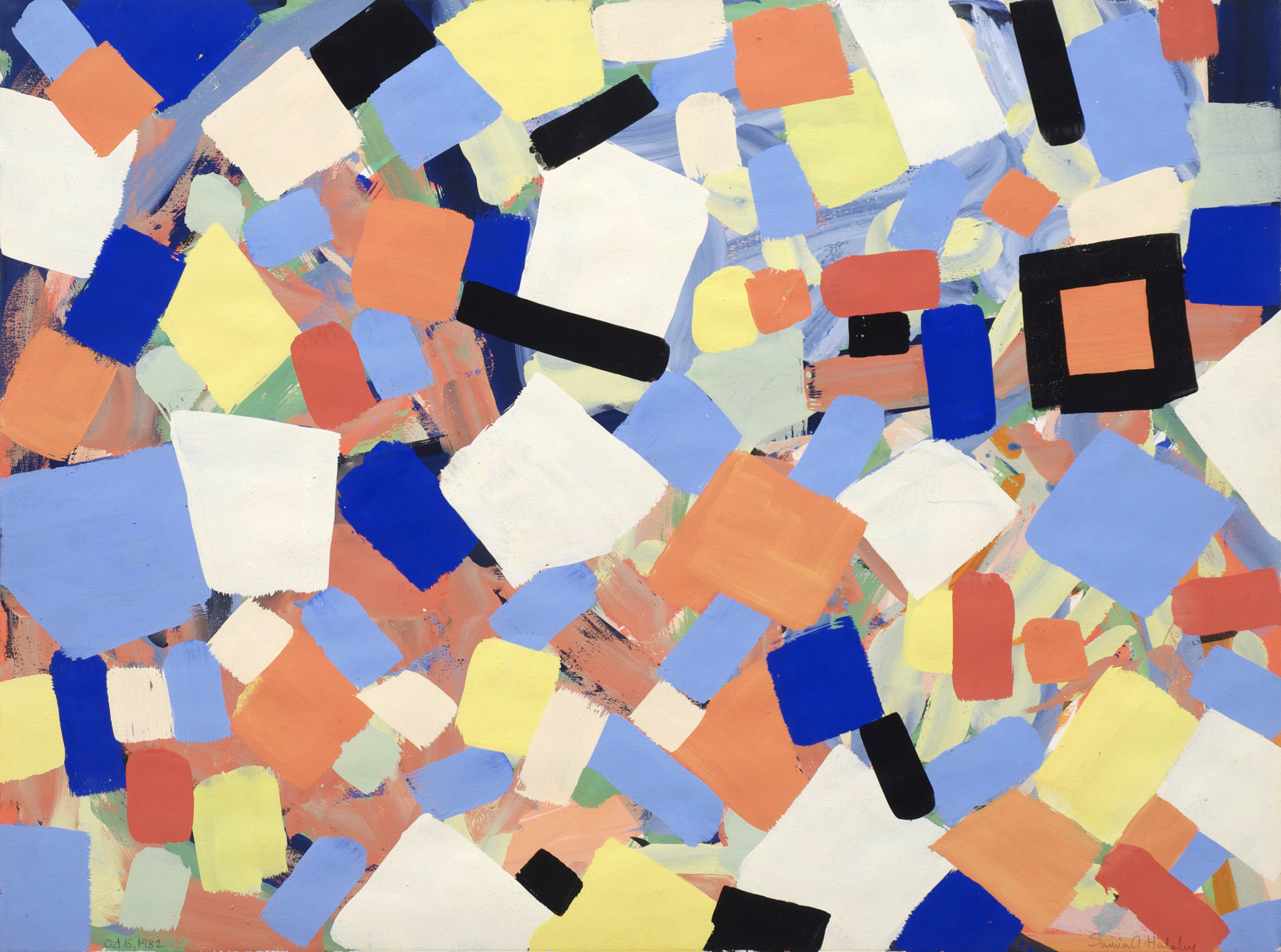
All Blue, 1982

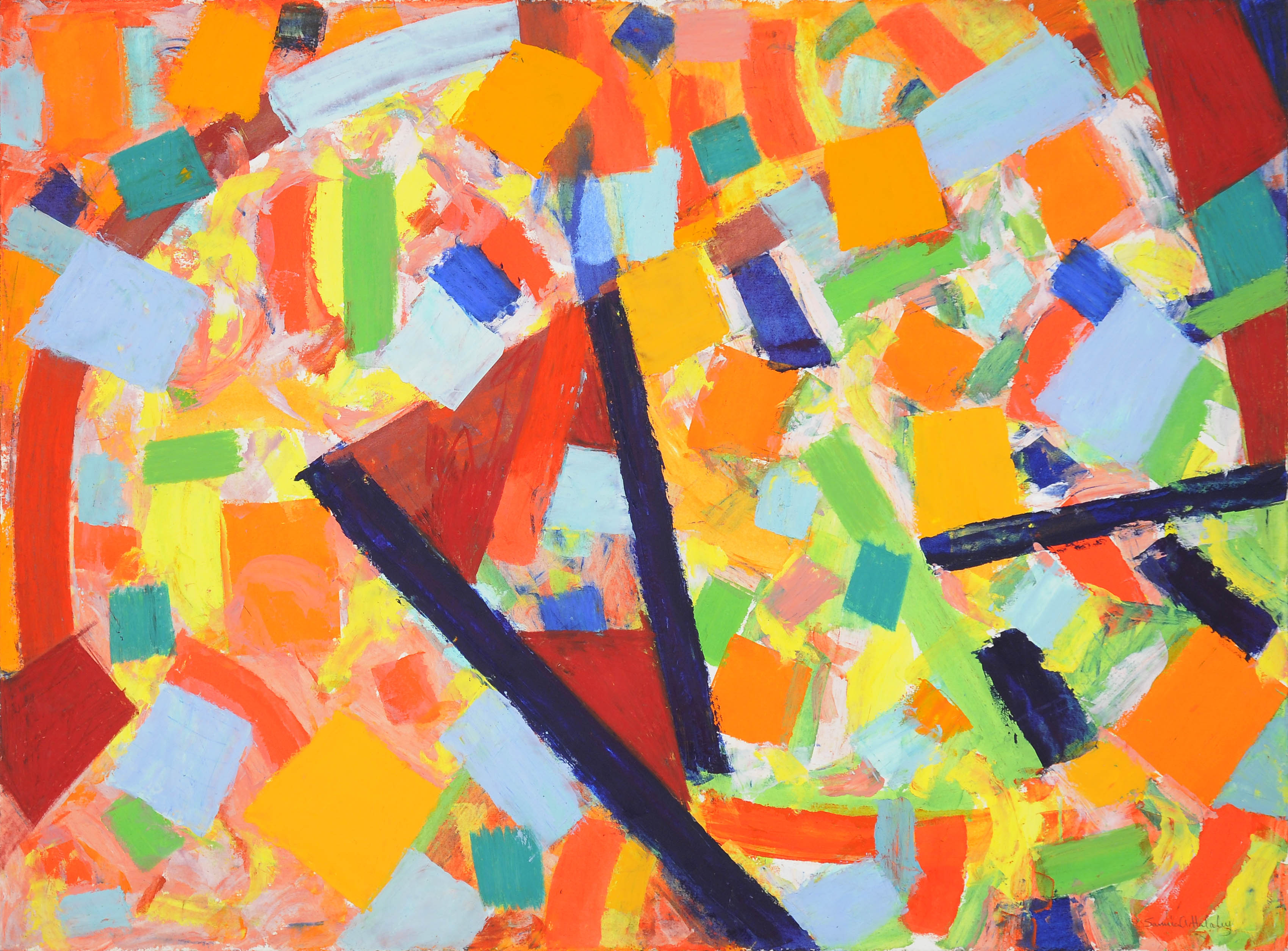
Prancing in the Vineyard, 1982

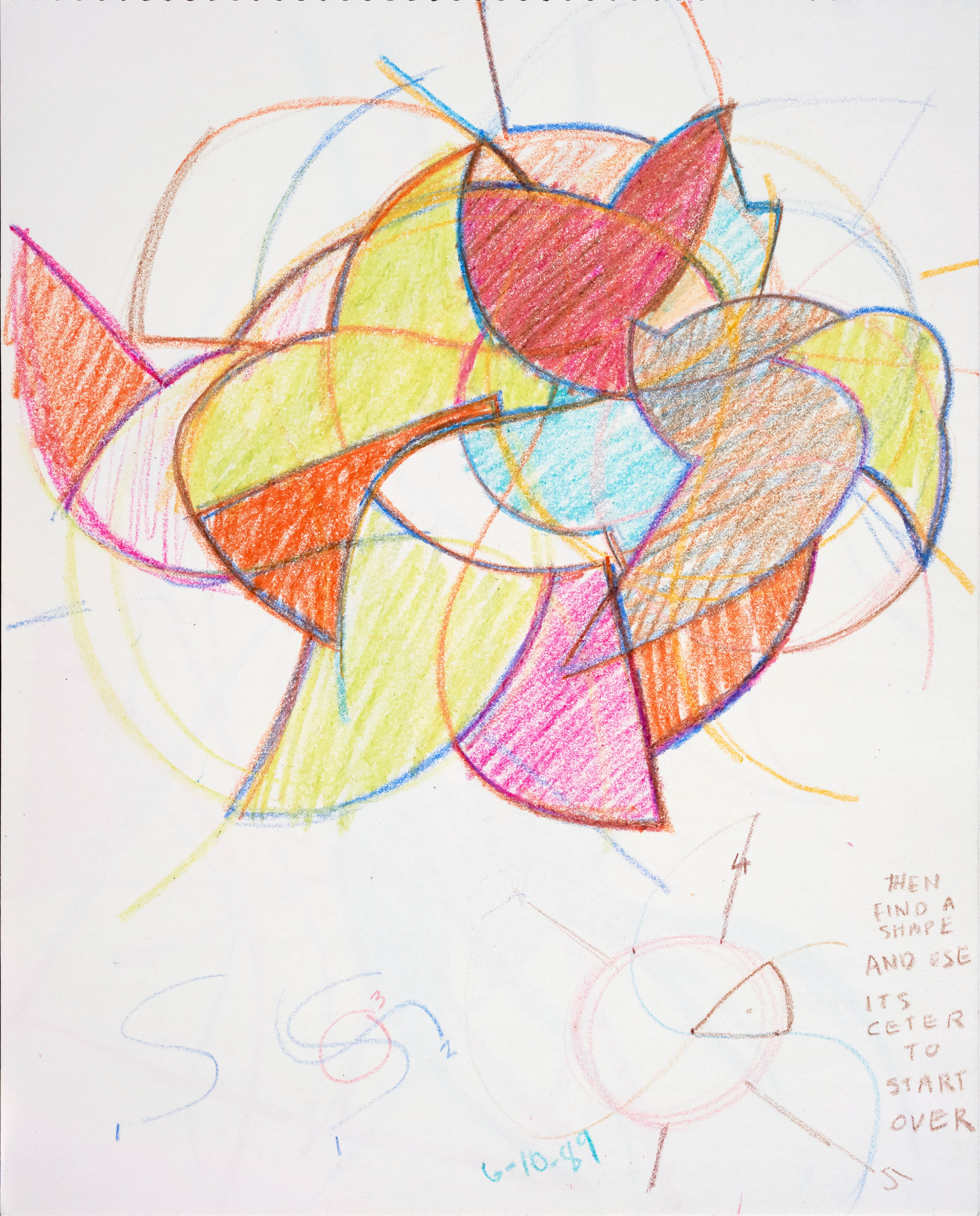
Sketchbook page from 1989

Another short series based on investigations the artist did many years earlier is Autumn Leaves and City Blocks. Her focus on the cells between veins in autumn leaves and their similarity to city blocks that she knew in New York connected together formed basis for this series. At that time Halaby lived in New York and commuted to New Haven while teaching at the Yale School of Art.

Halaby noticed that human building was dominated by the right angle, but that in the growth of highways and city blocks those right-angled rectangles were often disturbed and thus truncated by the necessities imposed by natural land formations. They resembled the cells between veins in a maple leaf. The ways in which bridges crossed rivers, at right angles then bend according to land formation also formed a part of the inspiration. Halaby determined that her paintings, to be as beautiful as nature, had to grow according to principles extracted from nature. Thus what is unique in this series is that it is based on the process of growth she observed in nature.

=== Growing Shapes and Centers of Energy (1984–1992) ===
Ideas regarding imitating principles of growth dominated her creativity during the 1980s. Her series Growing Shapes and Centers of Energy continued her interest in natural processes. She began to allow lines and shapes to actively change each other. A shape that is intersected by a line might divide itself into two. A line that received a shape may mirror itself in the shape's outline. Color and composition as well as the paintings perimeter all participated in this process of growth. Halaby was beginning to find her way through a new way of seeing and a new way of making abstract paintings, one that imitates the principles of nature not its appearance. Her work became more apparent in freely moving gestures and her more generally more intuitive in execution while her ideas remained strongly structures.

=== Kinetic painting (1983–1995) ===
Having been fascinated by computing since her days as a graduate student at Indiana University, Halaby began to focus on the relationship of art to the technology of its time. After retiring from teaching, Halaby began experimenting with electronic art forms during the 1980s, teaching herself how to program Basic and C programming languages on an Amiga 2000 computer. The results were short programs that ran on their own with abstract images in motion and with sound that she called kinetic paintings.

A few years later, during the early 1990s, Halaby began programing on a PC, converting the keyboard into an abstract painting piano. This program was also called Kinetic Painting and was not published but remained the artist's private tool. She used it to perform live with musicians. Multi-percussion musician, Kevin Nathaniel Hylton became her main collaborator as she began the public performance process utilizing her program. With musician Hasan Bakr they formed the Kinetic Painting Group and performed at numerous off-Broadway venues often accompanied by other musicians. In 2023, Halaby presented kinetic paintings on large-scale LED screens in public spaces at the Manar Abu Dhabi light art festival. These works were first developed in the 1990s, but were presented in a grander and newer architectural context.

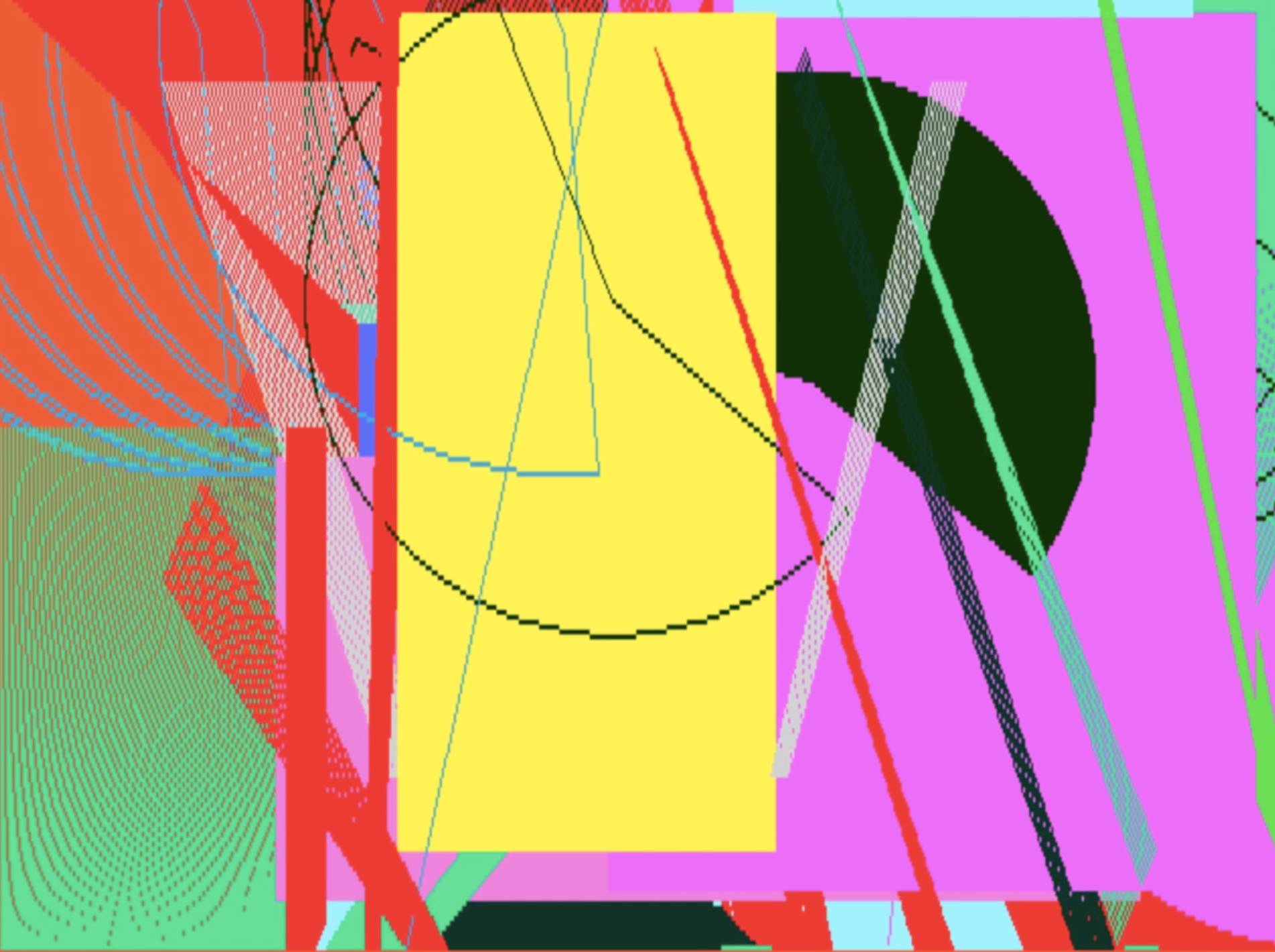
Still from Constructivist, 1987

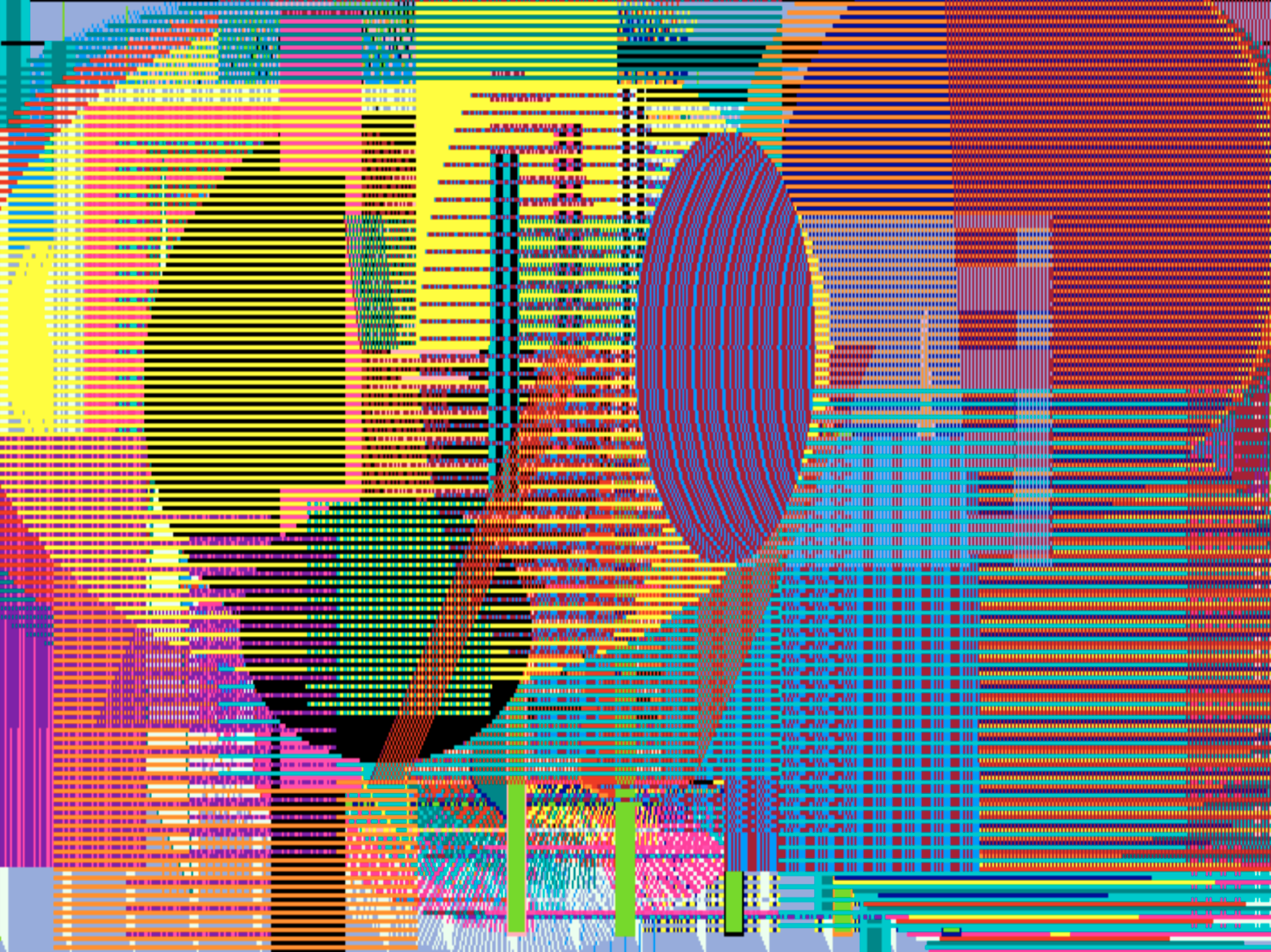
Still from lrw0, 1987

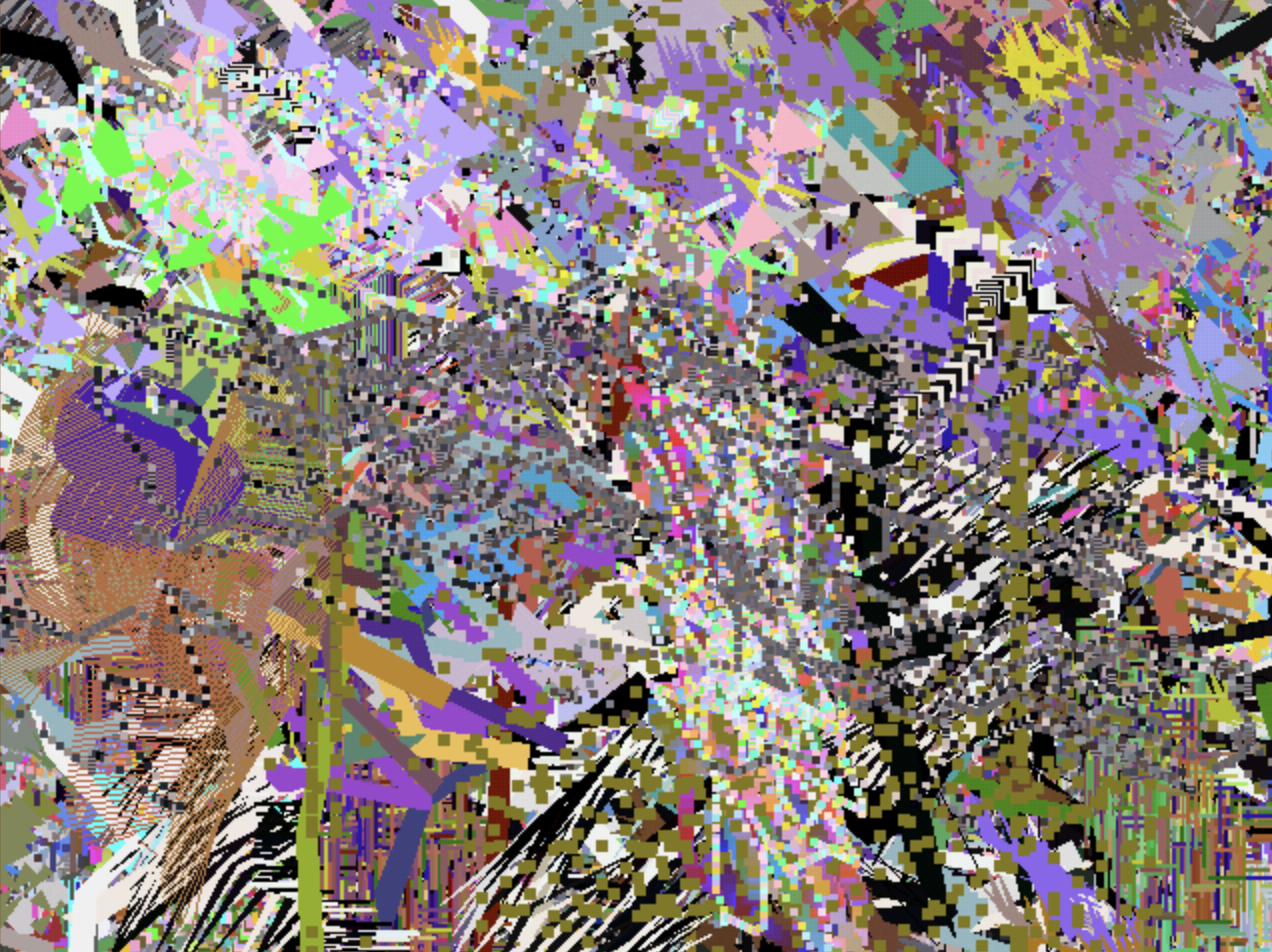
Still from Branching, 1994

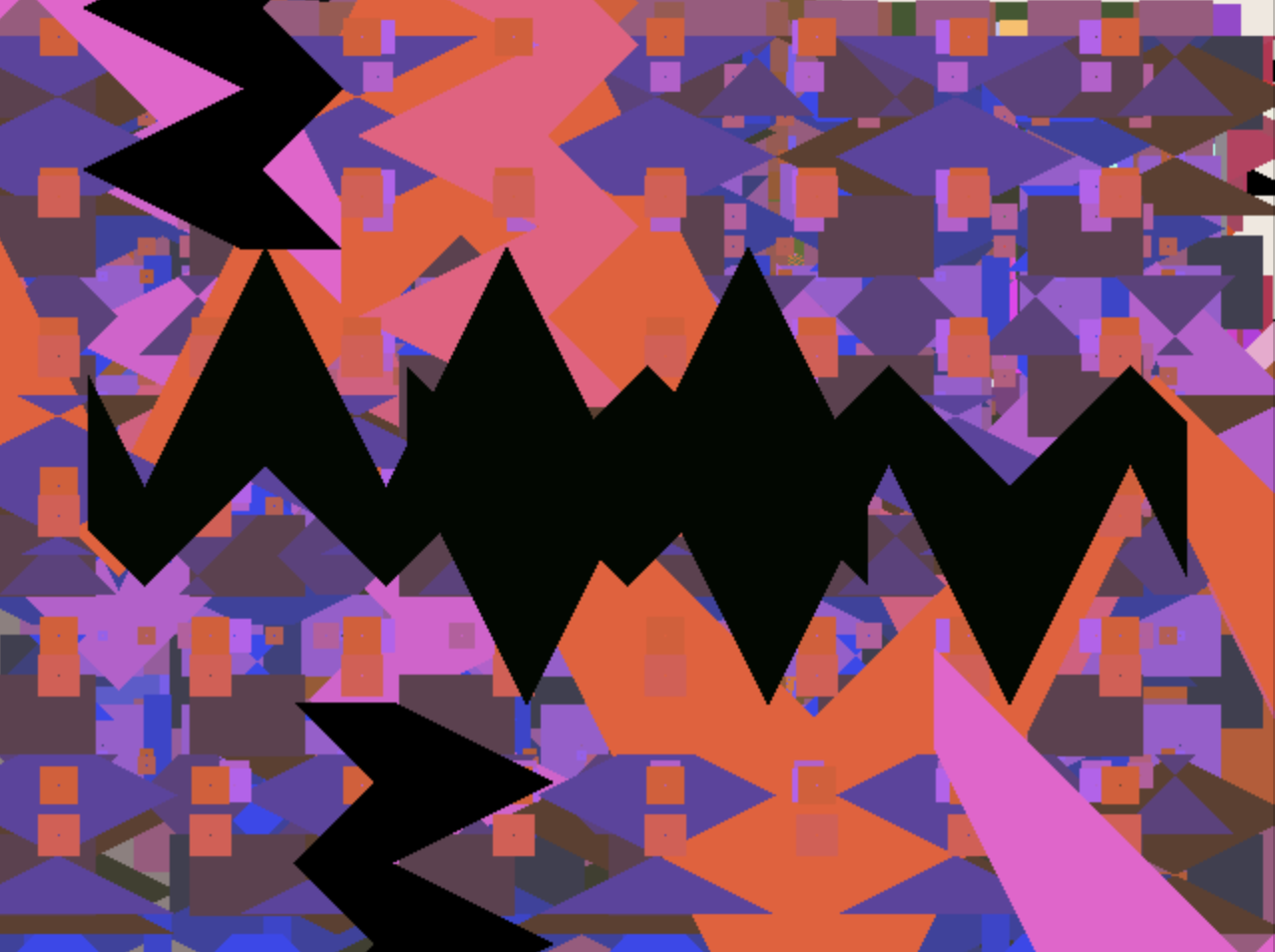
Still from Rhythms, 1994

=== Painterly abstraction (1991–2000) ===
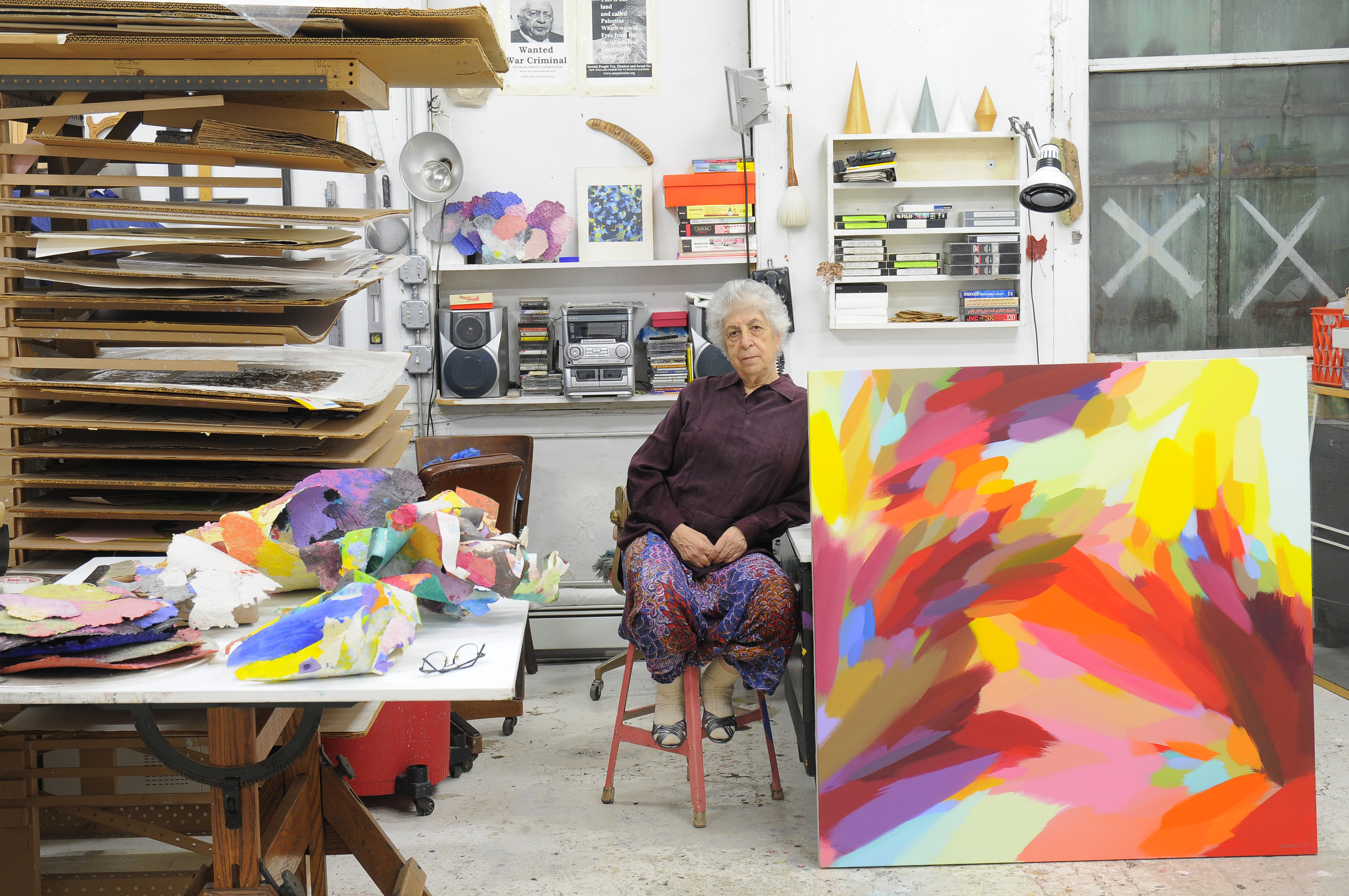
Halaby in her studio, 2016

Early in 1990, Halaby reviewed her entire practice and concluded that it was time to create space in the painting, relying only on brush marks as the building blocks of the work. Early in the 1980s she had removed shading and perspective; now she removed shape. Allowing only the distribution of brush marks in different size and color to create the space without reference to imagery was both hard and generative.

New references to how we see began to emerge. Halaby often talked about how our eyes shift focus from place to place while we walk and examine our surroundings. Thus how we look and not what we look at became the subject of the painting. As viewers see distribution of brush marks in a painting, they recognize their own habits of looking at the world and in ways that are not wholly clear, an experience of relative space in an abstract painting emerges.

=== "Free of the stretcher" (2000–2008) ===
Over her long career, Samia Halaby had always kept the picture plane and its perimeter in focus as a primary compositional player, but in 2000 she began to contemplate its removal. The result was a series of works "free of the stretcher," which she also called "hanging sculptures." Previously painted pieces of canvas were cut and reformed through stitching. Paint was applied before and after cutting and to both sides of the canvas fragments. The separate pieces were often treated like paintings in their own right. While aggregating the pieces she often felt inspired by the beauty of how leaves build to make magnificent trees.

==== Hanging Gardens ====
Hanging Gardens grew from Halaby's "free of the stretcher" painting where Halaby would cut parts of painted canvas and recombine them. Here, a need to collage the parts led to stitching them. Methods of attaching consecutive parts led to sensations of tree leaves and branches grew. "I was so deeply immersed in these aesthetic exploration feeling as though I was making trees that I had not noticed that the most important principle of growing trees is contradicted by my hanging soft stitchery. Thus the idea of hanging gardens suggested itself."

=== Intuitive search (2008–onwards) ===
Beginning with her relationship with the Ayyam gallery, Halaby began to rely on her intuitions attempting to exploit the whole of her experience without demanding that growth be a known process or planned exploration. Echoes of all that she had learnt on a long journey appeared in canvases larger than she had done earlier. This most recent period includes at least ten mural-sized works. It is a rich outpouring in pure abstract form that taps into the beauty of nature and of mankind's building.

== Critical reception ==
Despite her output and decades of institutional presence, Halaby's work received limited attention within mainstream Western art criticism for much of her career. Dorian Batycka situated her within a broader history of exclusion, noting that her marginalization reflected structural biases in the art world against women, Arab, and Palestinian artists working outside its dominant cultural centers.Her eventual acquisition by major institutions has been understood by critics as a belated recognition of a practice that had long operated outside of, and in deliberate resistance to, those institutions.

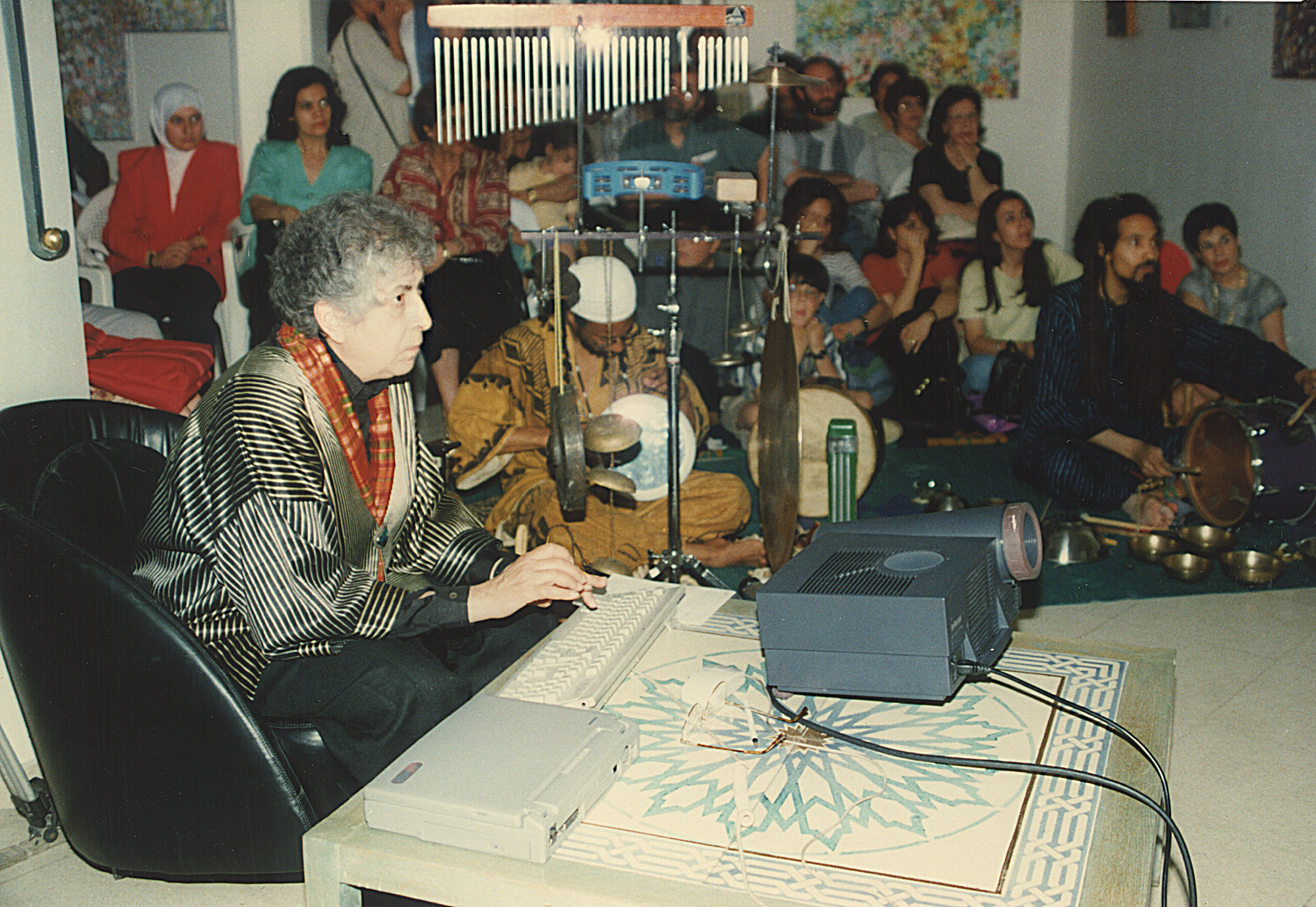
Halaby and the Kinetic Painting Group performing at Mona Atassi Gallery in Syria, 1997

== References in visual culture ==
Due to her recognition in both the contemporary Arab art scene and in the US-based activist community, Halaby has been the subject of a number of art works by other artists. The 2008 film Samia by Syrian filmmaker and conceptual artist Ammar Al-Beik was created around a taped interview with the artist. Al Beik includes Halaby's own footage of a trip to the West Bank, in which she narrates her stay there and later documents a trip to her grandmother's apartment in Jerusalem. This is interwoven with Al Beik's own sequences exploring the modern Palestinian condition. In 2011, the Palestinian conceptual artist Khalil Rabah included a portrait of Halaby for his large-scale project of "ready mades" that stood as a "subjective" overview of contemporary Palestinian art history. Rabah's portrait is based on a photograph from the artist's archive that was taken at one of her first exhibitions in the 1960s.

== Public collections including Halaby's work ==
- The Guggenheim Museum (New York and Abu Dhabi)
- The Art Institute of Chicago
- Detroit Institute of Art
- The Cleveland Museum of Art
- Cincinnati Art Museum
- Indianapolis Museum of Art
- The National Museum of Women in the Arts
- Mead Art Museum
- Arab World Institute
- Mathaf: Arab Museum of Modern Art
- Eskenazi Museum of Art, Indiana University
- Darat al Funun - The Khalid Shoman Foundation, Amman, Jordan

== Exhibitions of Palestinian art curated by Halaby ==
- Palestinian Art (2001), Headquarters of Union DC 1707, Manhattan, NY (curator)
- Williamsburg Bridges Palestine (2002), Williamsburg Art & Historical Center, Brooklyn, NY (co-curator with Zena El-Khalil)
- Palestine: Art of Resistance (2003), Tribes Gallery, Manhattan, NY (co-curator with Zena El-Khalil and Janine Al-Janabi)
- The Subject of Palestine (2004), Depaul Art Museum, Chicago, IL (curator) (which later traveled to the Jerusalem Fund Gallery in Washington DC in 2005)
- Art of Palestine (2005), Zeitgeist Gallery, Cambridge, MA (curator)

== Performances and presentations of Kinetic Painting Group ==
- Third and Fourth International Symposiums on Electronic Art (1993, 1994), Minneapolis, MN
- Brooklyn Museum of Art (1994)
- Philadelphia College of Art (1997)
- Galerie Le Pont (1997), Aleppo, Syria
- Atassi Gallery (1997), Damascus, Syria
- Sakakini Art Center (1997), Sakakini Art Center, Ramallah, West Bank
- Beirzeit University (1997), BeirZeit, West Bank
- Darat al Funun (1997), Amman, Jordan
- Lebanese American University (1998), Beirut, Lebanon
- Lincoln Center (1998)
- Williamsburg Art and Historical Center (1998), Brooklyn, New York
- Taipei Fine Arts Museum (2023), Taipei, Taiwan

== Publications ==
- Liberation Art of Palestine: Palestinian Painting and Sculpture in the Second Half of the 20th Century. New York: H.T.T.B. Publications, 2001. A survey of Palestinian painting and sculpture drawn from interviews with artists in the occupied territories.
- Samia Halaby: Five Decades of Painting and Innovation. London: Booth-Clibborn, 2014. Publication of color reproductions of a diversity of Halaby's work.
- Growing Shapes: Aesthetic Insights of an Abstract Painter. Wooster, OH: Palestine Books in collaboration with Ayyam Gallery, 2017. A theoretical account of how shapes evolved in her abstract painting practice from 1980s-on.
- Drawing the Kafr Qasem Massacre. Amsterdam: Schilt Publishing, 2017. Halaby's documentary drawings on the Kafr Qasem massacre, an attack on Palestinian Arab villagers by Israeli Border Police.
- Samia Halaby: Centers of Energy. Munich: Hirmer Publishers, 2024. Catalog for Halaby's unrealized retrospective which includes essays by the artists on her history of digital art and the theory of abstraction.
