= Bardo (bar) =

Gay bar and nightclub in Beirut

- Interactive map of Bardo
- Address: Myrtem House, Rue de Mexique, Hamra, Beirut, Lebanon
- Location: Hamra
- Coordinates: 33.8957°N 35.4830°E
- Owner: Mazen Khaled
- Type: Gay bar; nightclub

Construction
- Opened: 2006
- Closed: 2021

Bardo was a gay bar and nightclub in the Hamra neighborhood of Beirut in Lebanon.

== History ==

Bardo, a bar and restaurant on Rue de Mexique, a quiet street in Beirut’s lively Hamra district, was named after a Tibetan word for the spiritual zone between lives. The bar was located in Myrtom House, a former restaurant run since the 1940s by a Jewish couple, Myriam and Thomas, who had fled Nazi rule in Austria or Germany for Lebanon. The restaurant had been named after them.

== Atmosphere ==
By day, it operated as a calm workspace; by night, it transformed into a lounge bar. Visitors found simple contemporary design with a Levantine touch in the form of brightly colored poufs and a golden ceiling.

== Impact on the LGBTQ community ==
According to The New Arab, Bardo was widely regarded by Beirut's queer community as a defining venue of its generation. Offering a safe space for the community, it became a well-known gathering place for the city's queer community.

It wasn’t the first place in Beirut known for attracting a queer clientele, but its floor-seating area, where guests were not required to purchase anything, made it an accessible gathering place for younger queer people with limited means. It hosted countless drag shows and featured many artists through readings, concerts and various events that engaged the local creative scene. It became an important entry point into Beirut’s queer scene for people arriving in the city.

The Guardian described the bar in 2018 as the “epicentre” of the city's gay scene. Bardo also hosted drag events, including the weekly Powerpuff Queens party, linking Beirut's developing drag culture with its nightlife.

Before closing on October 30, 2021, Bardo had operated for fifteen years, becoming a successful example of a queer business thriving in a political and social environment often hostile to LGBTQ expression.

== See also ==
- LGBTQ rights in Lebanon
- Acid (bar)
