= Sandra Dagher =

Lebanese curator

Sandra Dagher (born 1978 in Beirut, Lebanon) is a Lebanese curator. Considered as an “art activist”, she currently is the advisor and head of programs of the Saradar Collection.

== Profile ==
In 2000, Sandra Dagher took over the management of Espace SD, a multipurpose art space in the Gemmayzeh district of Beirut that had been launched in 1998 by Wadih Safieddine and Karine Wehbé. Spread on 3 floors, Espace SD featured a temporary exhibition, a permanent gallery like collection of artworks, a bookstore, and designer corner. Many events were organized including concerts, festivals, art courses and cine club. After the 2006 Lebanon War, Sandra Dagher organized with Zena El Khalil Nafas Beirut, a multimedia exhibition including 40 artists testimonies of the war. Espace SD closed its doors in April 2007. On the following year, Sandra Dagher collaborated with Naila Kettaneh Kunigk, owner of Munich based galerie Tanit. They curated together solo exhibitions for Lamia Joreige, Nadim Asfar and Hubert Fattal.

Meanwhile, Sandra Dagher curated with Saleh Barakat the 1st Lebanese Pavilion at the 2007 Venice Biennale. The Pavilion featured a collective exhibition of Fouad Elkoury, Lamia Joreige, Walid Sadek, Mounira al Solh and Akram Zaatari.

In 2009, Sandra Dagher and Lamia Joreige launched the Beirut Art Center, a non-profit venue for contemporary art. They had been working on the idea for many years and had to confront many difficulties related to the country’s situation. Since its opening, BAC organized numerous events including solo exhibitions for Lebanese, Arab and foreign artists such as Emily Jacir, Akram Zaatari, Mona Hatoum, Bernard Khoury, Paola Yacoub, Harun Farocki and Chris Marker.

In 2011, Sandra Dagher and Lamia Joreige organized “Museum as Hub: Beirut Art Center” at New York City's New Museum.

In 2012, Sandra Dagher joined the Saradar Collection, devoted to Lebanese art from the contemporary and modern periods.
