= Acid (bar) =

Gay bar and nightclub in Beirut

Coordinates: 33.86918126223449°N 35.53441850290407°E

- Interactive map of Acid
- Address: Acid was located in Sin el Fil, a Beirut suburb
- Location: Rue 5e, Sin el Fil, Matn District
- Owner: George Jabria
- Type: Gay bar; nightclub

Construction
- Opened: 1998
- Closed: 2010

Acid was a nightclub in the Sin el Fil suburb of Beirut in Lebanon.

== History ==
Acid opened in 1998 by George Jabria, who would later open Pulse. Although it did not initially set out to attract the LGBTQ community, Acid came to be considered Beirut’s main gay nightclub, a position it maintained for several years.

One of the reasons for Acid's rise as a gay venue is the fact that, in the post-war years of the early 1990s, Beirut nightclubs commonly refused entry to men unaccompanied by women, primarily to keep gay men out, but Acid differed by admitting men for a fee of 30,000 Lebanese pounds, approximately US$20 at the time.

Acid's reputation as Beirut's notorious gay club brought it attention, not often for the good. The nightclub was raided by police twice, although neither raid was related to the sexual orientation of its clientele. One raid was conducted in connection with drug-related allegations, while the other, in 2003, was part of a police investigation into suspected Satan worship. In 2010, Al Jaras, a local tabloid, published a homophobic and scathing attack on Lebanon’s LGBTQ community, using Acid as an example.

The club closed in 2010 amid competition from other Beirut venues. The building still stands, but it is now occupied by another business.

== Atmosphere ==
Located in a non-residential area of the hilly suburb of Sin el Fil, overlooking the Beirut River, the club was designed as circular concrete bunker, painted black inside and fitted with flashing lights and a powerful sound system.

The club had a Nataraja statue behind the long bar and on a large wall, there was Khajuraho-like kitsch plastic sculptures, influenced by the erotic iconography of the Hindu temples of Madhya Pradesh.

== Impact on the LGBTQ community ==
While other venues, such as B 018, were considered gay-friendly, Acid became the first nightclub in Beirut to be regarded as openly gay, attracting both locals and foreign tourists, with weekend queues often extending around the block

The impact of Acid and other venues, such B 018, extended beyond LGBTQ+ communities in Lebanon and the Arab world, reaching queer Arab communities globally. This influence was particularly evident in Sydney, where members of the queer Arab community established Club Arak, a space that allowed them to experience and embrace their identities as both gay and Arab.

== See also ==
- LGBTQ rights in Lebanon
