= B 018 =

Nightclub in Beirut, Lebanon

B 018 (Nightclub)
- B Zero Dix-Huit
- B 018 logo

- Aerial view of B 018 in Karantina, Beirut.
- Location of B 018 in Beirut
- Address: El Khodor, Beirut; Karantina, Beirut; Lebanon
- Coordinates: 33.89852°N 35.53422°E
- Owner: Naji Gebran
- Capacity: 500
- Type: Electronic Music, Music venue, Jazz,

Construction
- Opened: 1994 (original venue); 1998 (Karantina venue)
- Rebuilt: 1998
- Years active: 1994-present
- Architect: Bernard Khoury

Website
- www.b018.org

B 018 is a nightclub founded by Naji Gebran in 1994 in Sin el Fil, Lebanon. In 1998, it relocated to Beirut’s Karantina district, occupying an underground building designed by architect Bernard Khoury. The building incorporates a hydraulically operated retractable roof that opens the interior to the sky and surrounding city.

The venue closed in 2024 and reopened on 20 July 2026, with Omran Gebran overseeing its musical direction.

== History ==
In the 1980s while Lebanon was still amidst war, Naji Gebran believed in music as therapy to ease the stress of the war. He started organizing parties, under the name Musical Therapy, at his chalet. According to Bethan Ryder in his book, Bar and Club, parties were later code-named B 018 due to the chalet's location 18 kilometers north of Beirut. Others have attributed the name, B 018, to the security, access-code number of the chalet. Another urban legend claimed that the number or the address of the chalet was B 018. In any case, the parties became so popular and overcrowded that in 1993, Naji moved them to a warehouse in an industrial area of Sin El Fil in 1994. The club was then officially Christened B 018 the venues predominant musical policy during its first incarnation was centered on contemporary and traditional Arabic music, Acid Jazz, Jazz and World Music sounds.

In 1998, Bernard Khoury was hired to build a new home for B 018 at the Quarantaine, the neighborhood that witnessed some of the most horrific atrocities during the war. The plot of land where the club was built was believed to be the site of the former Palestinian refugee camp. In his design, Khoury wanted to arouse bottled-up remembrances of the war and that was expressed in the club itself, which was sunk in the ground like a communal grave, and seats inside were shaped like coffins. The design of B 018 has been labeled as "war architecture". The design included a circular iron plate that could be moved to cover the entire hypogeal night club at closing time so that from a bird's-eye view, the club resembled a helicopter landing pad. During operation hours, the same covering plates could be lifted up, transforming the club into an open-air discothèque where revelers on the underground dance floor found themselves suddenly dancing under the starry sky of Beirut and their gyrating movements where reflected on the mirrored surfaces of the plates.

== Atmosphere ==
The club is one of Beirut's most popular discothèques. Known for its liberal atmosphere, the club has always been popular with artists and gay and lesbian patrons. It is believed to be the first nightclub in Beirut where gay men were able to convene openly. It is often frequented by international celebrities such as, Naomi Campbell and Dee Dee Bridgewater. Wallpaper magazine chose B018 as one of the best clubs in the world in 2004, 2005, and 2006.

== Academic discourse ==
The club was the subject of Bernard Khoury's lecture, "New Wars in Progress" that was given at the University of Michigan's, School of Art & Design in 2009.

It was also the subject of Khoury's lecture, "Combat Architecture", for the Lebanese Club at MIT in the Massachusetts Institute of Technology.

== In fiction ==
- The Cyclist: A Novel by Viken Berberian

As I ride to B 018, a stench more putrid than death permeates the night. It tickles my urge for a steak, causes my appetite to ache. B 018 is an industrial dance club tucked in a deserted district called The Quarantine.

== See also ==
- List of electronic dance music venues
- Superclub
