= Nadim Asfar =

Lebanese photographer and filmmaker

- Born: 1976 (age 49–50); Beirut, Lebanon
- Education: Académie Libanaise des Beaux-Arts (ALBA), Beirut; * École Nationale Supérieure Louis Lumière, Paris * École des Hautes Études en Sciences Sociales, Paris
- Occupations: Photographer, Filmmaker
- Years active: 2004–present
- Notable work: Constellations, Experiencing the Mountain, Habiter le Jour

Nadim Asfar (born in 1976 in Beirut, Lebanon) is a French-Lebanese photographer and filmmaker. He currently lives and works between Paris and Beirut. He studied cinematography at the Académie Libanaise des Beaux-Arts ALBA Beirut and then photography at the École Nationale Supérieure Louis Lumière (Paris) before engaging in the theory of arts and languages at the École des Hautes Études en Sciences Sociales.

== Work ==
The artistic approach of Nadim Asfar is strongly influenced by the numerous questions raised by the language and technique of photography. His photographs and films attempt to capture his relationship to the outside world. Interrogating the relationships between apparatus, body and space, he produces works that explore time and space, whether in the interior, intimate realm of the house or in the wide expanses of natural landscapes. Stemming from a background that is both experimental and theoretical, his approach is at the meeting of considerations that are visual and acoustic, poetic and aesthetic, philosophical and anthropological.

He presented his first solo exhibition “Juin” at Fadi Mogabgab Gallery (Beirut), in 2004. In 2005, he was part of "Regards des photographes arabes contemporains", a collective exhibition of Arab photographers at the Institut du Monde Arabe in Paris. He showed a comprehensive selection of works in “Immaterial World”, organized in 2008 by Naila Kettaneh Kunigk and Sandra Dagher. In 2009, his project Innenleben was selected in Exposure, the Beirut Art Center’s first annual presentation of emerging artists. The same work was published in the Issue 20 / Talent of Foam Magazine and later on presented in Galerie Tanit's booth at Paris Photo.

A popular series is the Constellations. Each piece is a grid composition of a varying number of pictures Nadim Asfar shot from the balcony of his apartment in Mar Mkhayel, Beirut. This work was exhibited at Galerie Tanit, Paris Photo and the FFA headquarters. He later reclaimed this work in 2018 in the form of an artist’s book, “Habiter le Jour”, focusing on the gestures, postures and stilled movements of anonymous passersby and on the passage of cars, motorcycles, trucks and other vehicles.

Also in 2018, Nadim Asfar published another photographic book presenting an array of images of flowers and diverse plants that he had taken in his early career using the photogram technique which is a camera-less technique that produced floral photogenic drawings. These are placed in direct relationship with images of Beirut and of the family apartment from the balcony of which these plants were gathered before being placed under the developer.

Starting 2014, Nadim Asfar began work on “Experiencing the Mountain”, a project dealing with the mountainous landscape of Lebanon, taking the role of a land surveyor, capturing thousands of photographs across the country. In this work, he interrogates the role of aesthetic representation and of the photographer’s point of view in landscape photography as much as the role of beauty and poetry in a nationalized politicized and war-affected territory. This endeavour was inaugurated with a short film shown for the first time at the Heartland – Territoires d’Affects exhibition at the Beirut Exhibition Center in 2015. A selection of photographs in large-scale formats were displayed at the “Where I End and You Begin” exhibition at Galerie Tanit in 2016 and again at the Beiteddine Palace at the occasion of its annual festival in 2018.

== Selected exhibitions ==
=== Solo ===
- Nadim Asfar The Mountain, Curated by Hester Keijser, Photo Ireland Festival, Museum of Contemporary Photography of Ireland, Dublin, 2019
- Where I end and you begin, Beiteddine Palace, Beiteddine, 2018
- Where I end and you begin, Galerie Tanit, Beirut, 2016
- Nadim Asfar, Galerie OÙ, Marseille, 2011
- Immaterial World, Galerie Tanit, Beirut, 2008
- Juin, Galerie Fady Mogabgab, Beirut, 2003

=== Group ===
- Third Biennale of Contemporary Arab Photographers, Arab World Institute, Paris, 2019
- La Fabrique des illusions : Collection Fouad Debbas et commentaires contemporains, Curated by François Cheval and Yasmine Chemali, Sursock Museum, Beirut, 2019
- Across Boundaries, Beirut Art Fair, 2018
- Poetics, Politics, Places, Bienal Sur Argentina, 2017
- Rencontres Improbables, OQBO Galery, Berlin, 2016
- Territoire d'Affect, Beirut Exhibition Center, Beirut, 2015
- Seing Is Believing, KW/Kunst Werke, Berlin, 2011
- Liquid Archives — Notes on Relations, Ruptures and Silences, Platform 3, Berlin, 2009
- Exposure, Beirut Art Center, Beirut, 2009
- Regards des Photographes Arabes Contemporains, Institut du Monde Arabe, Paris, 2006

== Filmography ==
- Eaux Territoriales (2015)
- Everyday Madonna (2009)
- Empreinte (2007)
- Trouble (2000)

== Publications ==
- Hyper Images, published by Kaph books, 2018
- Habiter le Jour, published by Kaph books, 2018

== Awards ==
- Chevalier de l'Ordre des Arts et des Lettres, French Minister of Culture, 2014
- Prix d'Honneur du Salon d'Automne, Paris, 2003
- First Prize for short film "Trouble" at the Festival du Film Européen, Beyrouth, 2001
