= Lamia Joreige =

Lebanese visual artist and filmmaker

- Born: 1972 (age 53–54); Beirut, Lebanon
- Education: Rhode Island School of Design
- Known for: Painting; photography

Lamia Joreige (born in Beirut, Lebanon) is a Lebanese visual artist and filmmaker. She received a BFA (Painting, Filmmaking) from Rhode Island School of Design, Providence, Rhode Island. Since the late 1990s, her works have been widely displayed. She is a co founder and co director (with Sandra Dagher) of the Beirut Art Center. In 2011, Sandra Dagher and Lamia Joreige organized “Museum as Hub: Beirut Art Center” at New York City's New Museum.

== Work ==
Lamia Joreige works with various media including painting, writing, photography, video and installation. She explores the archive and other subjects related to memory.

Objects of War, a series of testimonials on the Lebanese War was acquired by the Tate Modern in 2011, being the first major piece of a Lebanese artist on display in this museum’s permanent collections. Her video Beirut, Autopsy of a City is part of Story Board, a digital hub produced by the San Francisco Museum of Modern Art.

== Publications ==
- Works 1994–2017, Lamia Joreige (Kaph Books, 2018)
- Time and the other (Alarm Editions, 2004)
- Ici et peut-être ailleurs / Hier, und vielleicht anderswo (Haus der Kulturen der Welt, 2003)

== Selected exhibitions ==
=== Solo exhibitions ===
- Under-Writing Beirut, Marfa Projects, Beirut, 2017
- After the River, Radcliffe Institute for Advanced Study at Harvard University, 2017
- Records for uncertain Times, Art Factum Gallery, Beirut, 2013
- A Strange Feeling of Familiarity, Galerie Tanit, Munich, 2009
- Strange Feeling of Familiarity, Naila Kettaneh Kunigk, Beirut, 2008
- Time and the Other, Alexandria Contemporary Art Forum, 2006
- Time and the Other, Townhouse Gallery, Cairo, 2005
- Time and the Other, Galerie Janine Rubeiz, Beirut, 2004
- Ici et peut-être ailleurs, Musée Nicéphore Niepce, Chalon-sur-Saône, 2004
- Le Déplacement, Galerie Janine Rubeiz, Beirut, 2001
- Objets de Guerre & Le Déplacement, Nikki D. Marquardt Gallery, Paris, 2000
- Paintings, Galerie Janine Rubeiz, Beirut, 1999
- Surfaces, French Cultural Center, Beirut, 1997

=== Group exhibitions ===
- Cycles Of Collapsing Progress, curated by Karina El Helou and Anissa Touati, Rashid Karami International Fair, Tripoli, Lebanon
- Across Boundaries. Focus on Lebanese Photography, curated by Tarek Nahas, Beirut Art Fair 2018
- On the Edgware Road, Serpentine Gallery, London, 2012
- Beirut, Kunsthalle Wien, Vienna, 2011
- All That Fits: The Aesthetics of Journalism, Quad, Derby, 2011
- Told Untold Retold, Mathaf Arab Museum of Modern Art, Doha, 2010
- All about Beirut, Kunsthalle White Box, Munich, 2010
- The Storyteller (Touring exhibition), Museo Nacional Centro de Arte Reina Sofia, Madrid, 2010
- The Storyteller (Touring exhibition), Art Gallery of Ontario, Toronto, 2010
- Bless my homeland forever, Kunsthalle, Exnergasse, 2010
- Usages du document, Centre Culturel Suisse, Paris, 2009
- Provisions for the Future: Past of the Coming Days, Sharjah Biennial 09, Sharjah, 2009
- Zones of Conflict, Pratt Manhattan Gallery, New York, 2009
- Lebanon Now, Darat al Funun, Amman, 2008
- Foreword, Pavilion of Lebanon, 52nd Venice Biennale, 2007
- Coding Decoding, Museum of Contemporary Art, Roskilde, 2006
- Rumour as Media, Akbank Sanat, Istanbul, 2006
- Out of Beirut, Modern Art Oxford, Oxford, 2006
- Consumption of Justice, Dyarbakir Art Center, Dyarbakir, 2005
- Presence Absence, Tanit Gallery, Munich, 2004
- DisORIENTation, Haus der Kulturen der Welt, Berlin, 2003
- Bater Dance Project (with Zeid Hamdane), Hamdane House, Bater, 2002
- Missing Links, Townhouse Gallery, Cairo, 2001
- Hamra Street Project, Cinema Colisée, Beirut, 2000
