= Zena El Khalil =

Lebanese artist, writer & activist (born 1976)

- Born: 1976 (age 49–50); London, England
- Education: School of Visual Arts, American University of Beirut
- Website: zenaelkhalil.com

Zena El Khalil (born 1976) is a Lebanese artist, writer, and activist.

== Biography ==
El Khalil attained her undergraduate degree from the American University in Beirut. In 2002 El Khalil received her Masters of Fine Arts from the School of Visual Arts in New York.

El Khalil works in a variety of formats ranging from painting, installation, performance, mixed media, writing, video, and collage. Themes that are central to her work include issues of violence as well as gender using materials found throughout Beirut. Photocopied images of militiamen and women, civilians and family members are embellished with plastic flowers, glitter, strings of lights, keffiyehs, plastic toy soldiers, toy AK-47s, arabesques, beads, fabrics, and other objects. She has had solo exhibitions in London, Munich, and Beirut. El Khalil currently lives and works in Beirut.

During the July War in Lebanon, El Khalil immediately began maintaining beirutupdate from her apartment in Beirut. Her blog was a personal account of the siege on Beirut that lasted for 33 days and its impact on her and the people around her. It quickly received international attention and was highly publicized on news portals such as CNN and the BBC. Excerpts were published in daily papers, including The Guardian and Der Spiegel Online. Her writing was also included in the anthology Lebanon, Lebanon published by Saqi Books. In the aftermath of that war, Zena El Khalil curated with Sandra Dagher Nafas Beirut, a multimedia exhibition including 40 artists testimonies of the war.

In 2008 El Khalil also completed her first novel, Beirut, I Love You. The book is a memoir about El Khalil's life from 1994 to the present and specifically focuses on growing up in Beirut during a period of immense turmoil. There are also rumors that the book is going to be made into a film.

== Work ==
=== Solo exhibitions ===
- 2017 "Sacred Catastrophe: Healing Lebanon" – Beit Beirut, Beirut, Lebanon
- 2008 "Maybe One Day Beirut Will Love Me Back." – The Flawless Gallery, Berardi-Sagharchi Projects London, UK
- 2006 "I Love You." – Espace SD, Beirut, Lebanon
- 2004 "Wahad Areese, Please!" ("A Husband, Please!") – Le Laboratoire, Espace SD, Beirut, Lebanon
- 2003 "of love and war..." – Signature Art Gallery, Lagos, Nigeria

=== Selected group exhibitions ===
- 2013 "Arab Express: The Latest Art from the Arab World" Mori Art Museum, Tokyo, Japan
- 2013 "Art13 London" – Olympia Grand Hall, London, UK
- 2012 "Art is the Answer!" Villa Empain, Brussels, Belgium
- 2008 "But, I Can't Let Go" Galerie Tanit, Munich, Germany
- 2007 "The Resilient Landscape" – Ivan Dougherty Gallery, Sydney Australia
- "More Than Light Could Bear" – Art Lounge, Beirut, Lebanon
- "Ana "Njassa Al Fan" ("I Pear Art") – Dialogpunkt Deutsch, Tripoli, Lebanon
- 2006 "Pure Pop" – Art Lounge, Beirut, Lebanon
- "Nafas Beirut" – Espace SD Beirut, Lebanon
- "Imagining Ourselves" – International Museum of Women, San Francisco, USA
