= Bernard Khoury =

Lebanese architect (born 1969)

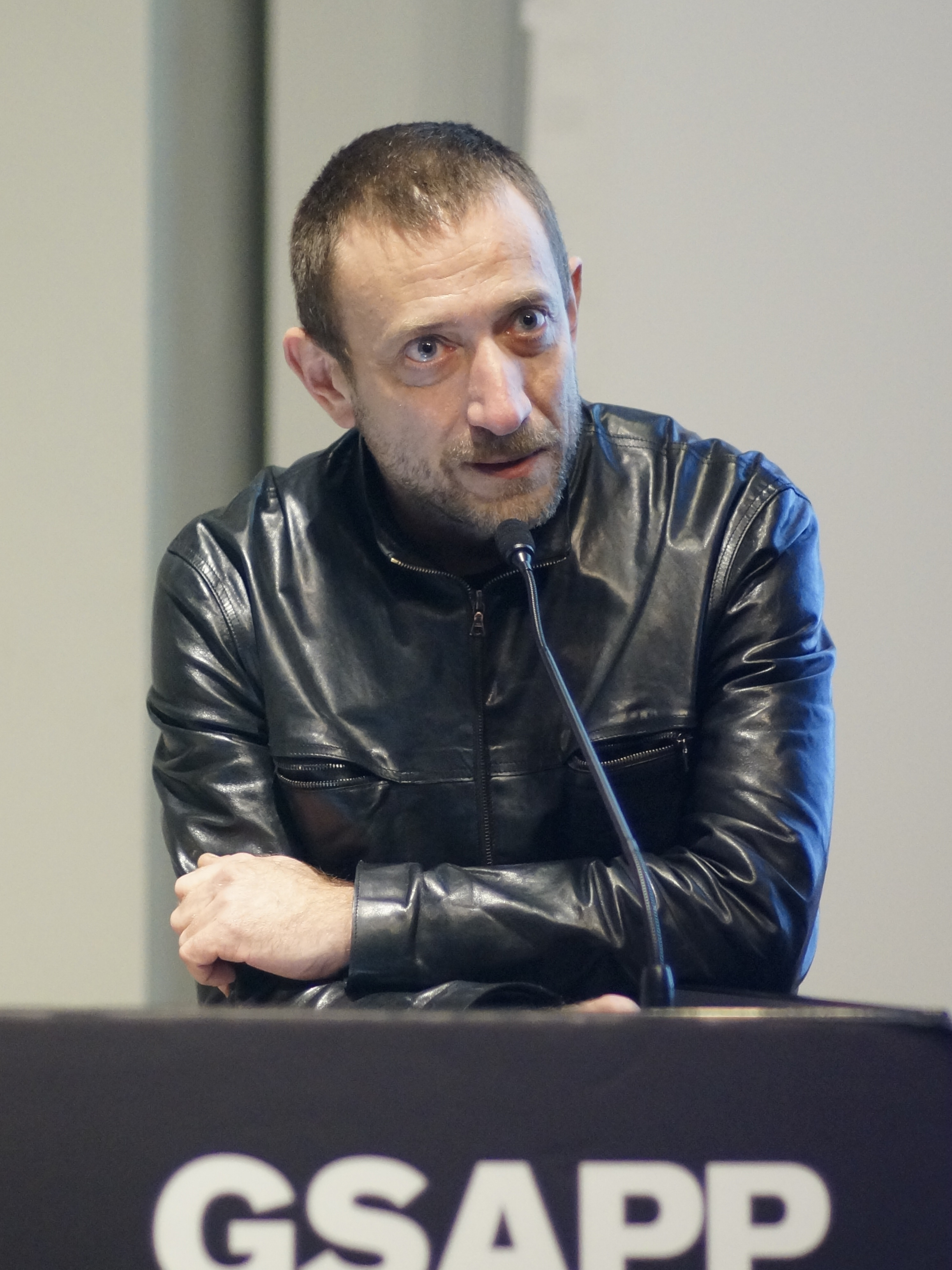
- Born: August 19, 1968 (age 58); Beirut, Lebanon
- Education: Rhode Island School of Design, Harvard University
- Occupation: Architect
- Website: https://www.bernardkhoury.com/

Bernard Khoury (born August 19, 1968, in Beirut, Lebanon) is a Lebanese architect. His work has been extensively published by the professional press. Khoury started an independent practice in 1993. Over the years, his office has developed an international reputation and a significant diverse portfolio of projects both locally and abroad.

== Background ==
Khoury was born on August 19, 1968, in Beirut, Lebanon. His father, Khalil Khoury, was a Lebanese architect and designer who worked with exposed concrete, designing projects such as the Mont La Salle School Campus, the Municipal Stadium of Jounieh and the Interdesign Showroom building. Khoury’s father produced work at differing scales ranging from the design and production of furniture items to his participation in the development of the master plan for the reconstruction of the Beirut Central District in 1977.

Bernard Khoury lived in and out of Lebanon during the early years of the Civil War where he scarcely made it through secondary school, before pursuing his architectural studies in the United States of America, where he received his Bachelor of Fine Arts in 1990 and Bachelor of Architecture in 1991 from the Rhode Island School of Design (RISD), followed by a Masters in Architectural Studies in 1993 from Harvard University.

== Career ==
Khoury started his professional career soon after his graduate studies in post-war Beirut, which became his territory of experimentation where he produced 16 unbuilt projects spanning a period of four years (1993–1997). During the early years of his practice, he was financially supported by his family's furniture manufacturing business that provided him with a design studio and gave him access to the workshop and manufacturing facilities of their factories.

Khoury first came to public and critical attention with the completion of the B018 music club in 1998, his first built project. This building sparked a string of temporary projects, through which Khoury built a reputation for his ability to produce critical interventions in problematic zones. These include his first six built projects: the BO18 Music Club (Built 1998), the Centrale project (Built 2000), Yabani R2 (Built 2002), the BLC Bank (Built 2004), the Bank of Beirut pavilion in Chtaura (Built 2004), as well as the Black Box (Built 2005). In the media, various publications dubbed Khoury "the bad boy" of architecture in the Middle East.

Khoury's early clients came primarily from the entertainment industry. He then produced projects for local banks and real estate developers which implied permanent interventions and larger scale projects. During the booming period of post war years, he built a number of highly visible structures in Beirut. These according to Khoury were the product of very complex, problematic socio political conditions. Khoury’s first permanent building IB3, was completed in 2006, triggering a series of residential projects; these include plot #732 (Built 2008), plot #183 (Built 2009), plot #893 (Built 2010), plots #2251 & 1314 (Built 2013) in which Khoury designed his own residence. These were followed by the developments on plot #4371 (Built 2015), plot #1282 (Built 2017), and plot #1063 R2 (Built 2019). Plots #1342 & 1343 R4 (Built 2014), plot #1072 (Built 2014) and plot #450 (Built 2020) are high rise residential developments designed to make a forceful imprint on the cacophony that is the Beirut skyline.

To this date Khoury also built six projects in the mountainous regions of Lebanon, including but not limited to plot # 7950 (Built 2010), a technological marvel housing 52 engines that operate its retractable roof, and plot # 4328 (Built 2010) with its accessible inclined façade culminating in a linear lap pool.

He also developed the architectural identities and built an important number of commercial branches for Banque Libano Francaise (between 1999/2006), Bank of Beirut (between 2006/2019), and Banque Libanaise pour le Commerce (between 2004/2005).

Writing in Metropolis in 2007, Stephen Zacks identified a tension in Khoury’s work between exposing Beirut’s social inequalities and creating exclusive leisure and residential spaces for affluent clients. In the same article, architect Makram el Kadi praised the connection between Khoury’s early projects and their Lebanese context, but questioned how effectively his critical approach could extend to other countries.

His first international commission, the Pfefferberg Project located in Berlin, Germany (1999 / 2001), consisted of the conversion of an industrial block into a cultural quarter. Aborted commissions followed in Europe, including the Santa Cesarea project in Italy (2007), as well as residential projects in England, Spain and Serbia. More recently, Khoury has been commissioned projects in various territories. These include a number of interventions for the Tumo Center for Creative Technologies in Yerevan (Built 2011), Vagarshapat (Proposal 2016), Koghb (Under Construction 2017), Paris (Built 2018), Masis (Proposal 2018), Gyumri (Built, 2020), Beirut (In Progress 2021) and Los Angeles (In Progress 2023). In addition to the Tumo Park (2011) and the Epygi Park Master Plan (2013) in Yerevan, and the AGBU NKR Campus (2013) in Nagorno-Karabakh, Armenia.

Other projects on the international front include: the Babyn Yar Memorial (On Hold 2021) in Kyiv, and Vyzvolennia Square & Dasu Building (Proposal 2020) in Mariupol, Ukraine; Corniche de Dakar (Under Construction 2022) in Dakar, Senegal; Miami Hand Center (Proposal 2018) in Miami and the Urban Confluence Silicon Valley R1 (Proposal 2020) in San Jose, US; and Coziness Valley (Proposal 2020) in Murmansk, Russia.

Khoury has worked on numerous large-scale projects in the Arab world. These comprise the Saray Mixed Use Development in Casablanca R2 (Under Construction 2020) in Casablanca, Morocco as well as a number of schemes in the Arabian Gulf region, such as the Fintas Market (2003), the Andalus Development (2006), the VVIP Terminal (2007), the Kuwait Free Trade Zone Park (Built 2013) and Al Ghanim Industries (2021) in Kuwait; the Alargan Business Bay Development (2006), the Ajman Resort (2012), Plot PJTRH00 (2013), Al Zorah Resort (2014) and Plot ELV01 (Under Construction 2019) in the United Arab Emirates; Al Khayran Oberoi Resort (2005), Al Ghubra Residential Complex (2006), and Al Qurm Mixed Use Development (Built 2012) in Oman; Surramanraa (2005) and Al Khozama (2008) in Saudi Arabia; the Mixed Development Project in Seef District (2009), the Suspended Gardens of Manama (2011) and the Suspended Gardens of Reef Island (2022) in Bahrain; the Long Way Hub (2009) in Libya; Sultana (2010) in Egypt; the 7 Club (Built 2010) in Qatar; .

== Academic ==
Khoury has taught at the American University of Beirut (1994/1995/2003/2010), École Polytechnique Fédérale de Lausanne (2008), l’École Spéciale d’Architecture in Paris (2011/2012), the Second University of Naples (2016), Otis College of Art and Design (2016), Istanbul Bilgi University (2016), and the University of Miami (2022). He is co-founder of the Arab Center for Architecture.

== Experimental ==
- 2021 – Stitching the Skyline [Seoul Biennale of Architecture and Urbanism] Seoul, Korea
- 2013 – C’était un Rendez-vous [commissioned for group show at Centro Cultural Del Mexico Contemporaneo] Mexico City, Mexico
- 2012 – I Wish I Could Make Them All Look Like You [commissioned for the House of Today "Confessions" 2012 Biennale] Beirut, Lebanon
- 2010 – Derailing Beirut [commissioned for "Spazzio" opening show of the MAXXI Museum] Rome, Italy
- 2009 – Catherine Wants to Know [commissioned for solo show at the Beirut Art Center] Beirut, Lebanon
- 2008 – P.O.W 08 [commissioned for "YOU Prison" group show at Sandretto Foundation] Torino, Italy
- 2006 – SS / DW [commissioned for "Moving Homes" group show at Sfeir-Semler Gallery] Beirut, Lebanon
- 1991 – Evolving Scars [Harvard University] Cambridge, U.S.A.

== Awards ==
- 2008 – CNBC Award
- 2004 – Architecture + Award
- 2001 – Borromini Prize honorable mention [awarded by the municipality of Rome, Special Mention for Architects Under 40 Years of Age
